= List of sausages =

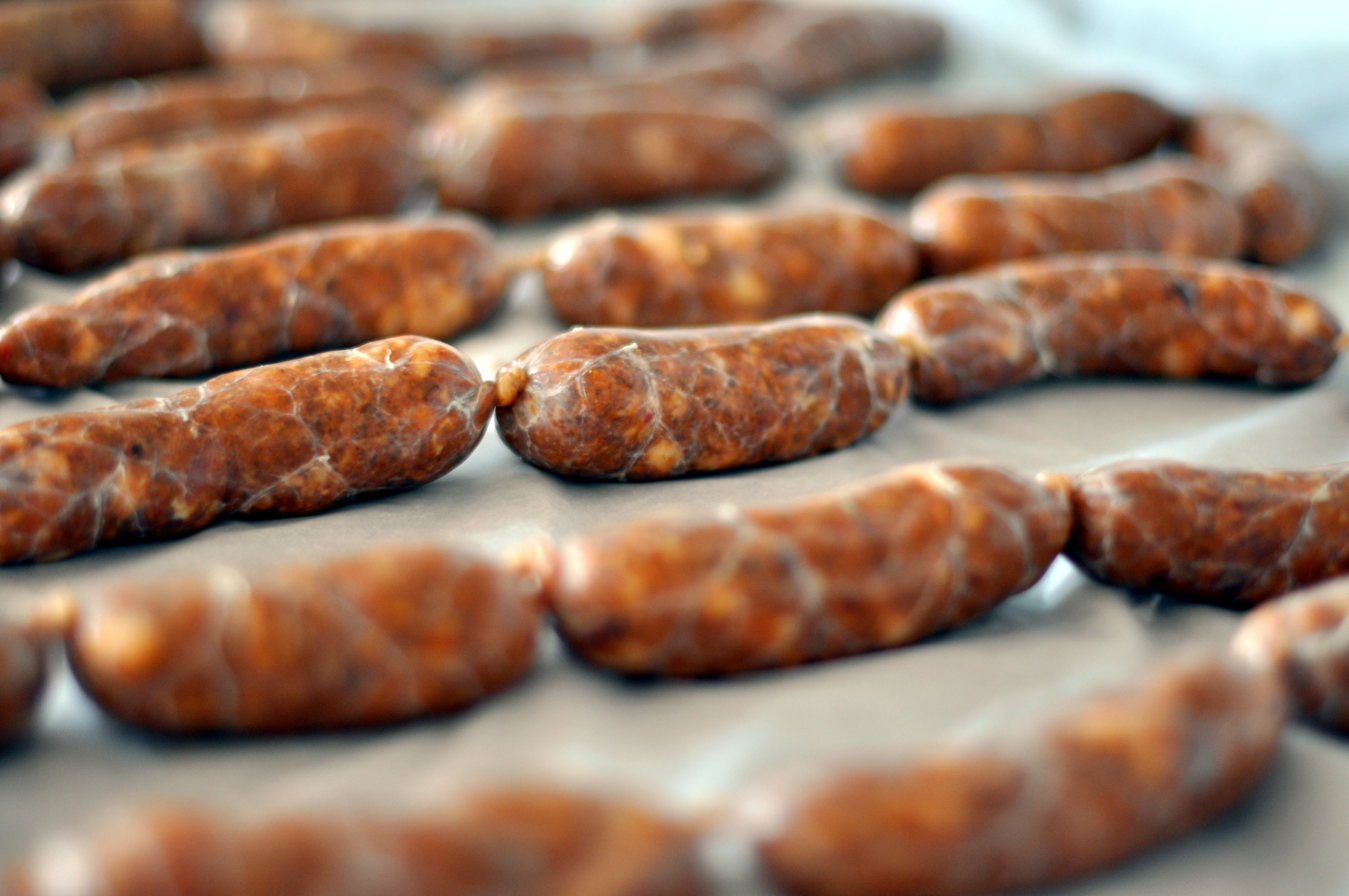
Chorizo sausage

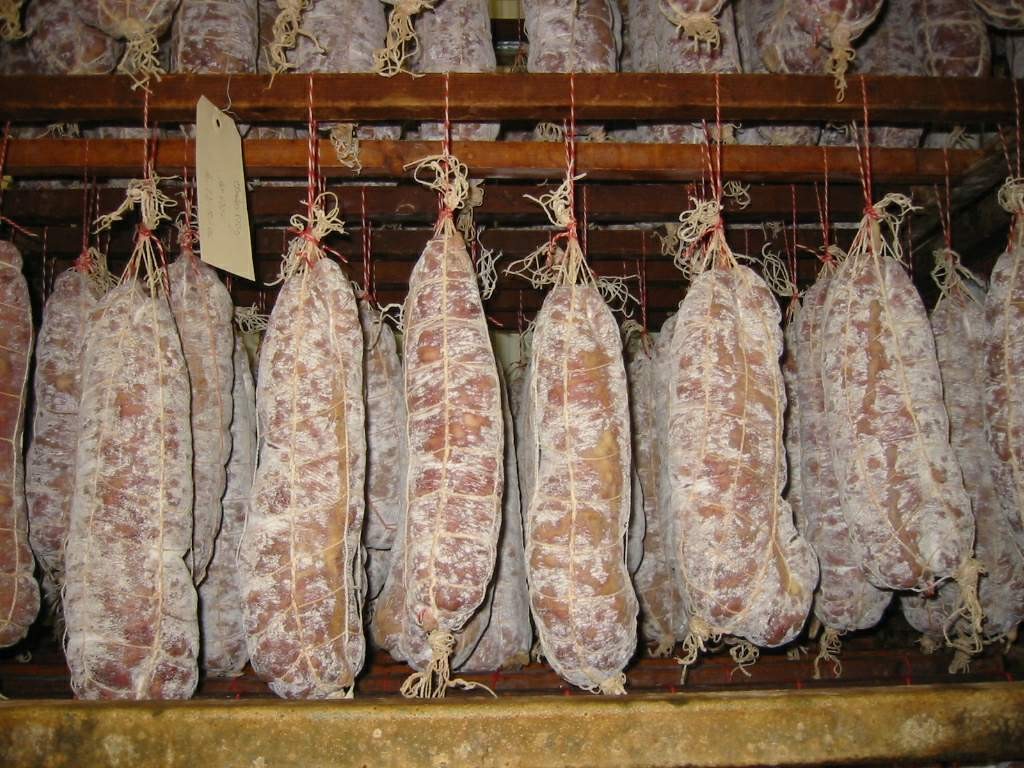
Saucisson

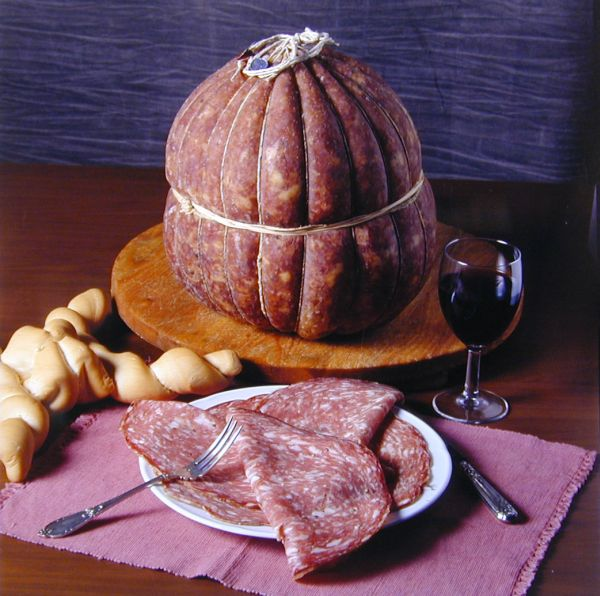
Skilandis

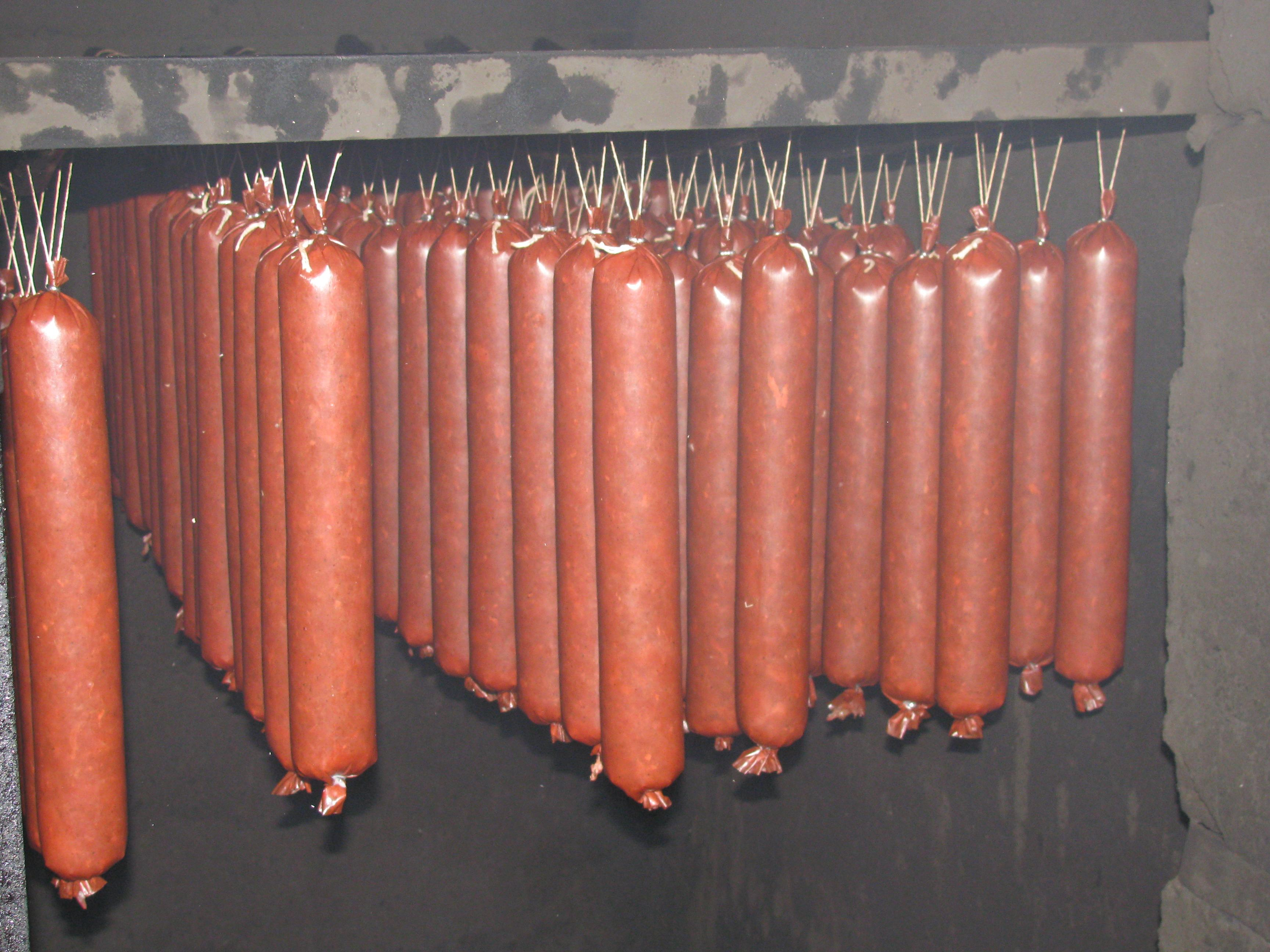
Sausages being smoked

Sausage is a food usually made from ground meat with a skin around it. Typically, a sausage is formed in a casing traditionally made from intestine, but sometimes synthetic. Some sausages are cooked during processing and the casing may be removed after. Sausage making is a traditional food preservation technique. Sausages may be preserved.

== By type ==
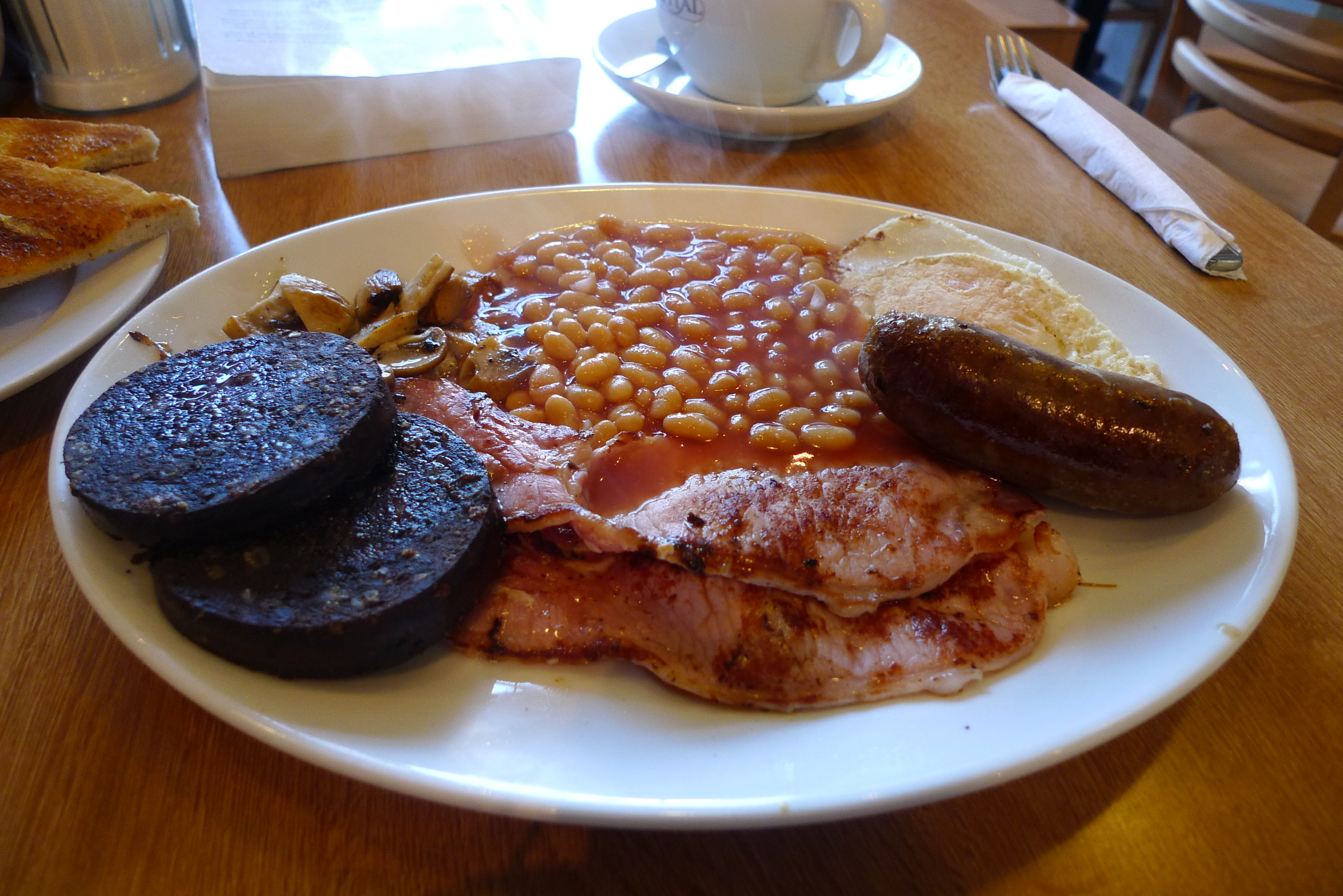
A British-style breakfast with black pudding (far left)

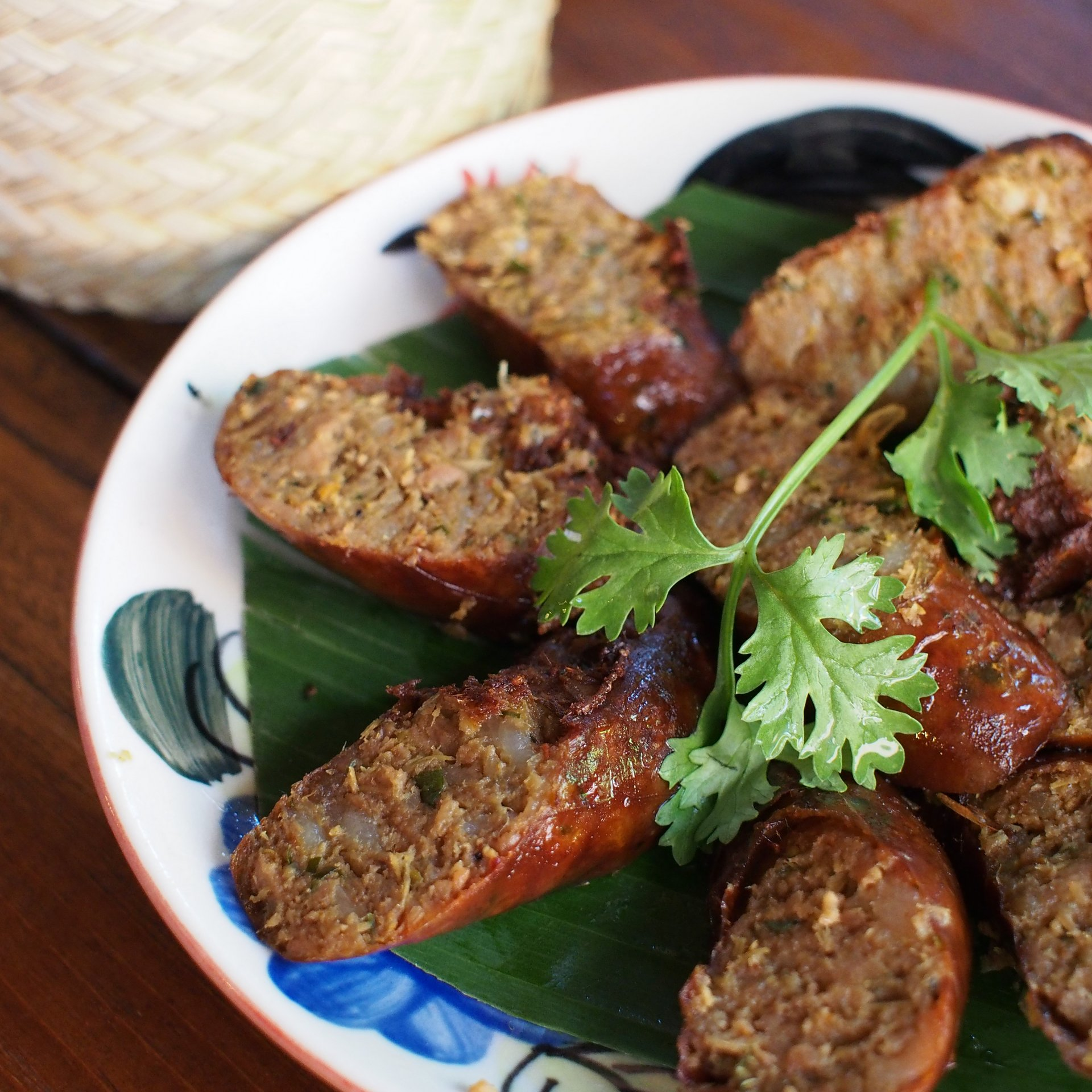
Sai ua is a grilled pork sausage from Northern Thailand, Laos and Northeastern Myanmar.

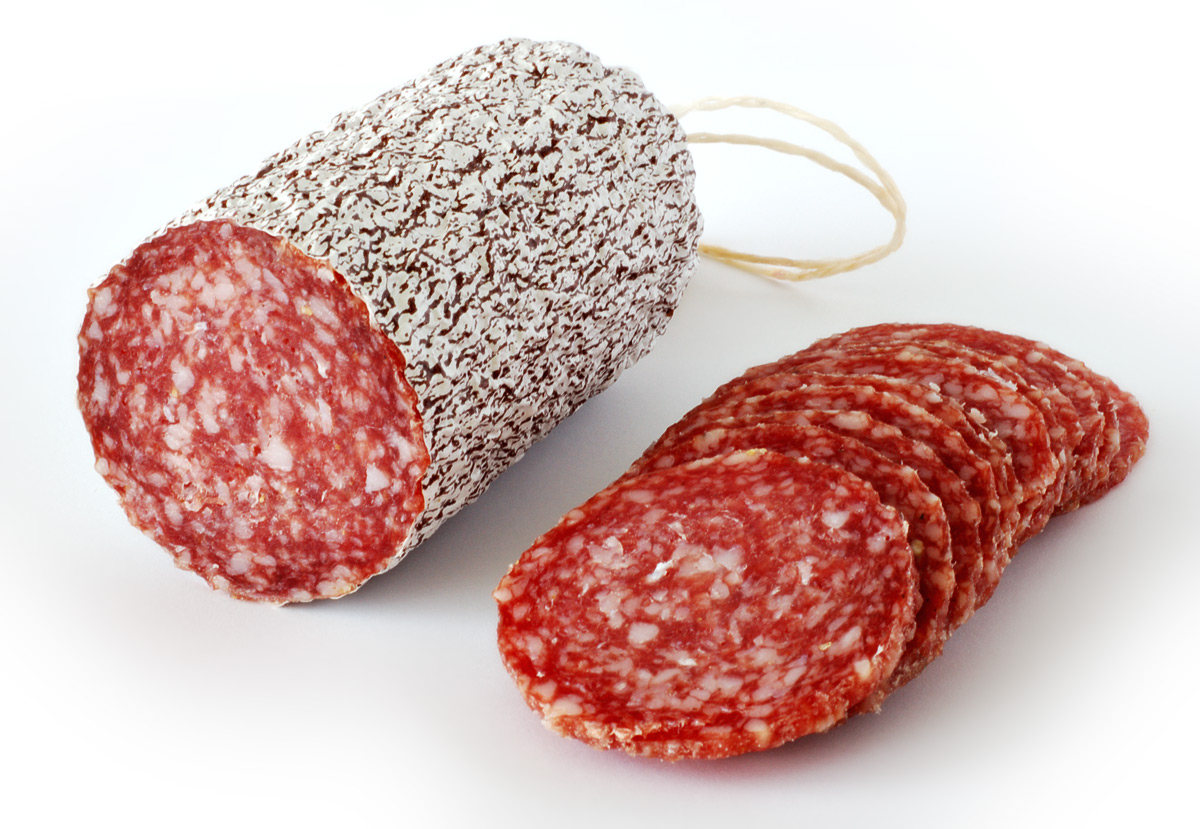
Winter salami is a type of Hungarian salami based on a centuries-old manufacturing tradition.

- Blood sausage – Traditional sausage dish
- Boerewors – Sausage originating from South Africa
- Chorizo – a Spanish pork sausage
- Cocktail sausage – a small sausage able to be served on a cocktail stick as a snack.
- Fermented sausage – a type of sausage that is created by salting chopped or minced meat to remove moisture, while allowing beneficial bacteria to break down sugars into savoury molecules
- Garlic sausage – pork-, beef- or veal-based sausage with fresh, dried or granulated garlic
- Gyurma – Tibetan blood sausage
- Helzel – Ashkenazi Jewish dish
- Hot dog – Sausage in a bun
- Kielbasa – Smoked Polish sausage
- Kranjska klobasa – Slovenian sausage
- Loukaniko – Type of Greek sausage
- Lucanica – Ancient Roman pork sausage
- Merguez – a red, spicy lamb- or beef-based fresh sausage in Maghrebi cuisine
- Panchuker – Deep-fried, corn-battered hot dog on a stick
- Sai ua – Seasoned pork sausage in Laos, Myanmar, and Thailand
- Sai krok Isan – Thai fermented sausage
- Summer sausage – Sausages that can be kept without refrigeration
- Sheftalia – Cypriot sausage
- Träipen – Luxembourgish blood sausage
- Vegetarian sausage – may be made from tofu, seitan, nuts, pulses, mycoprotein, soya protein, vegetables or any combination of similar ingredients that will hold together during cooking
- Volkswagen currywurst – a brand of sausage manufactured by the Volkswagen car maker since 1973
- White pudding – Meat and grain dish
- Winter salami – Type of Hungarian salami
- Zalzett tal-Malti – fresh Maltese pork sausage with sea salt and cracked coriander seeds and black pepper

== By country ==
Notes:

- Many sausages do not have a unique name. E.g. "salsicha", "country sausage", etc.
- Sausages with the same name in different countries may be identical, similar, or significantly different. This also applies to names with different spellings in different regions, e.g. lukanka, loukaniko; bloedworst, blutwurst. The chorizo of many South American countries is different from the Spanish chorizo.

=== Algeria ===
- Merguez

=== Argentina ===
- Bondiola
- Chorizo
- Longaniza
- Morcilla

=== Australia ===
- Bunnings sausage/democracy sausage (or snags); see sausage sizzle
- Chipolata
- Devon (also known as 'Polony' or 'Fritz')
- Kanga Bangas
- Saveloy

=== Austria ===
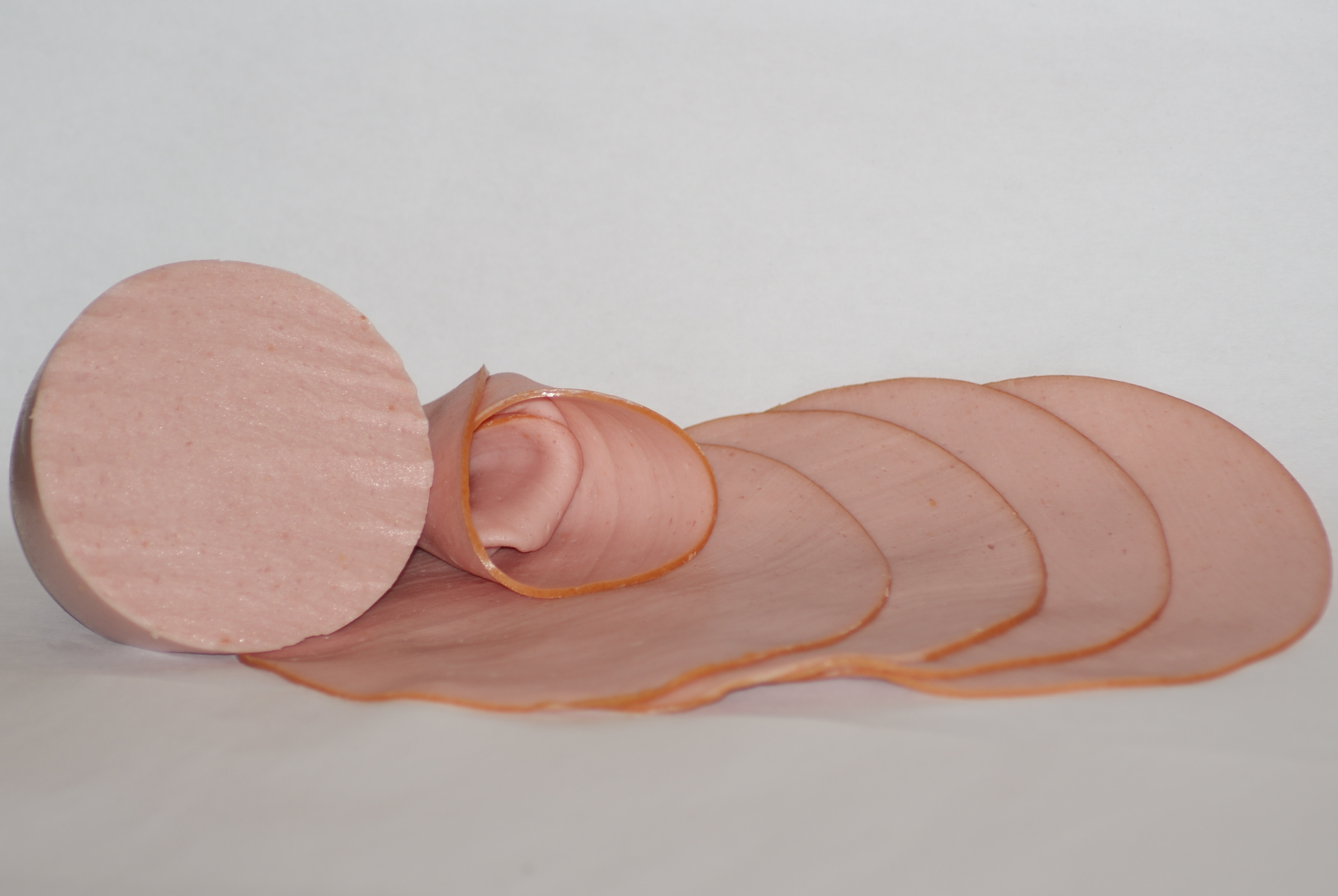
Smoked Extrawurst

- Blunze
- Bratwurst
- Braunschweiger, also called Dürre. Essential part of Potato-Goulash (Kartoffelgulasch).
- Debrecener
- Extrawurst, in variants with pieces of Gherkins (Gurkerlextra) or Paprika (Pikante Extrawurst). A more refined type is called Pariser Wurst or Kalbspariser (with veal). Mostly consumed with the typical Austrian bread roll (Extrawurstsemmel).
- Frankfurter Würstchen; the extra-long variant is called Sacher Würstel.
- Jausenwurst
- Kabanossi
- Käsekrainer
- Knackwurst
- Zungenwurst

=== Belarus ===
- Крывянка or Kaszanka or black pudding

=== Belgium ===
- Bloedworst
- Cervela

=== Bosnia ===
- Ćevapi
- Kobasica
- Sudžuka

=== Brazil ===
- Chouriço doce
- Linguiça
- Linguiça calabresa

=== Brunei ===
- Belutak

=== Bulgaria ===
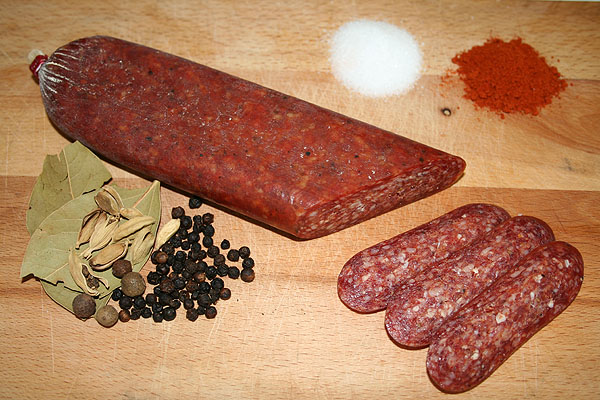
Lukanka

- Lukanka
- Sujuk

=== Cambodia ===
- Tongmo

=== Chile ===
- Chorizo
- Longaniza

=== Colombia ===
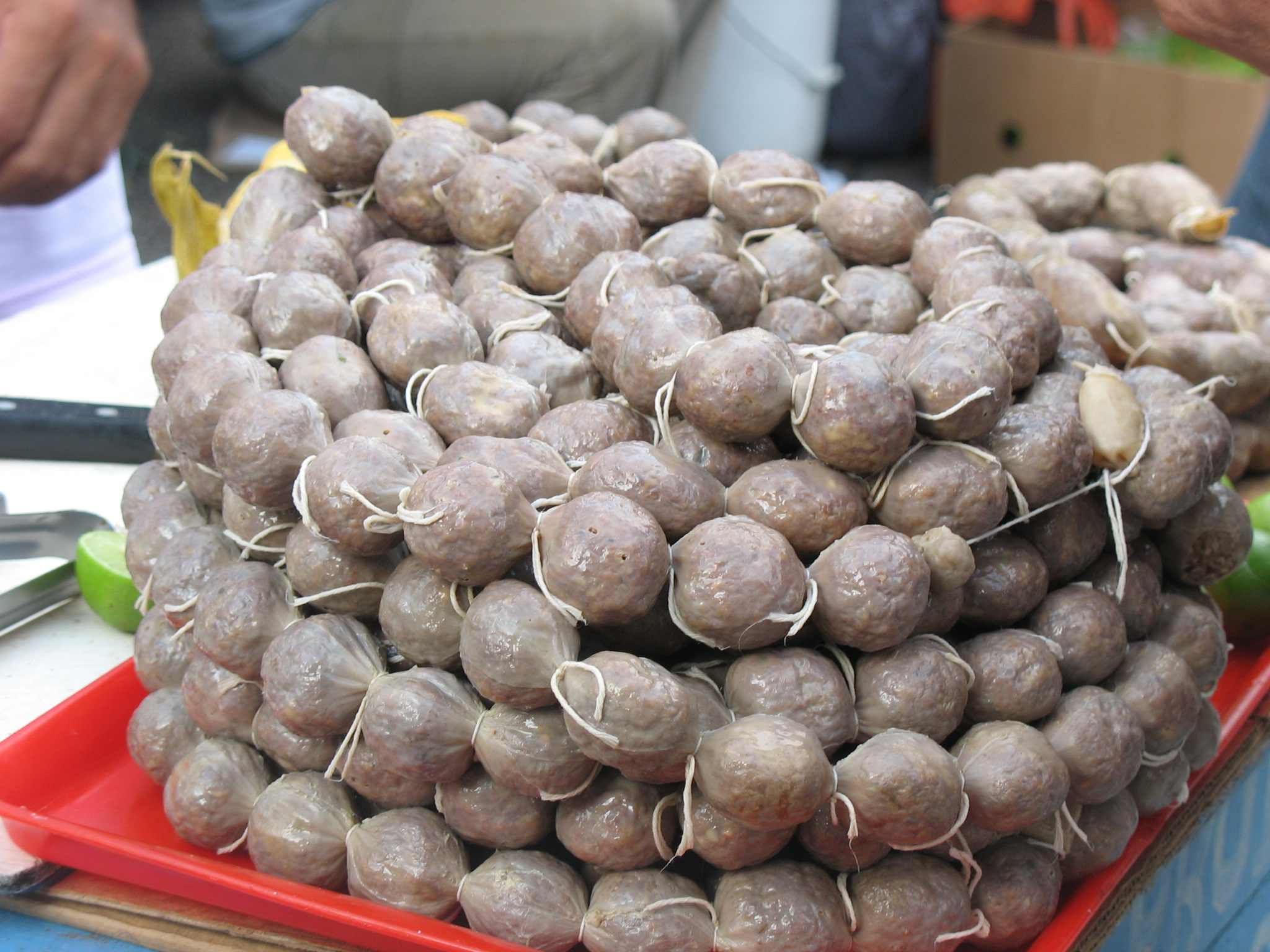
Butifarras Soledeñas: sausages of Soledad, Atlántico, Colombia

- Butifarra Soledeñas

=== Croatia ===
- Češnovka
- Krvavica
- Kulen
- Švargl

=== Cuba ===
- Chorizo
- Moronga

=== Czechia ===
- Jelito
- Jitrnice
- Klobása

=== Denmark ===
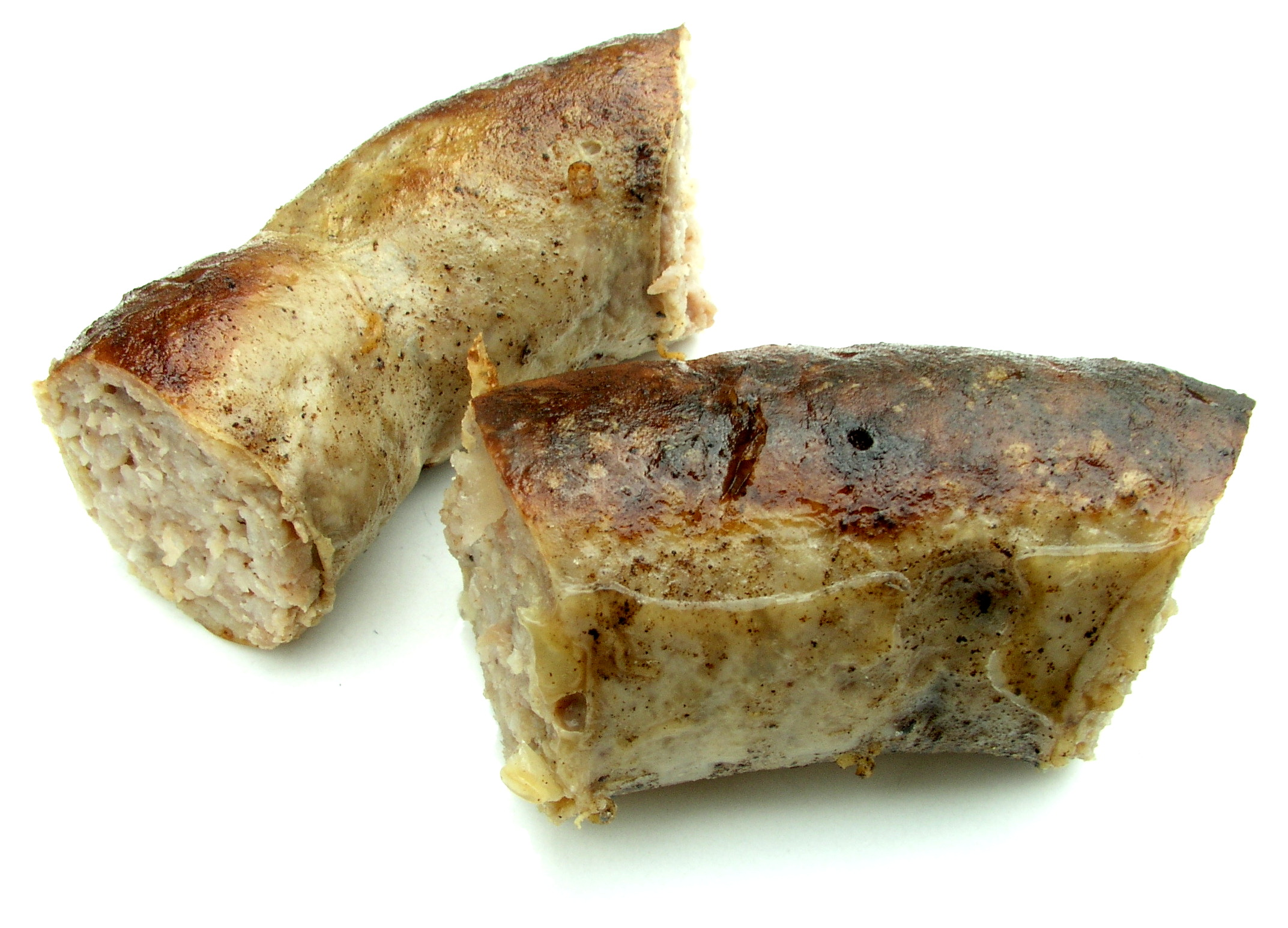
Pieces of fried medisterpølse, of approx. 5 cm

- Blodpølse
- Medisterpølse
- Rød pølse

=== El Salvador ===
- Butifarra
- Chorizo
- Longaniza

=== Estonia ===
- Verivorst
- Valgevorst
- Kartulivorst

=== Finland ===
- Mustamakkara
- Ryynimakkara
- Siskonmakkara

=== France ===
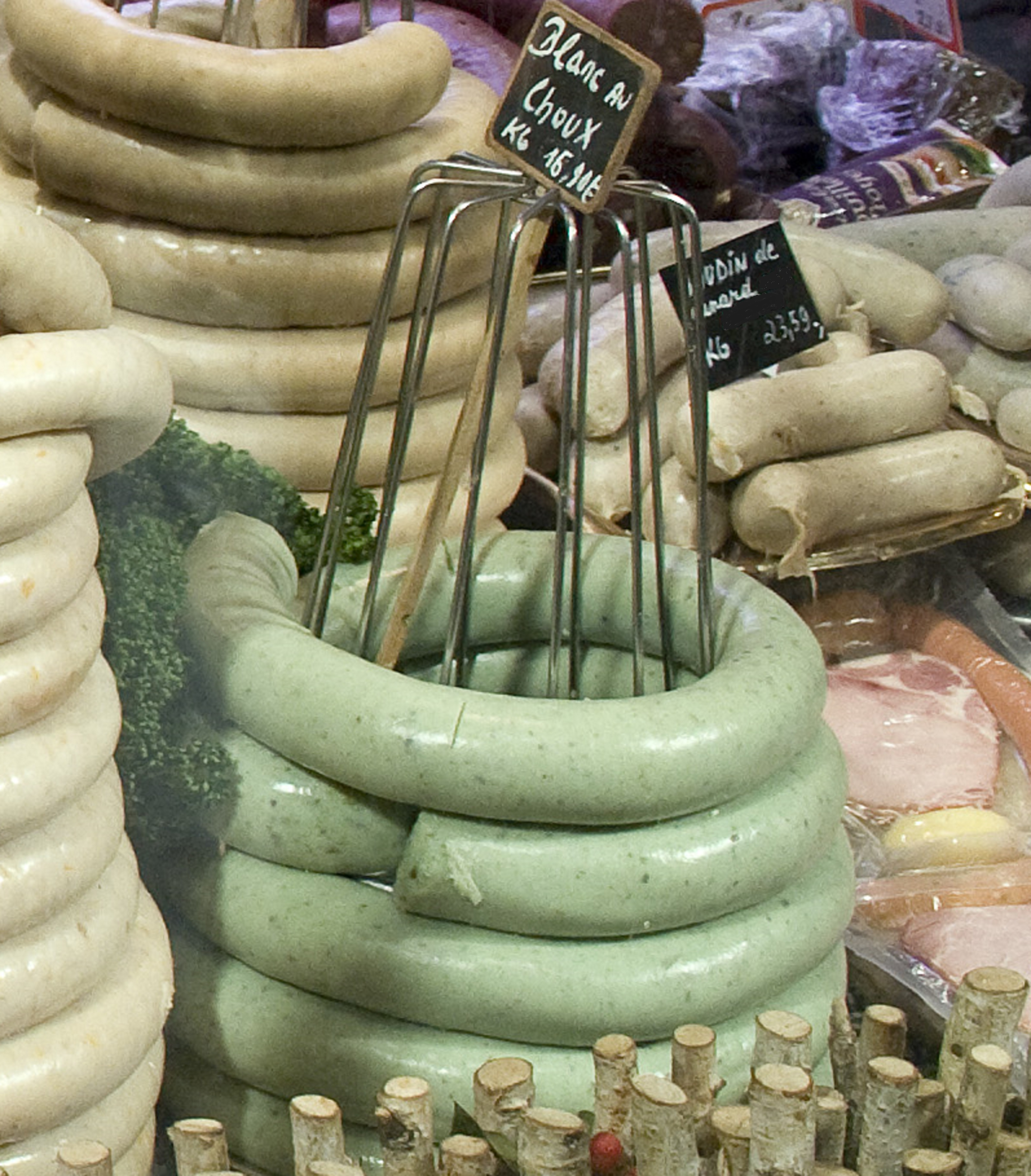
Various boudin

- Andouille – Type of sausage
- Andouillette – Type of sausage
- Boudin – Types of sausage
- Boudin blanc de Rethel – Types of sausage
- Cervelas de Lyon – French sausage
- Chipolata – Type of sausage
- Diot – French pork sausage
- Morteau sausage – Type of French sausage
- Rosette de Lyon – Cured saucisson or French pork sausage
- Sabodet – Pig's head sausage in Lyonnaise cuisine
- Saucisse de Toulouse – French sausage
- Saucisson – Dry-cured sausage
- Saucisson de Lyon – Pork sausage in Lyonnaise cuisine

=== Georgia ===
- Kupati

=== Germany ===
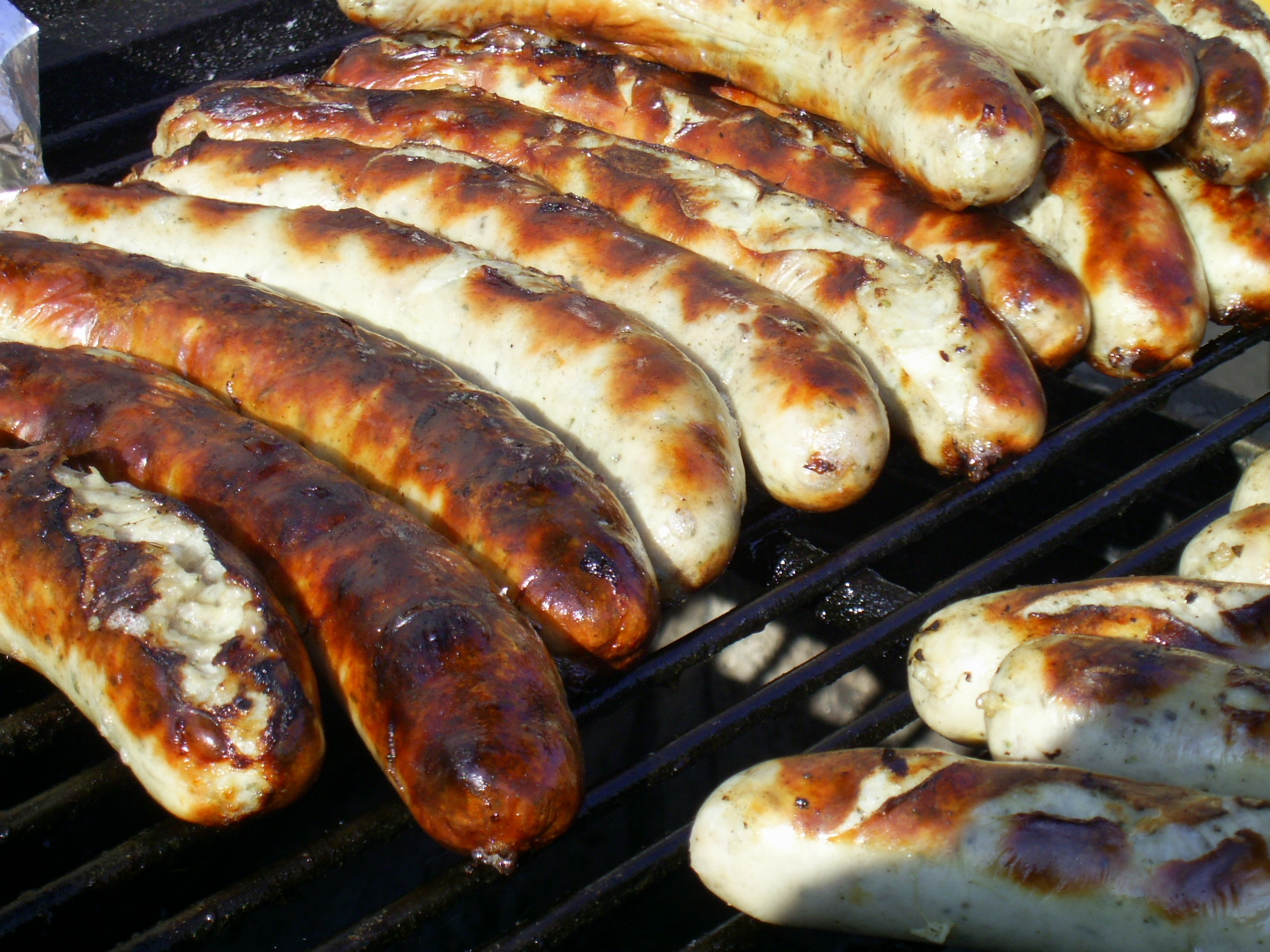
Thuringian sausage

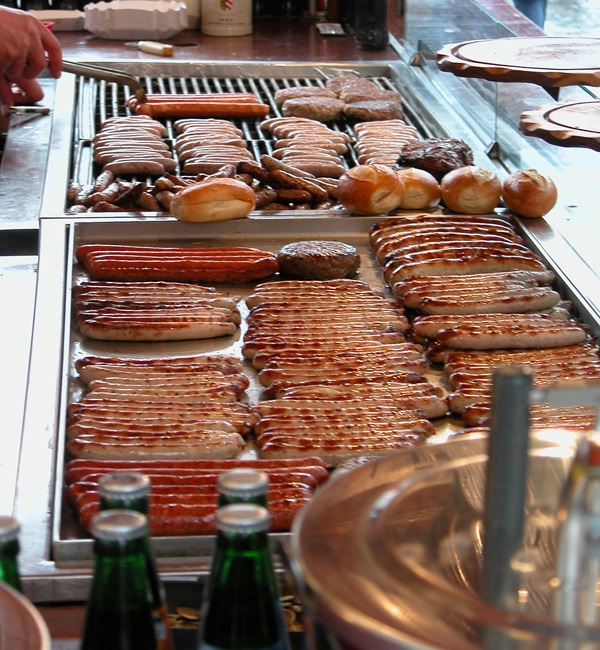
A variety of bratwurst on a stand at the Hauptmarkt in Nuremberg, Germany

- Ahle Wurst – German pork sausage
- Beutelwurst – German blood sausage
- Bierschinken – Type of sausage or cold cut
- Bierwurst – Smoked food
- Blutwurst – Traditional sausage dish
- Bockwurst – German sausage
- Bratwurst – Type of sausage
- Braunschweiger – Sausage named after Braunschweig, Germany
- Bregenwurst – Type of German sausage
- Brühwurst – German classification for sausages
- Frankfurter Rindswurst – German sausage
- Frankfurter Würstchen – Sausage specialty from Frankfurt, Hesse
- Gelbwurst – Traditional sausage from Germany
- Jagdwurst – German sausage
- Knackwurst – Short, plump, Low German sausage type
- Knipp – German meat-and-grain sausage
- Kochwurst – German pre-cooked sausage
- Kohlwurst – German smoked sausage
- Landjäger – Type of semi-dried sausage
- Leberkäse – Baked loaf of finely minced meat with a skin like crust on the outside
- Leberwurst – Type of sausage
- Mettwurst – German pork sausage
- Möpkenbrot – German pork and grain sausage
- Nürnberger Bratwürste – Type of sausage
- Pinkel – Type of German sausage
- Regensburger Wurst – German pork sausage
- Saumagen – German stuffed dish of potatoes and pork with spices
- Schinkenwurst – Type of sausage prepared using ham
- Stippgrütze – German barley and sausage dish
- Teewurst – German pork spread
- Thüringer Rostbratwurst – Type of sausage
- Thüringer Rotwurst – Traditional sausage dish
- Weckewerk – German sausage
- Weisswurst – Traditional Bavarian sausage
- Westfälische Rinderwurst – Type of German sausage
- Wiener Würstchen – Type of sausage
- Wollwurst – German sausage
- Zungenwurst – German head cheese with tongue

=== Greece ===
- Loukaniko
- Noumboulo
- Seftalia – minced meat wrapped in reticulate fat.

=== Hungary ===
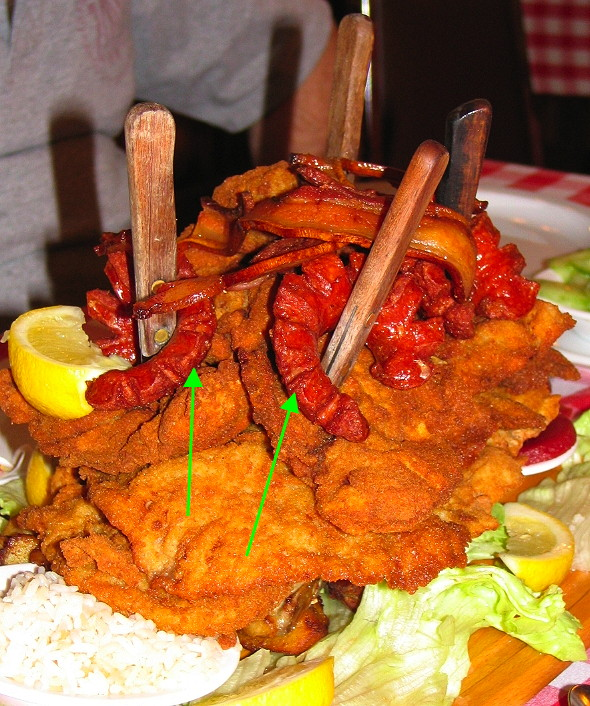
Debrecener (indicated by green arrows) atop a wood platter (festival of meat) at a Hungarian restaurant

- Csabai
- Debrecener
- Gyulai
- Liverwurst
- Pick This may be a brand name, not a style of sausage, see hu:Pick Szeged Zrt.
- Winter salami

=== India ===
- Doh snam
- Goan sausage
- Calcutta sausage

=== Indonesia ===
- Frikandel
- Saren
- Sosis solo
- Urutan – traditional Balinese smoked or air-dried sausage, made from pork stuffed into pig intestines

=== Ireland ===
- Black pudding
- Drisheen
- White pudding

=== Italy ===
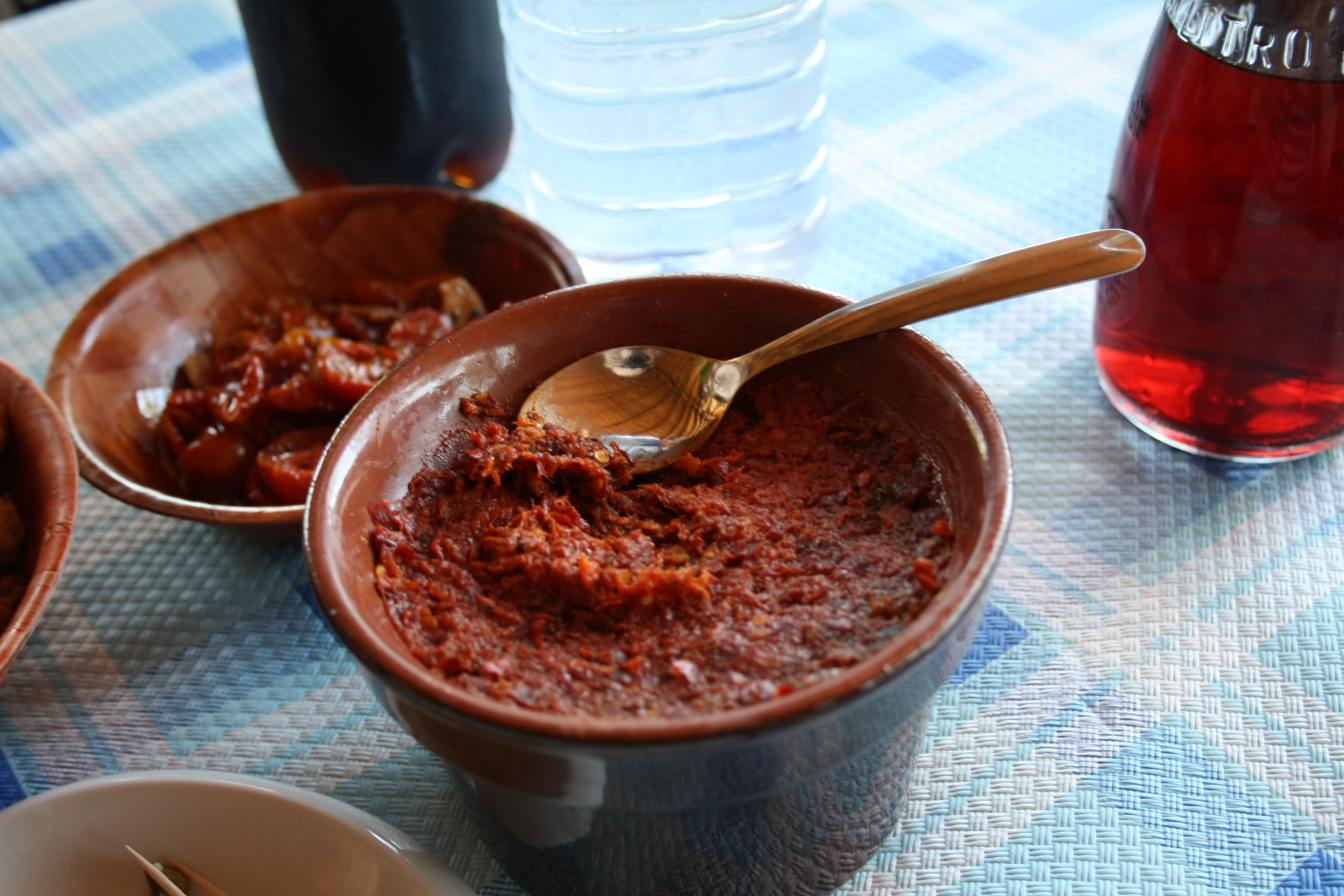
'Nduja is a particularly spicy, spreadable pork sausage from the region of Calabria in Southern Italy.

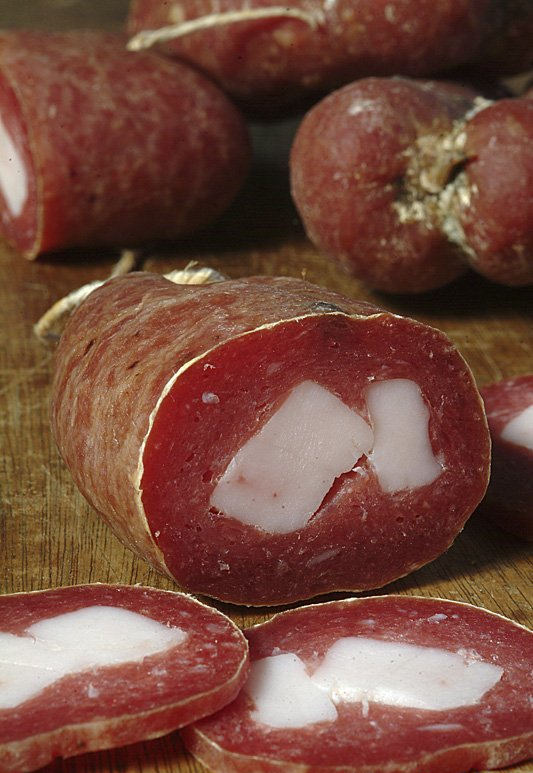
A variety of soppressata

- Biroldo
- Ciauscolo
- Ciavàr
- Cotechino
- Cotechino Modena
- Genoa salami
- Kaminwurz or kaminwurze – air-dried and cold-smoked sausage (Rohwurst) made of beef and fatback or pork, produced in the South Tyrol region of northern Italy. Occasionally, kaminwurz is also made of lamb, goat or venison. The name of the sausage comes from the custom of curing the sausages in a smokehouse attached to the chimney up on the roof truss of Tyrolean houses.
- Likëngë
- Luganega
- Mazzafegati
- Mortadella
- 'Nduja
- Salami
- Soppressata
- Zampina

==== Italian salami ====
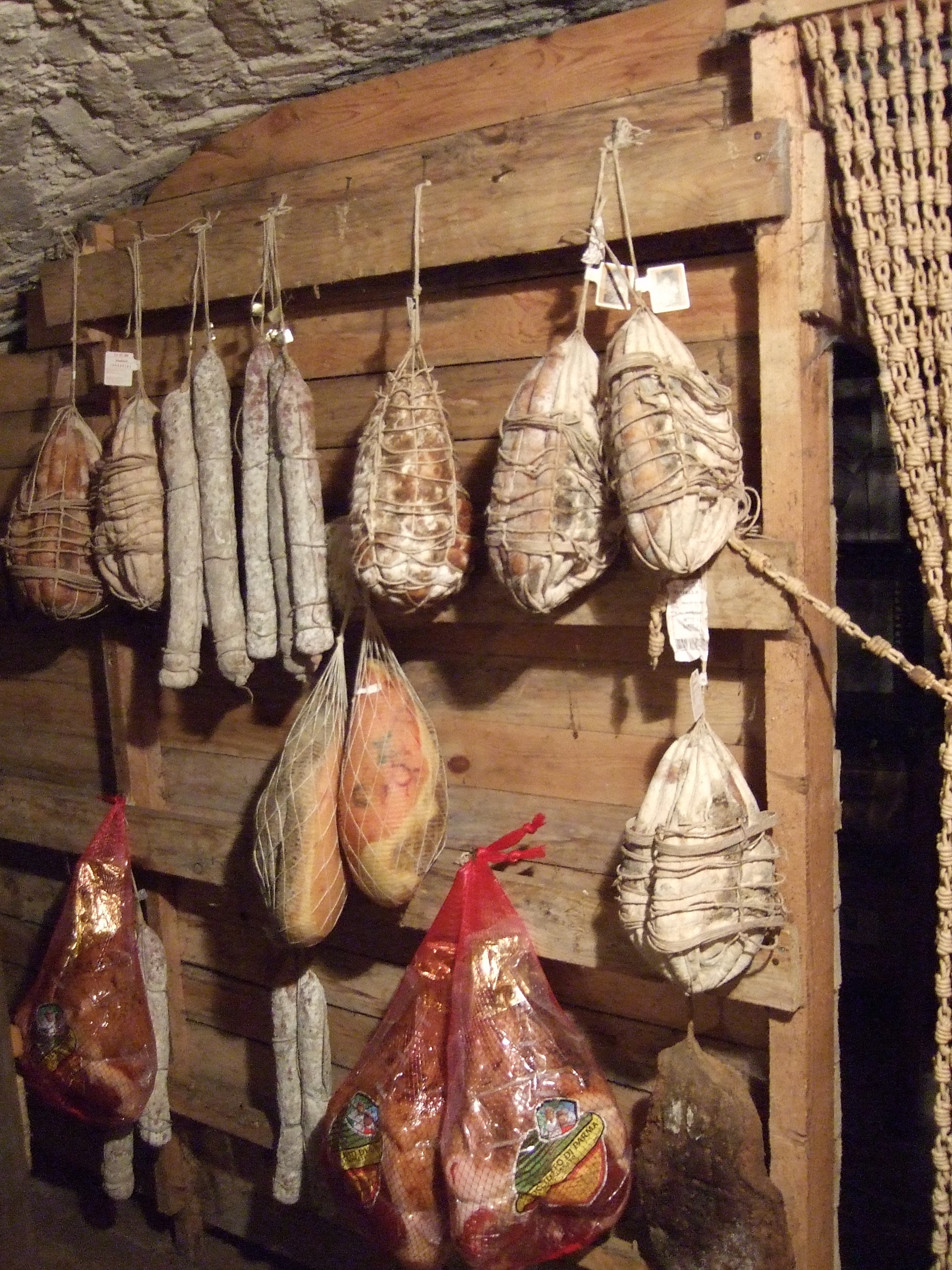
Aging salumi

Salumi are Italian cured meat products and predominantly made from pork. Only sausage versions of salami are listed below. See the salami article and Category:Salumi for additional varieties.

- Ciauscolo – Variety of Italian salame
- Cotechino Modena – Type of Italian sausage
- Genoa salami – American variety of salami
- Mortadella – Large Italian pork sausage
- 'Nduja – Italian spicy, spreadable pork sausage
- Salami – Cured sausage, fermented and air-dried meat
- Soppressata – Italian dry salami (sausage)
- Sopressa – Italian dry salami (sausage)
- Strolghino – Italian cured pork

=== Japan ===
- Fish sausage (ja:魚肉ソーセージ)
- Kurobuta

=== Kazakhstan ===
- Qarta
- Qazy

=== Korea ===
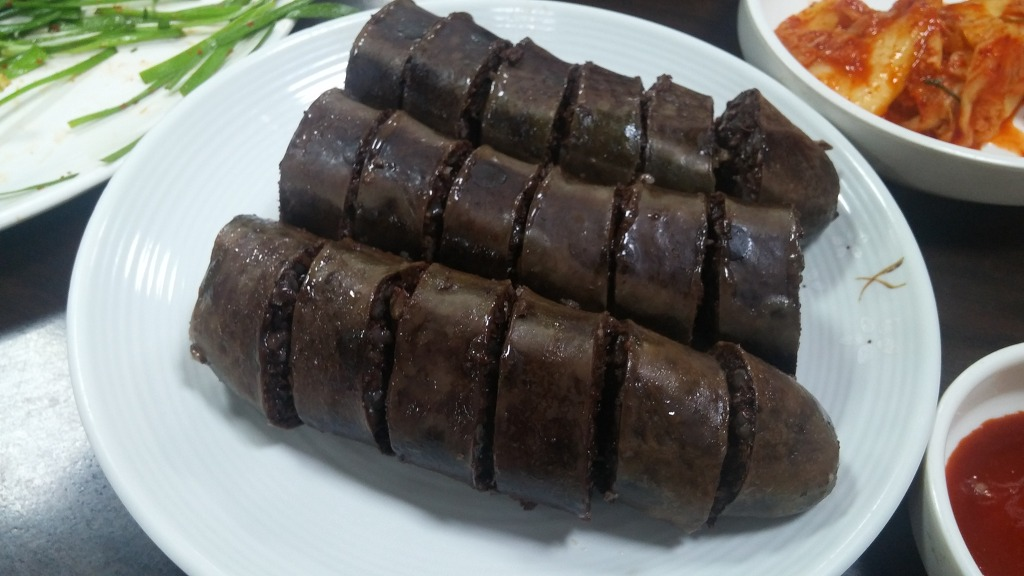
Sundae is a type of blood sausage in Korean cuisine.

- Sundae

=== Laos ===
- Lao sausage
- Sai gork
- Sai oua
- Som moo

=== Lebanon ===
- Makanek, also referred to as na'anik

=== Lithuania ===
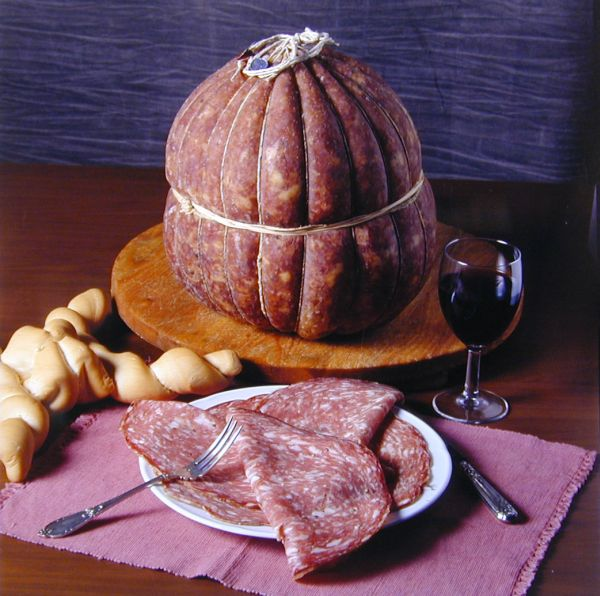
Skilandis

- Skilandis

=== Malaysia ===
- Lekor – fish sausage
- Tongmo – Cham-style spiced beef sausage

=== Mexico ===
- Chorizo
- Moronga

=== Namibia ===
- Boerewors
- Droëwors

=== Netherlands ===
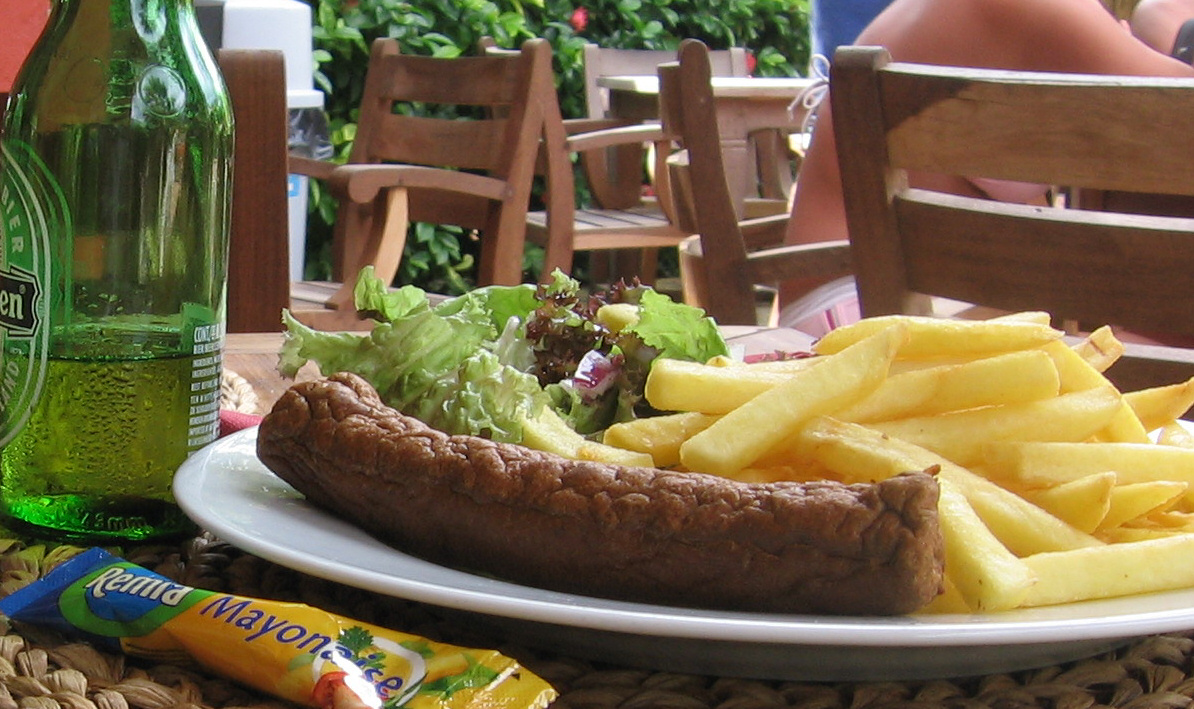
A frikandel with fries, lettuce and mayonnaise

- Balkenbrij – Traditional Dutch food
- Bloedworst – Traditional sausage dish
- Braadworst – Large Dutch sausage composed of pork
- Frikandel – Deep fried meat snack
- Metworst – Type of traditional Dutch sausage
- Ossenworst – Dutch sausage
- Rookworst – Type of Dutch sausage

=== Philippines ===
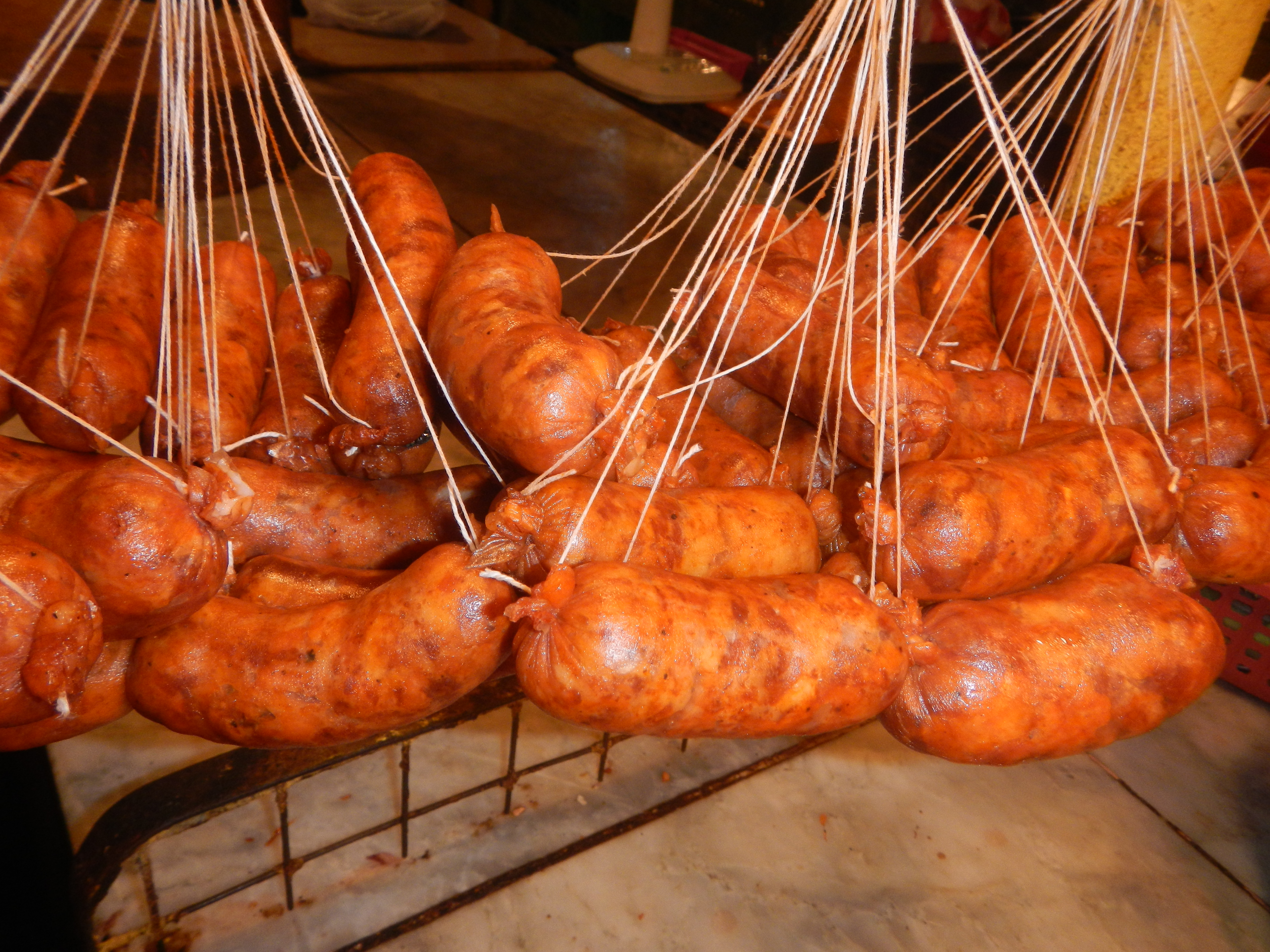
Calumpit longganisa at a market in the Philippines

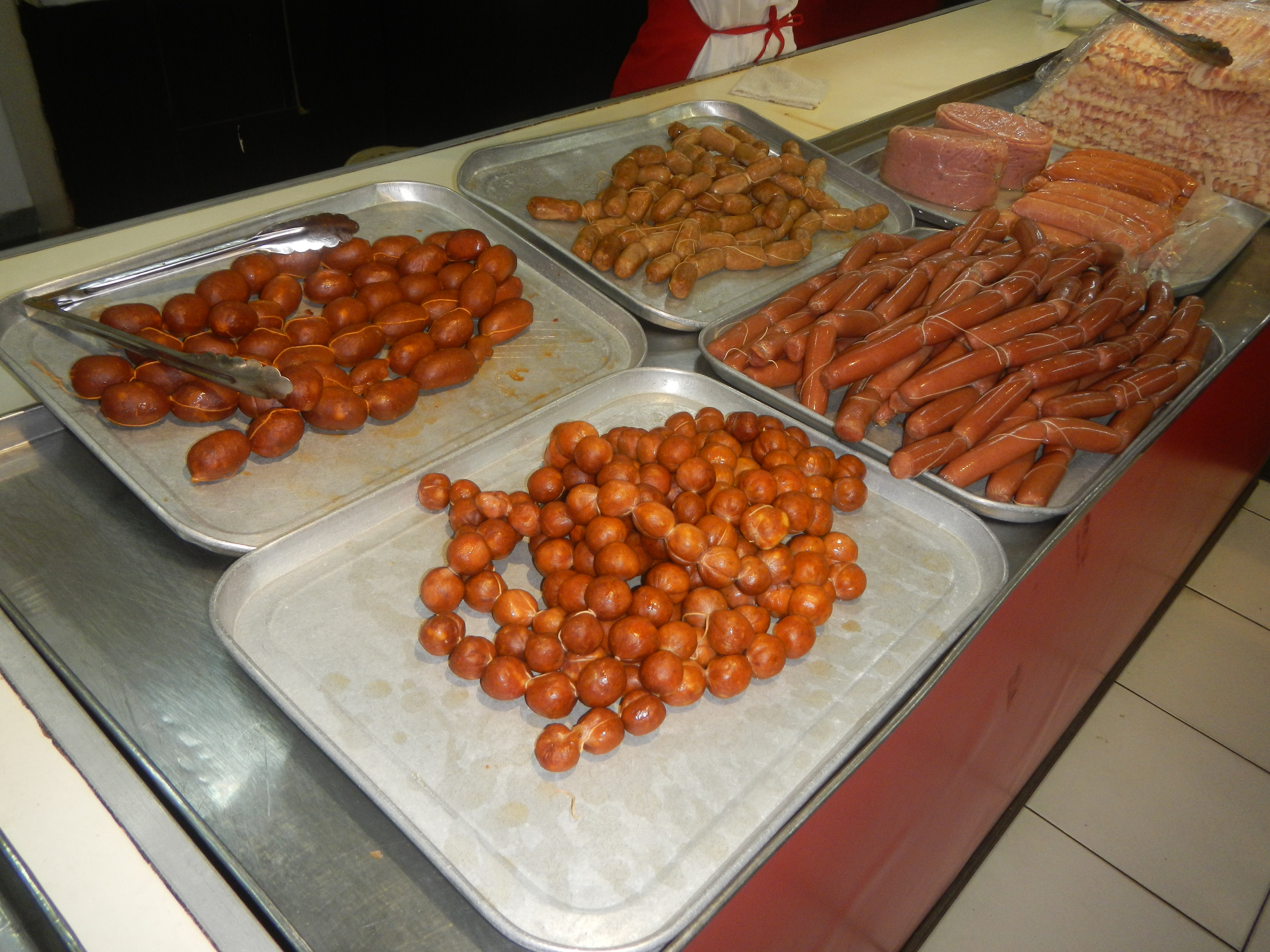
Various types of Philippine longganisa in Quiapo, Manila

- Alaminos longganisa
- Baguio longganisa
- Cabanatuan longganisa
- Calumpit longganisa or Longganisang Bawang
- Chicken longganisa
- Chorizo de Bilbao
- Chorizo de Cebu or Longganisa de Cebu
- Chorizo de Macao
- Chorizo Negrense or Bacolod Longganisa
- Fish longganisa
- Guagua longganisa
- Longaniza de Guinobatan or Guinobatan Longganisa
- Lucban longganisa
- Pampanga longganisa
- Pinuneg'
- Tuguegarao longganisa or Longganisang Ybanag
- Vigan longganisa

=== Poland ===
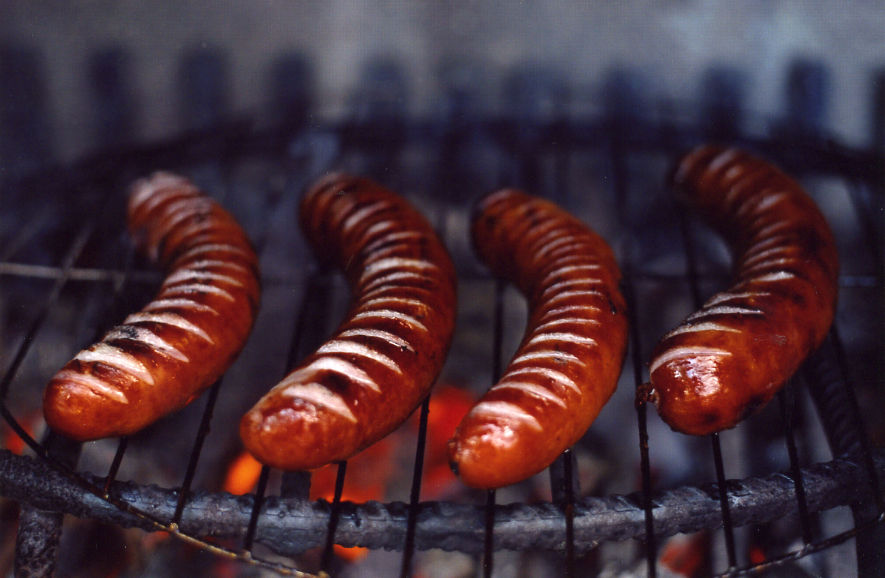
Polish kielbasa, grilled

- Kabanos (Kabanosy staropolskie) – a thin, air-dried sausage flavoured with caraway seed, originally made of pork
- Kaszanka or kiszka – traditional blood sausage or black pudding
- Kielbasa
  - Kiełbasa biała – a white sausage sold uncooked
  - Kiełbasa jałowcowa (staropolska) – juniper sausage
  - Kiełbasa myśliwska (staropolska) – hunter's sausage
  - Kiełbasa wędzona – Polish smoked sausage
- Krakowska (Kiełbasa krakowska sucha staropolska) – a thick, straight sausage hot-smoked with pepper and garlic
- Myśliwska – smoked, dried pork sausage.
- Prasky
- Weselna – "wedding" sausage, medium thick, u-shaped smoked sausage; often eaten during parties, but not exclusively
- Wiejska (Polish pronunciation: [ˈvʲejska]) – a large U-shaped pork and veal sausage with marjoram and garlic

=== Portugal ===
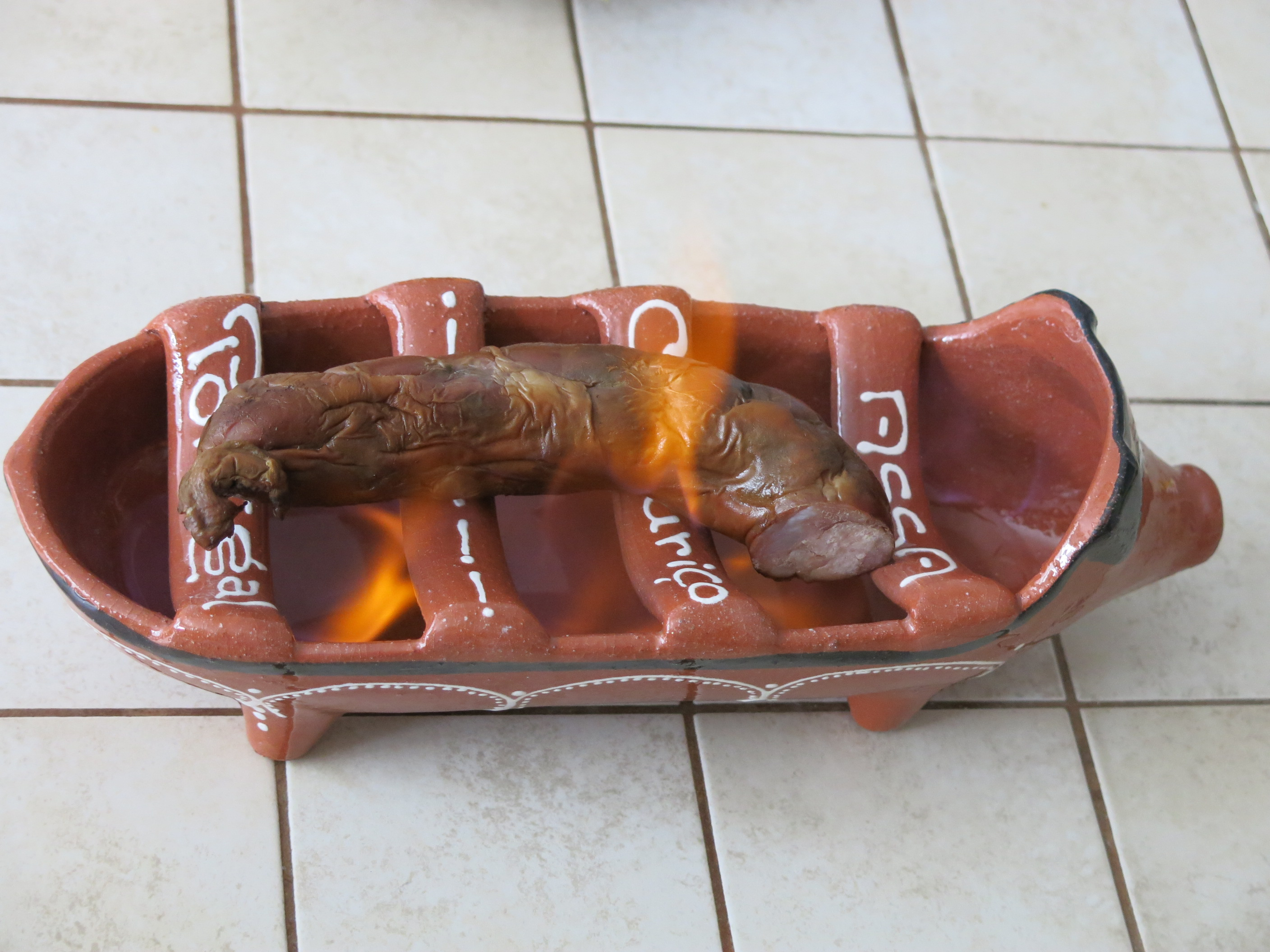
Chorizo Grill Dish

- Alheira – Type of Portuguese sausage from Northern Portugal (commonly associated with Trás-os-Montes)

Cut(s): Mixed meats (commonly pork with poultry and/or game)
Key ingredients: Bread; garlic; spices (often paprika)
Casing: Pork small intestine
Smoked: Typically yes

- Azaruja sausage – Type of sausage from Portugal from Azaruja in Southern Portugal

Cut(s): Pork (specific cuts vary by family/variety)
Key ingredients: Spices; bread (common in several traditional versions)
Casing: Pork intestine
Smoked: Varies by type (some smoked; some cooked/fresh)

- Botelo – Dry-cured pork sausage from northwestern Iberia from Northern Portugal (Trás-os-Montes)

Cut(s): Pork ribs and bones with meat attached; cartilage/trim
Key ingredients: Garlic; paprika; salt; wine; bay leaf (common)
Casing: Pig stomach or cecum (varies)
Smoked: Yes (smoked and dried; typically eaten cooked)

- Chouriça – Similar but thinner than chouriço, from Northern Portugal

Cut(s): Pork (lean and fat)
Key ingredients: Garlic; paprika (colorau); wine (often)
Casing: According to the dictionary it's typically Sheep intestine (thinner casing) but commonly seen using Pork
Smoked: Yes

- Chouriço – Pork sausage originating from the Iberian Peninsula found nationwide (regional styles vary)

Cut(s): Pork (lean and fat)
Key ingredients: Garlic; paprika (colorau); wine (often)
Casing: Pork intestine
Smoked: Yes

- Farinheira – Portuguese smoked sausage from centre inland Portugal (commonly associated with Beira Interior)

Cut(s): Pork fat (sometimes with some meat)
Key ingredients: Wheat flour; paprika; garlic (often wine)
Casing: Pork intestine
Smoked: Typically yes

- Linguiça – Type of Portuguese smoke-cured pork sausage found nationwide (regional styles vary), essential ingredient for Francesinha – Portuguese sandwich

Cut(s): Pork neck, shoulder and belly
Key ingredients: Garlic, white wine, salt and red pepper paste (can be spicy)
Casing: Pork intestine
Smoked: Yes

- Moira – A blood sausage, more heavily spiced and cured longer than the regular Morcela. From Northern Portugal (commonly associated with Trás-os-Montes)

Cut(s): Pork and pork blood
Key ingredients: Pork blood; spices (often more strongly seasoned)
Casing: Pork intestine
Smoked: Typically yes

- Morcela – Traditional sausage dish found nationwide (regional styles vary).

Cut(s): Pork and pork blood
Key ingredients: Often uses rice, onions, and spices like cumin/cloves (for context black pudding typically uses oatmeal or barley for a firmer texture)
Casing: Pork intestine
Smoked: Often yes (varies)

- Paio – Traditional embutido Iberian sausage from Southern Portugal (commonly associated with Alentejo)

Cut(s): Pork loin (lean)
Key ingredients: Garlic; paprika; wine (often)
Casing: Pork stomach fat
Smoked: Typically yes

- Salpicão – Premium, ready-to-eat sausage made from high-quality pork loin, bigger than chouriço. From Northern Portugal (commonly associated with Trás-os-Montes)

Cut(s): Pork loin/tenderloin (often in larger pieces)
Key ingredients: Garlic; paprika; wine; bay leaf (common)
Casing: Pork intestine
Smoked: Typically yes

=== Puerto Rico ===
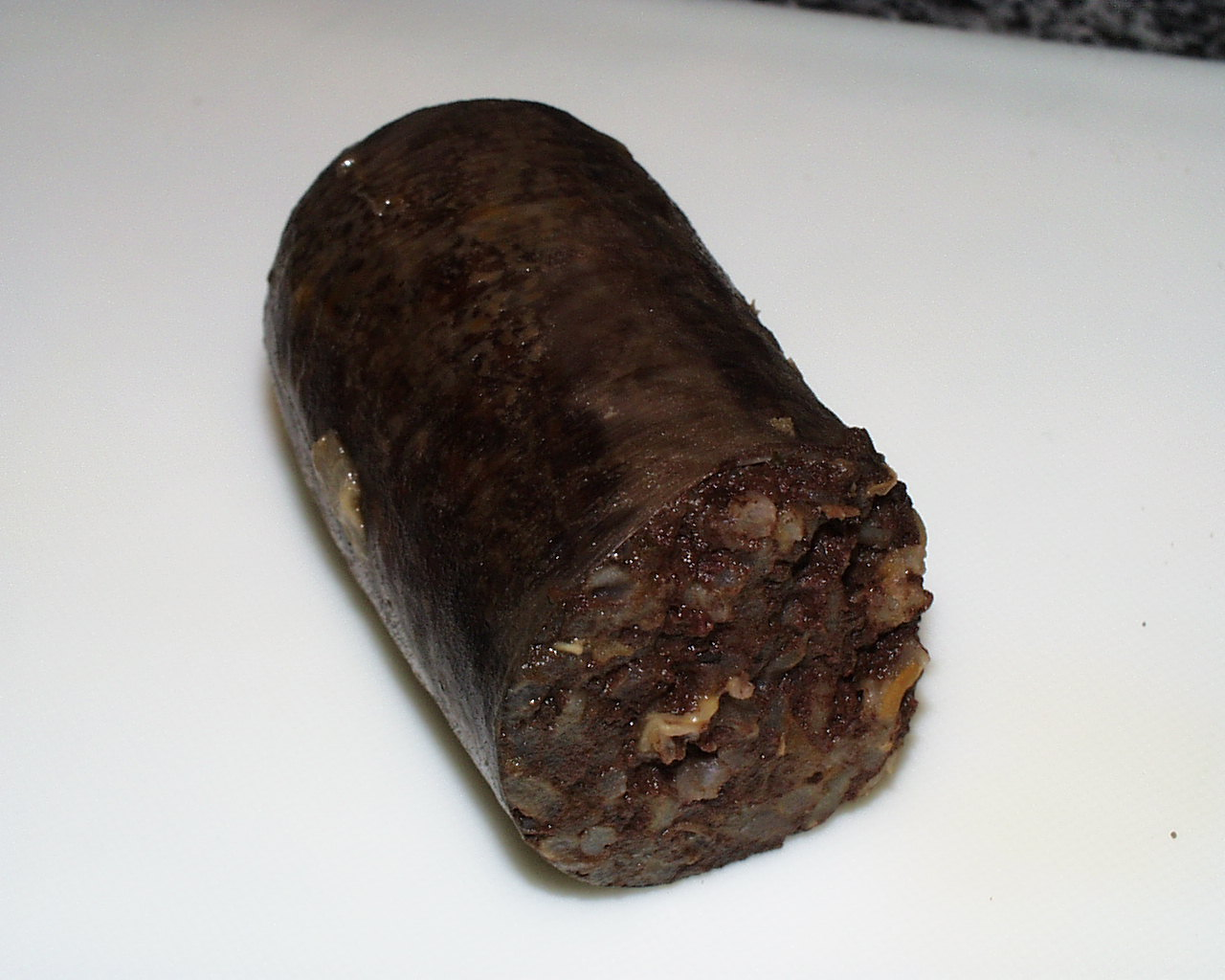
Morcilla cocida, Spanish-style blood sausage eaten in Spain and Latin America

- Butifarra
- Chorizo
- Longaniza
- Morcilla
- Mortadella
- Salchichón

=== Romania ===
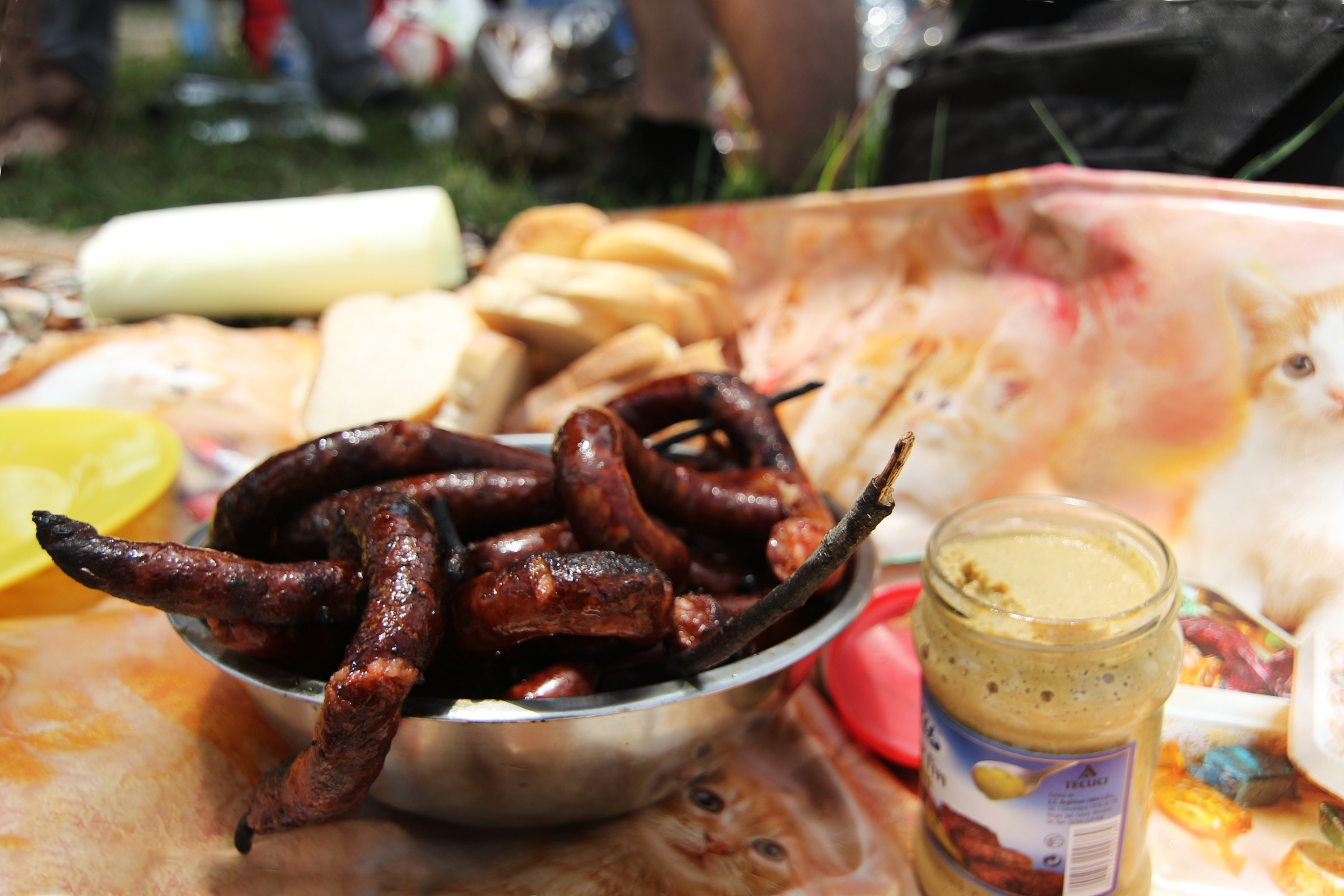
Pleşcoi sausages served with bread and mustard

- Babic
- Banat sausage
- Nădlac sausage
- Pleşcoi sausage
- Sibiu sausage
- Tobă

=== Russia ===
- Doktorskaya kolbasa
- Khaan (ru:Хаан (блюдо)) – a pre-Islamic blood sausage of Turkic peoples, nowadays made only by the Sakha people, as blood sausages are prohibited in Islam.
- Lyubitelskaya (ru:Любительская)
- Makhan (sausage) (ru:Махан (колбаса)) – a Tatar's sausage similar to Qazylyq and Sujuk
- Shyrtan/Sharttan (Chuvash: Шӑрттан, ru:Ширтан) – a ball-shaped Chuvash's sausage made from stomach, similar to Sujuk and Haggis
- Stolichnaya Sausage
- Tultyrma (Bashkir: Тултырма, ru:Тултырма) – a Bashkir's sausage made from heart, liver, and lungs

=== Serbia ===
- Kulen
- Sremska kobasica
- Пеглана кобасица

=== Slovenia ===
- Kranjska klobasa

=== South Africa ===
- Boerewors
- Droëwors

=== Spain ===
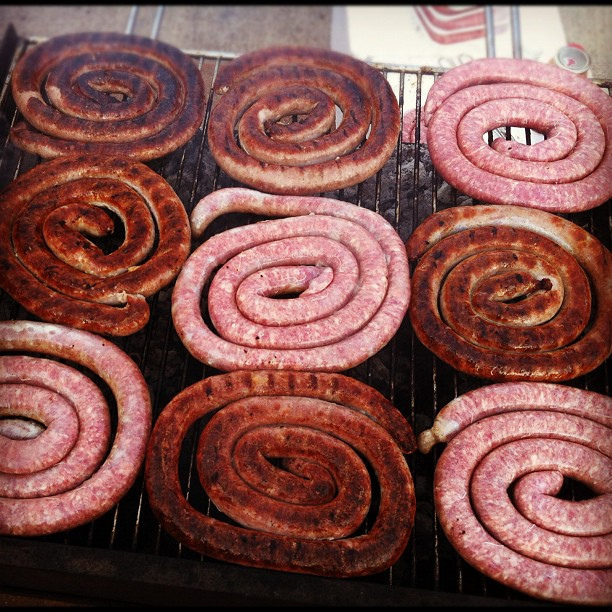
Botifarra cooking on a grill

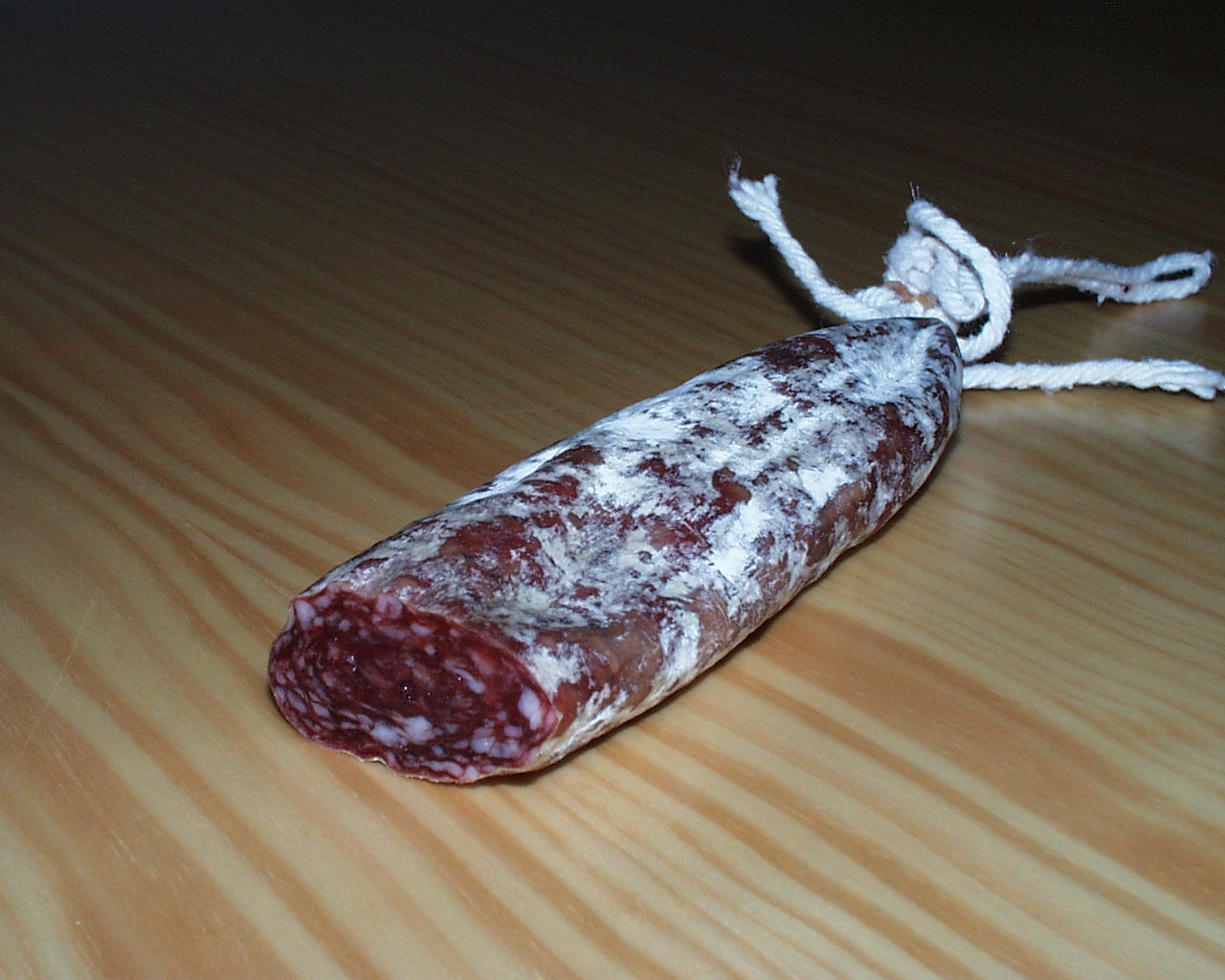
Longaniza

- Androlla
- Botillo – Dry-cured pork sausage from northwestern Iberia
- Butifarra – Catalan sausage dish
- Chistorra – Type of sausage from Spain
- Chorizo – Pork sausage originating from the Iberian Peninsula
- Chorizo de Pamplona – Type of Spanish sausage
- Embutido – Sausage
- Fuet – Catalan dry-cured pork sausage
- Longaniza – Type of sausage originating from Spain
- Morcilla – Traditional sausage dish
- Morcón – Spanish pork sausage
- Salchicha – Meat product
- Salchichón – Spanish summer sausage
- Sobrasada – Raw, cured sausage in Balearic Islands cuisine

=== Sweden ===
- Falukorv
- Fläskkorv
- Isterband
- Pilsnerkorv
- Potatiskorv
- Prinskorv

=== Switzerland ===
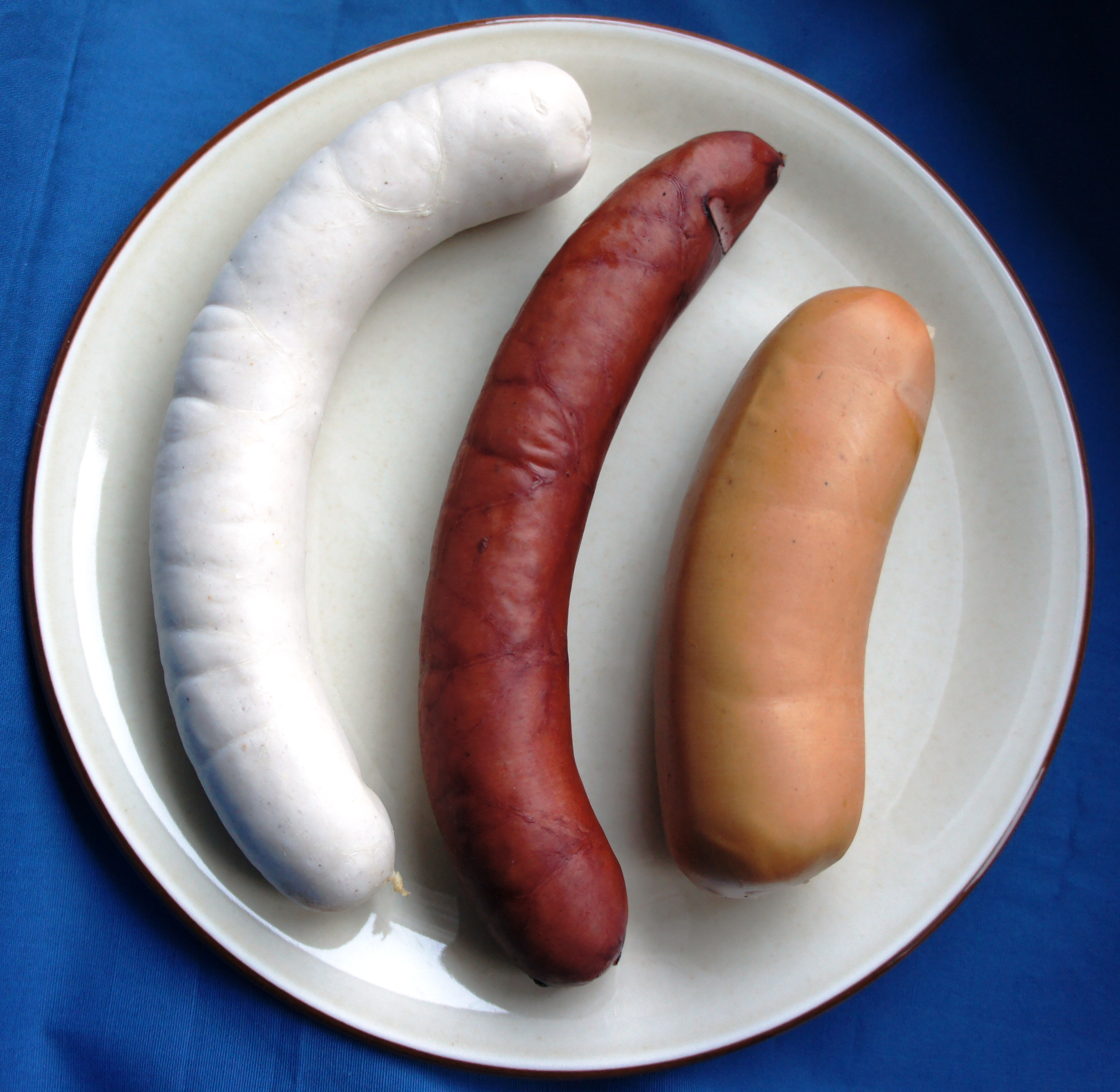
A St. Galler bratwurst, schüblig and cervelat, cooked and served hot

- Cervelat
- Landjäger
- Salame ticinese
- Salsiz
- Saucisse de choux
- Saucisson Vaudois
- Schüblig
- St. Galler Bratwurst

=== Taiwan ===
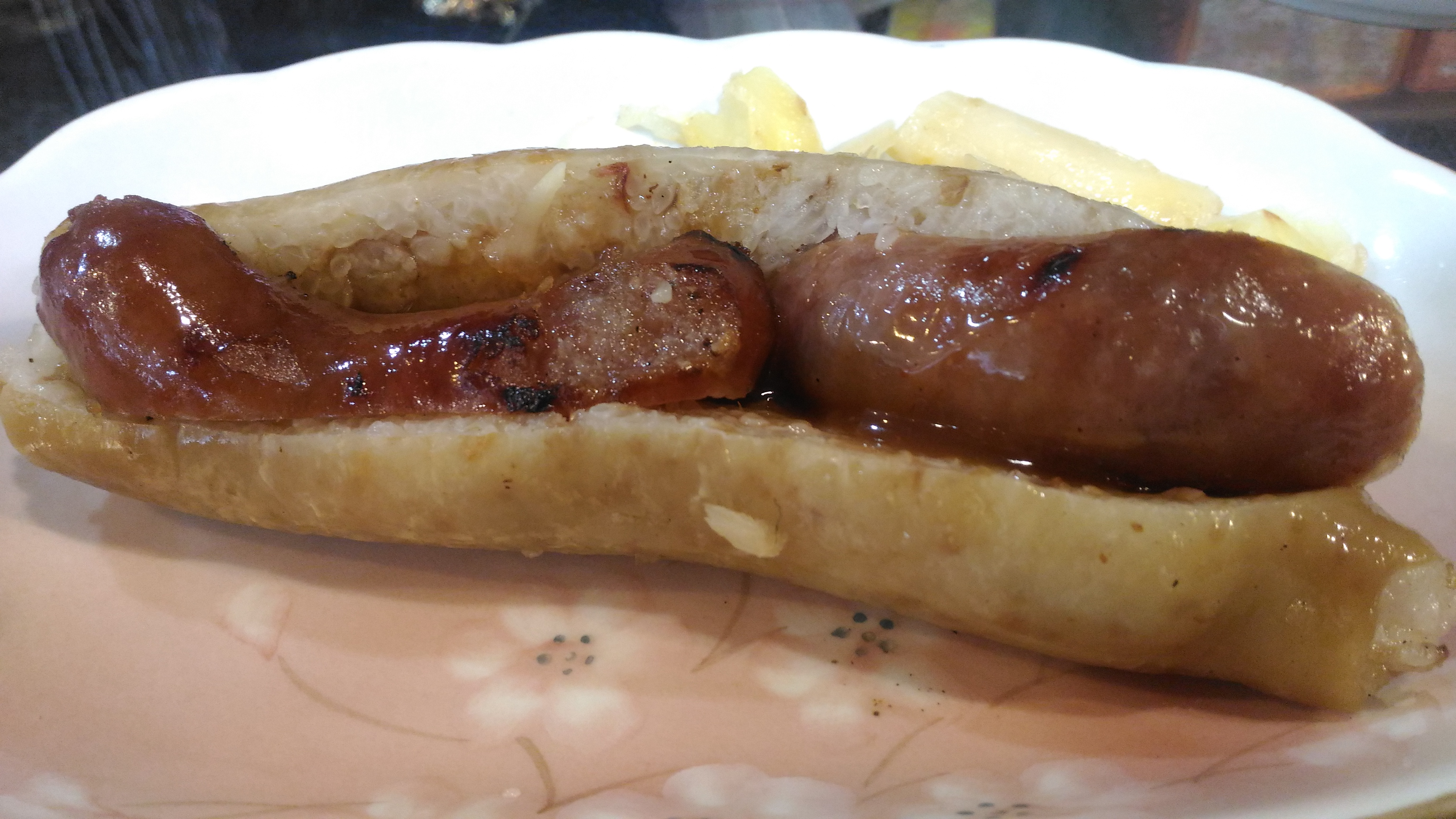
Taiwanese small sausage in large sausage

- Small sausage in large sausage – segment of Taiwanese pork sausage wrapped in a (slightly bigger and fatter) sticky rice sausage, usually served chargrilled

=== Thailand ===
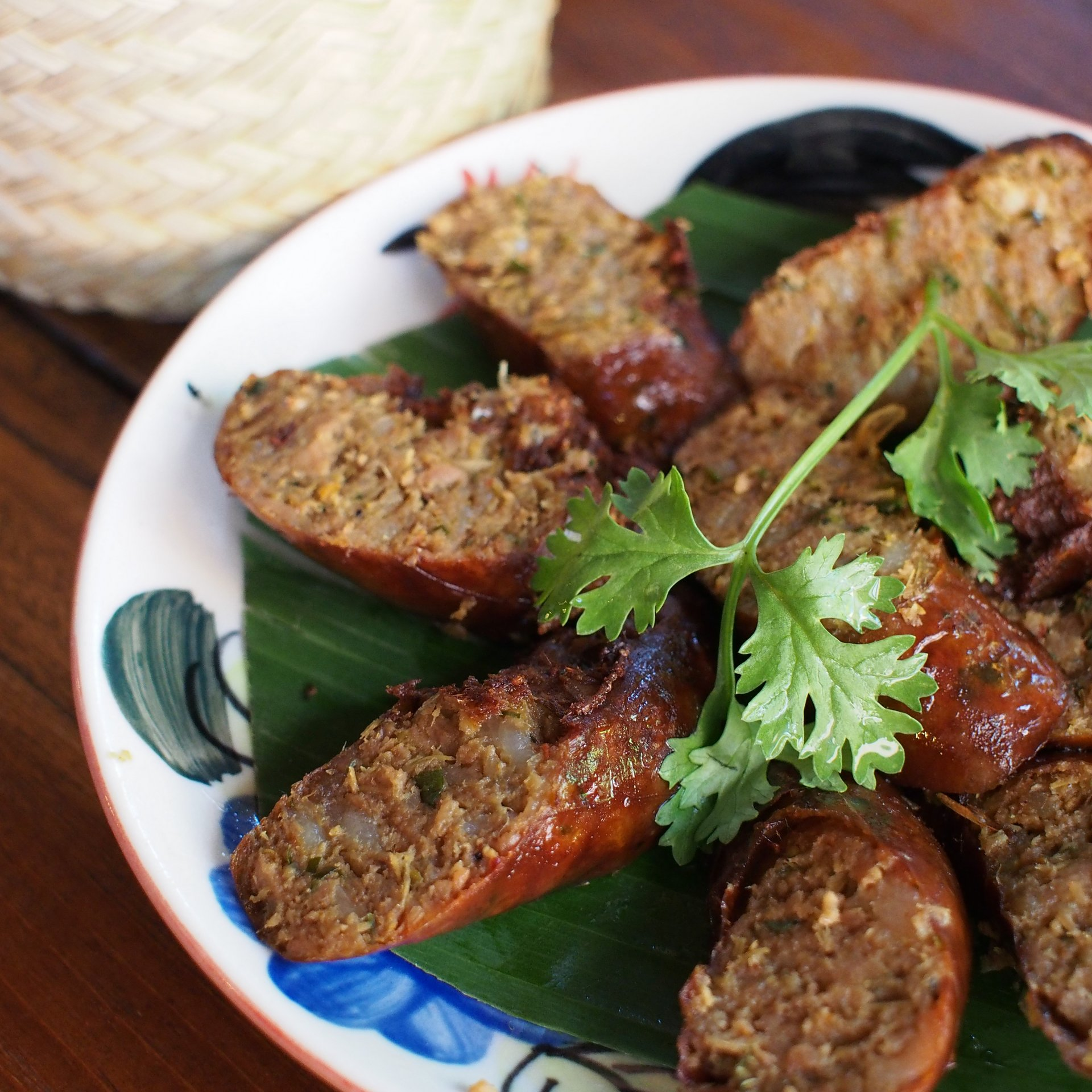
Sai ua

- Naem
- Sai krok Isan
- Sai krok pla naem
- Sai ua

=== Turkey ===
- Sucuk

=== Ukraine ===
- Blood sausage – Krov`janka ("krov" – blood)
- Gurka Sausage – offal sausage
- Kishka
- Liverwurst Pashtetivka
- Odesa Sausage
- Ukrainian Kovbasa

=== United Kingdom ===
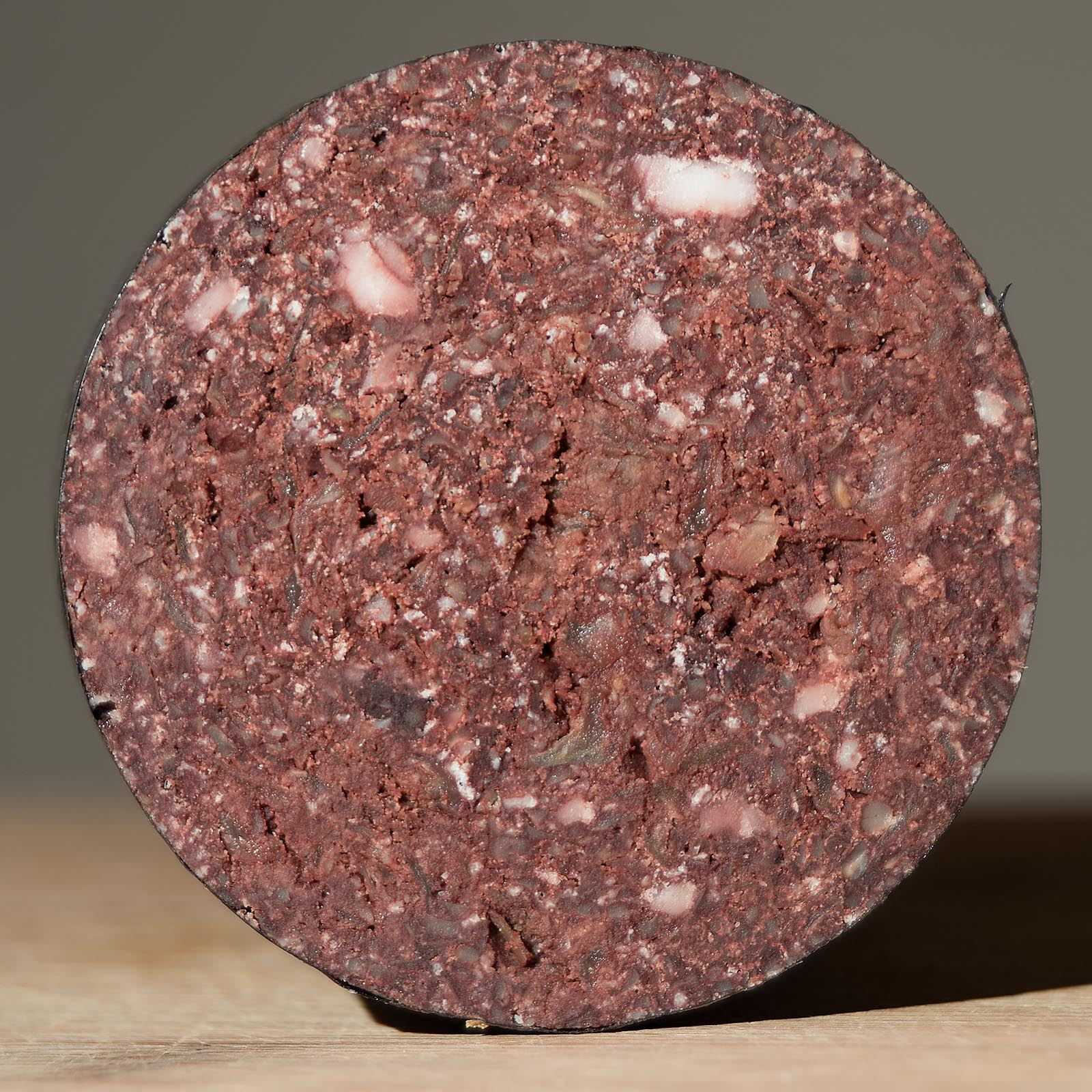
Cross section of a Stornoway black pudding. It was granted Protected Geographical Indicator of Origin status in May 2013 by The European Commission.

- Battered sausage – found all across the United Kingdom, Ireland, Australia and New Zealand
- Beef sausage
- Black pudding
- Chipolata
- Glamorgan sausage
- Hog's pudding
- Pork and leek (sometimes called Welsh sausage)
- Pork sausage
- Red pudding (mainly in Scotland)
- Sausage roll
- Saveloy
- Snorkers
- Stonner kebab
- Tomato sausage (pork and tomato)
- White pudding

==== English ====
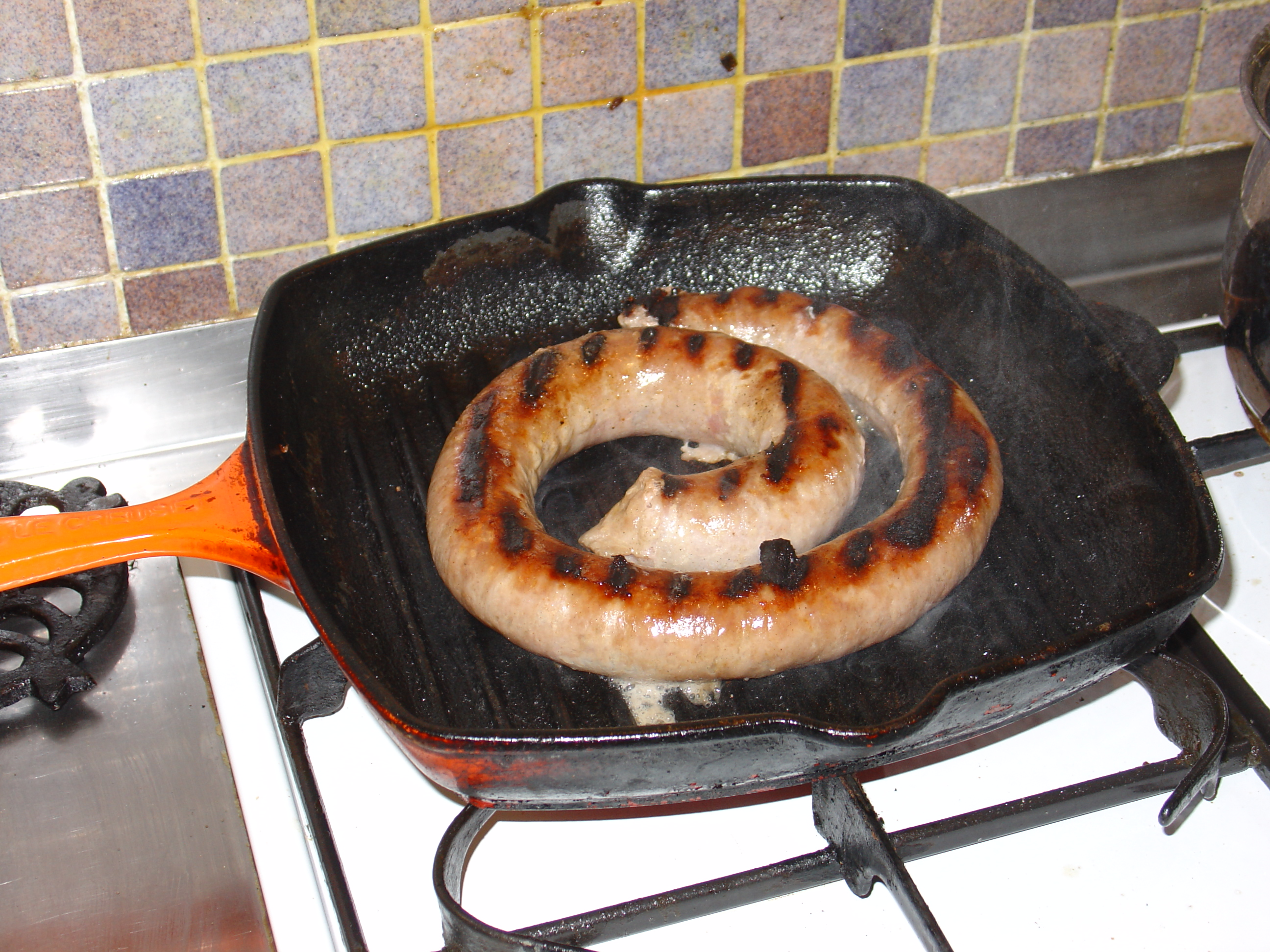
Cumberland sausage

- Braughing sausage, a product of Braughing, Hertfordshire
- Cumberland sausage
- Gloucester sausage – made from Gloucester Old Spot pork, which has a high fat content
- Letchworth – a traditional pork sausage with the addition of tomatoes
- Lincolnshire sausage
- Manchester sausage – prepared using pork, white pepper, mace, nutmeg, ginger, sage and cloves
- Marylebone sausage – a traditional London butchers sausage made with mace, ginger and sage
- Newmarket sausage
- Oxford sausage – pork, veal and lemon
- Pork and apple
- Yorkshire sausage – white pepper, mace, nutmeg and cayenne

==== Scottish ====
- Haggis
- Lorne sausage
- Stornoway black pudding

==== Welsh ====
- Dragon sausage – pork, leek and chili pepper sausage
- Glamorgan sausage

=== United States ===
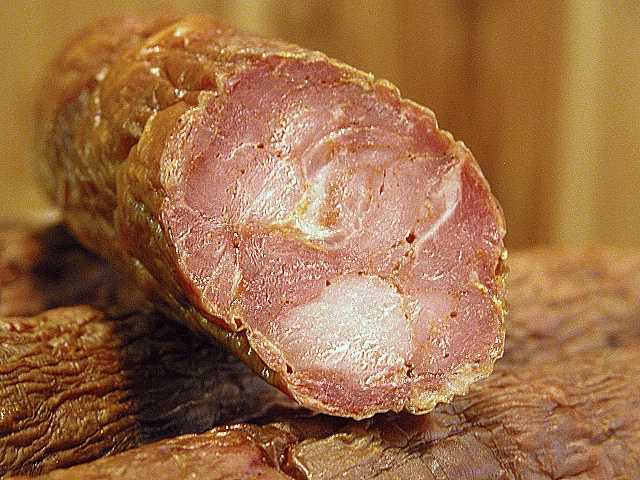
Cajun andouille

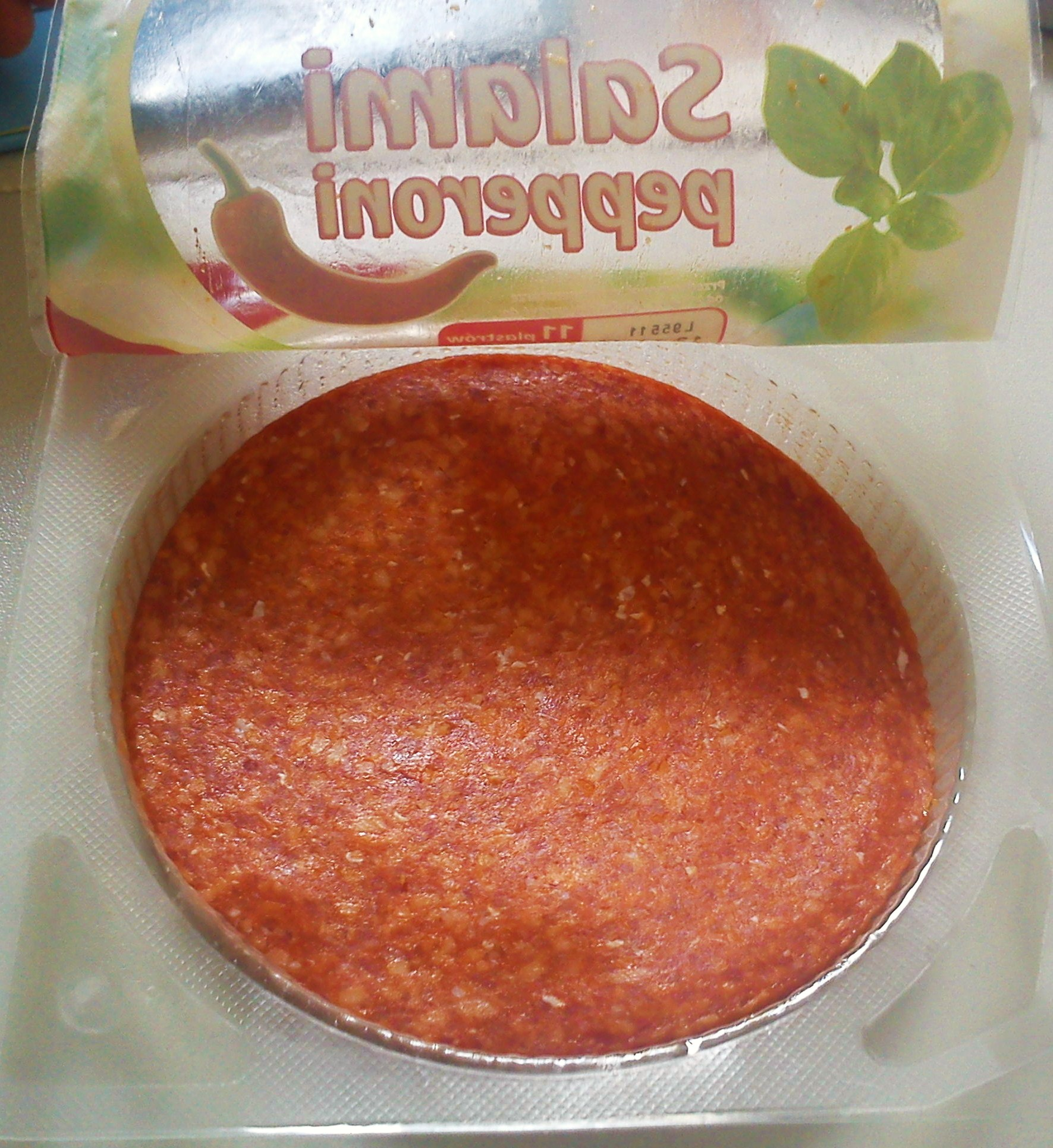
Packaged pepperoni slices

- Andouille
- Bockwurst in North America, resemble Bavarian Weisswurst
- Bologna sausage
- Boudin
- Breakfast sausage
- Chaudin
- Goetta
- Half-smoke – "local sausage delicacy" found in Washington, D.C., and the surrounding region
- Hog maw
- Hot dog
- Hot link
- Italian sausage
- Knoblewurst – a Jewish specialty; "a plump, beef sausage that's seasoned with garlic"
- Lebanon bologna
- New Orleans hot sausage
- Pepperoni
- Thuringer – in North America, refers to Thuringer cervelat, a summer sausage

=== Venezuela ===
- Chorizo
- Chistorra
- Morcilla

=== Vietnam ===
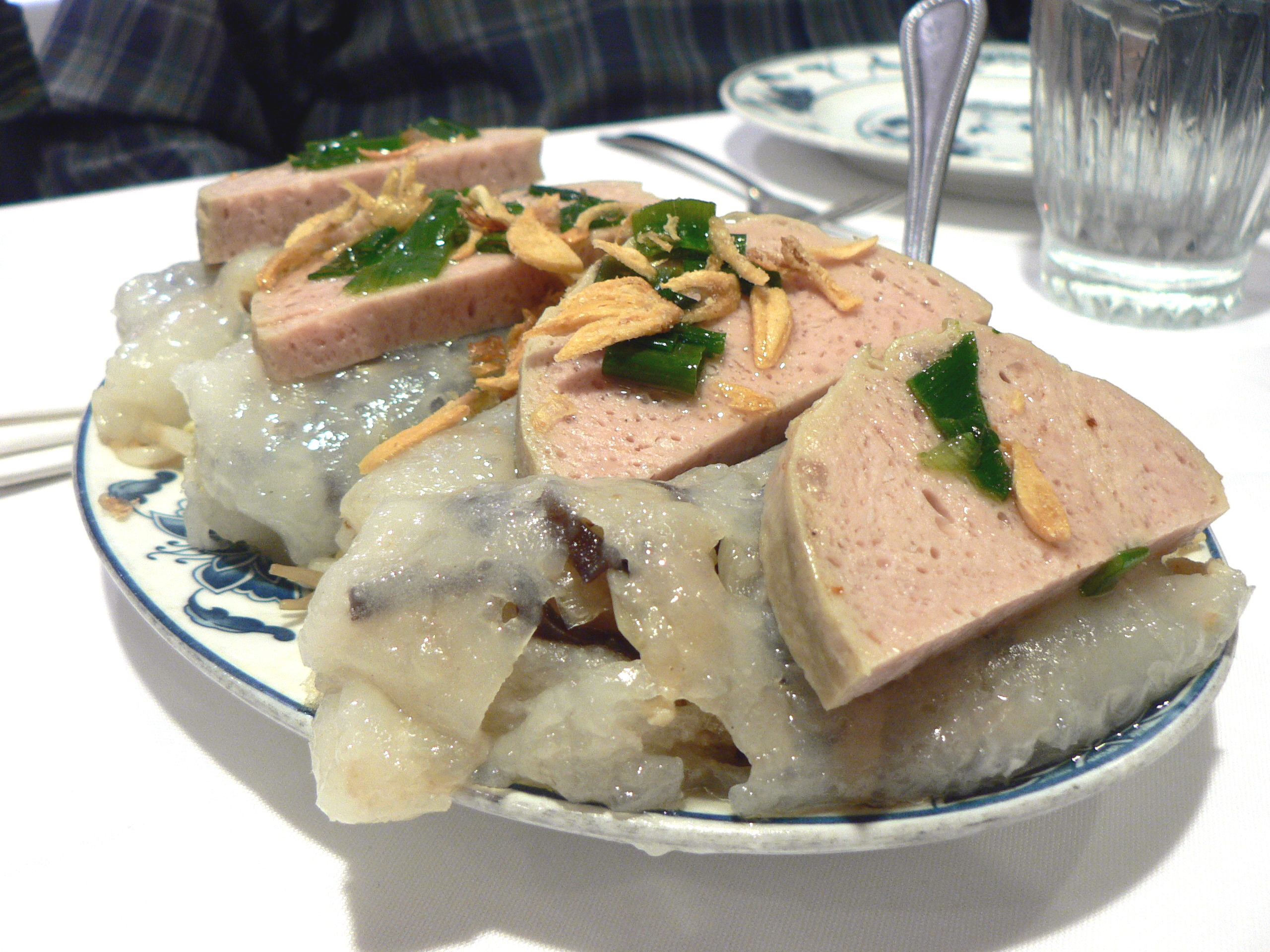
Sliced chả lụa served over bánh cuốn, and garnished with fried shallots

- Chả – Vietnamese types of sausage
- Chả lụa – Vietnamese sausage
- Dồi – Traditional sausage dish
- Lạp xưởng – Various types of sausage from China
- Nem chua – Vietnamese fermented pork dish
- Nem nướng – Vietnamese food item
- Tung lamaow (Cham: ꨓꨭꩂ ꨤꨟꨯꨱꨥ, Vietnamese: tung lò mò) – dried spiced Cham beef sausage, see also Malaysian "tongmo"

=== Zimbabwe ===
- Boerewors

== See also ==
- Bucyrus Bratwurst Festival
- Casing
- Global cuisine
- List of dried foods
- List of pork dishes
- List of sausage dishes
- List of smoked foods
- Salumeria
- Smoked meat
