= Baguio longganisa =

Filipino pork sausage

- Course: Sausage
- Place of origin: Philippines
- Region or state: Baguio
- Main ingredients: pork

Baguio longganisa is a Filipino pork sausage originating from the city of Baguio. It is a type of hamonado (sweet) longganisa.

== See also ==
- Pinuneg
- List of sausages

Baguio longganisa is not just the sweet "hamonado" type but they also have the "recado", garlicky salty kind.
