= Calumpit longganisa =

Filipino pork sausage

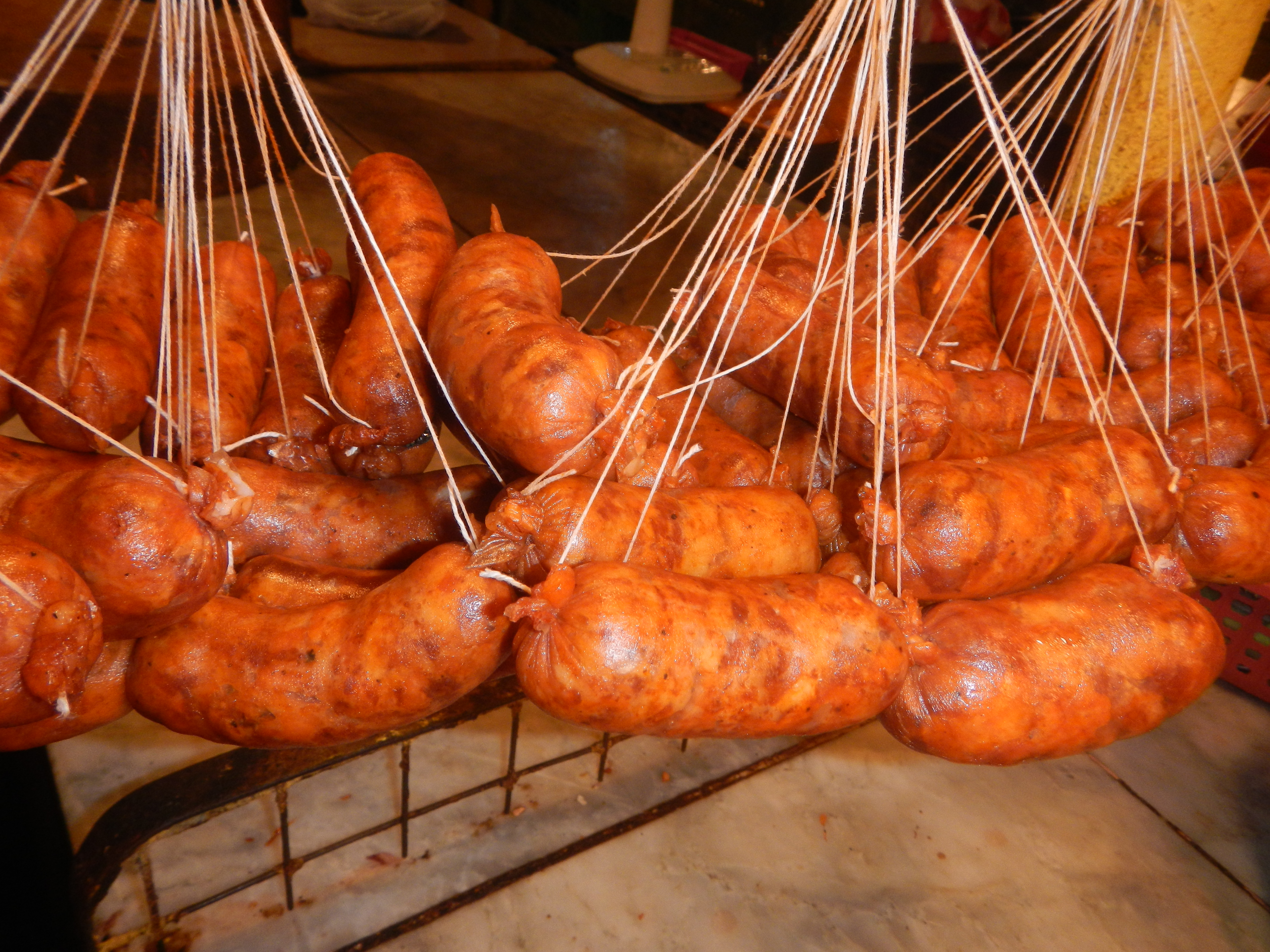
- Alternative names: Longganisang bawang, longganisang Calumpit
- Course: Sausage
- Place of origin: Philippines
- Region or state: Bulacan
- Main ingredients: pork

Calumpit longganisa, also known as longganisang bawang (lit. "garlic longaniza"), is a Filipino pork sausage originating from Calumpit, Bulacan, Philippines. It is a type of de recado longganisa. It is made with lean pork, pork fat, garlic, bay leaves, brown sugar, soy sauce, vinegar, salt, black pepper, paprika, and optionally, chili.

== Calumpit longganisa festival ==
On March 24-25, 2023, the town's 451st Founding Anniversary, Mayor Glorime M. Faustino led the 1st Calumpit longganisa Festival with a 514 meters "Longest Boodle Fight" along Pulilan Regional Road. 3,000 people who participated from Barangays Caniogan and Corazon ate the star "Longganisang Bawang" of Bikers Longganisa makers. Calumpit's 29 barangays residents joined the 500-meter longganisa boodle fight spread along the Calumpit-Pulilan Road, in its 2nd Longganisa Festival on 23 March 2024.

== See also ==
- List of sausages
