= Azaruja sausage =

Type of sausage from Portugal

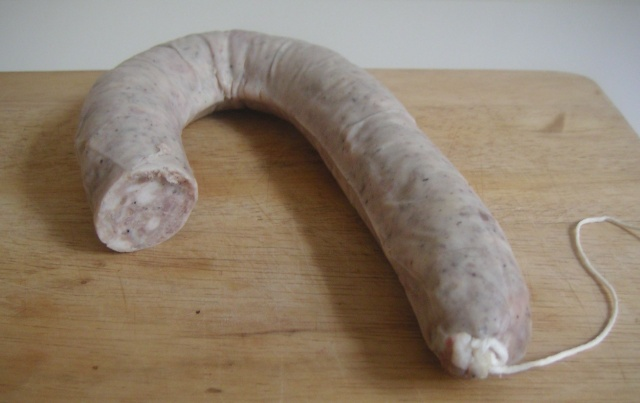
White botifarra

Azaruja sausage is a type of sausage from Azaruja, Évora, Alentejo, Portugal. It is listed on the Ark of Taste. They are produced seasonally during the pig harvest season from December until February. Alentejo black pig (more widely known as Iberian black pig). Other ingredients include spices and bread. The family recipes go back at least 150 years and the sausages are made in traditional home kitchens using Alentejan fireplaces.

Varieties include:

- Batateira: made with pork fat, cooked potatoes, garlic, pepper, salt and pork casing smoked over holm oak, cork oak or olive wood and then cooked "over a slow flame".
- Botifarra: Made with pig parts including ears, pork fat scraps, snout, and head seasoned with salt and pepper. The stuffed intestines are cooked. These sausages require refrigeration and eaten within two weeks of being prepared.
- Linguiça: made with ground pork leg, tripe and fat from the pig's head. Seasoned with garlic, salt, and pepper. It is dried for about two months and eaten raw.

== See also ==
- List of sausages
