= Nădlac sausage =

Romanian pork sausage

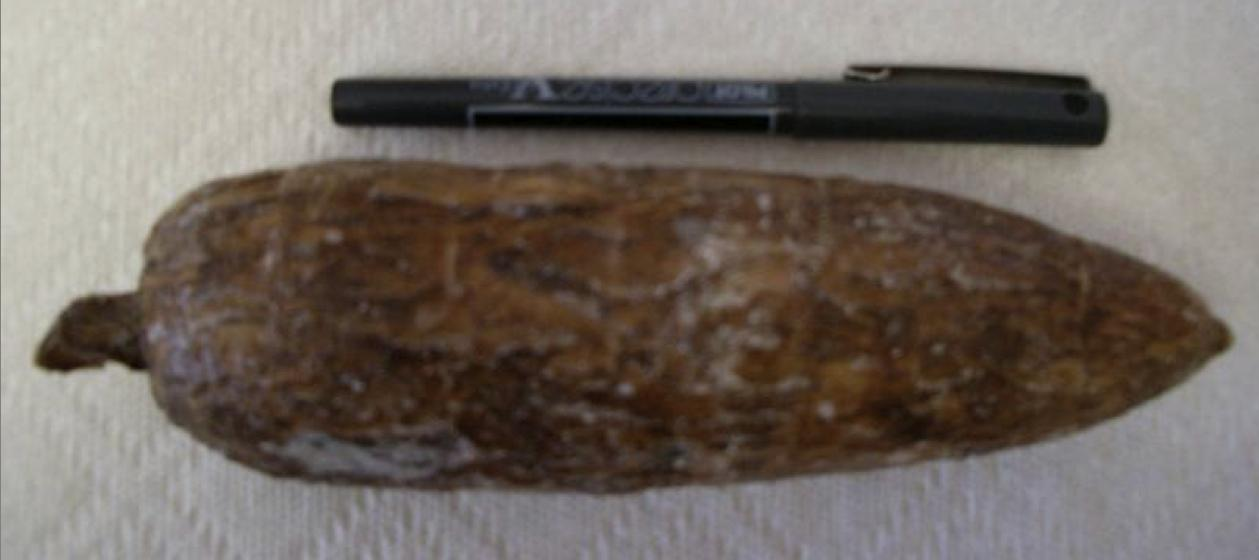
Nădlac sausage

Nădlac sausage (Romanian: salam de Nădlac) is a traditional Romanian pork sausage from Nădlac in Arad County.

The recipe is attested since the sixteenth century in Germany, has been improved upon, by Romanians. Nădlac sausage is greater, spiced with garlic, mustard, pepper, caraway, salt and sugar are added to the conservation process, and for tastes.

Maturation which includes smoking and drying, takes between four and six months where it loses about 40% of its weight. Nădlac sausage is smoked traditionally in summer with sawdust natural, usually plum, mulberry or beech.

In Romania, Nădlac sausage is registered as a traditional product.

== See also ==
- List of sausages
- List of smoked foods
