= Sremska kobasica =

Serbian sausage

Sremska sausage (in Serbian "sremska kobasica") is a type of sausage from Serbia. It has its origin in the Serbian area of Srem. It contains a mixture of beef and pork meat spiced with paprika, black pepper, salt and "secret spices". It is slightly smoked and medium ground.

== See also ==
- Serbian cuisine
- List of sausages
- List of smoked foods
