= Babic (sausage) =

Babic sausages are a Romanian sausage made from beef and pork and strongly seasoned with spices. The original recipe contains pork and beef and has Slavic origins (Serbian and Bulgarian). It usually has a reddish color due to ingredients (spices) and is similar to ghiudem sausage.

== See also ==
- List of sausages
