= Prasky =

Coarse-ground sausage

Prasky, sometimes spelled praski, is a type of coarse-ground summer sausage or salami related to a German Thuringer sausage, or Plockwurst (not to be confused with a Thuringer-style bratwurst). It is also very closely related to several Hungarian sausages, Czech-style Prague sausage (called pražská klobása), and numerous other eastern European "soft" salamis.

Prasky is found throughout the US Great Lakes region and is credited as being unique to Chicago. Prasky is typically sliced thinly and served on a sandwich using rye bread, Swiss cheese, pickles, and a spicy mustard.
