= Pleșcoi sausages =

Romanian sausage

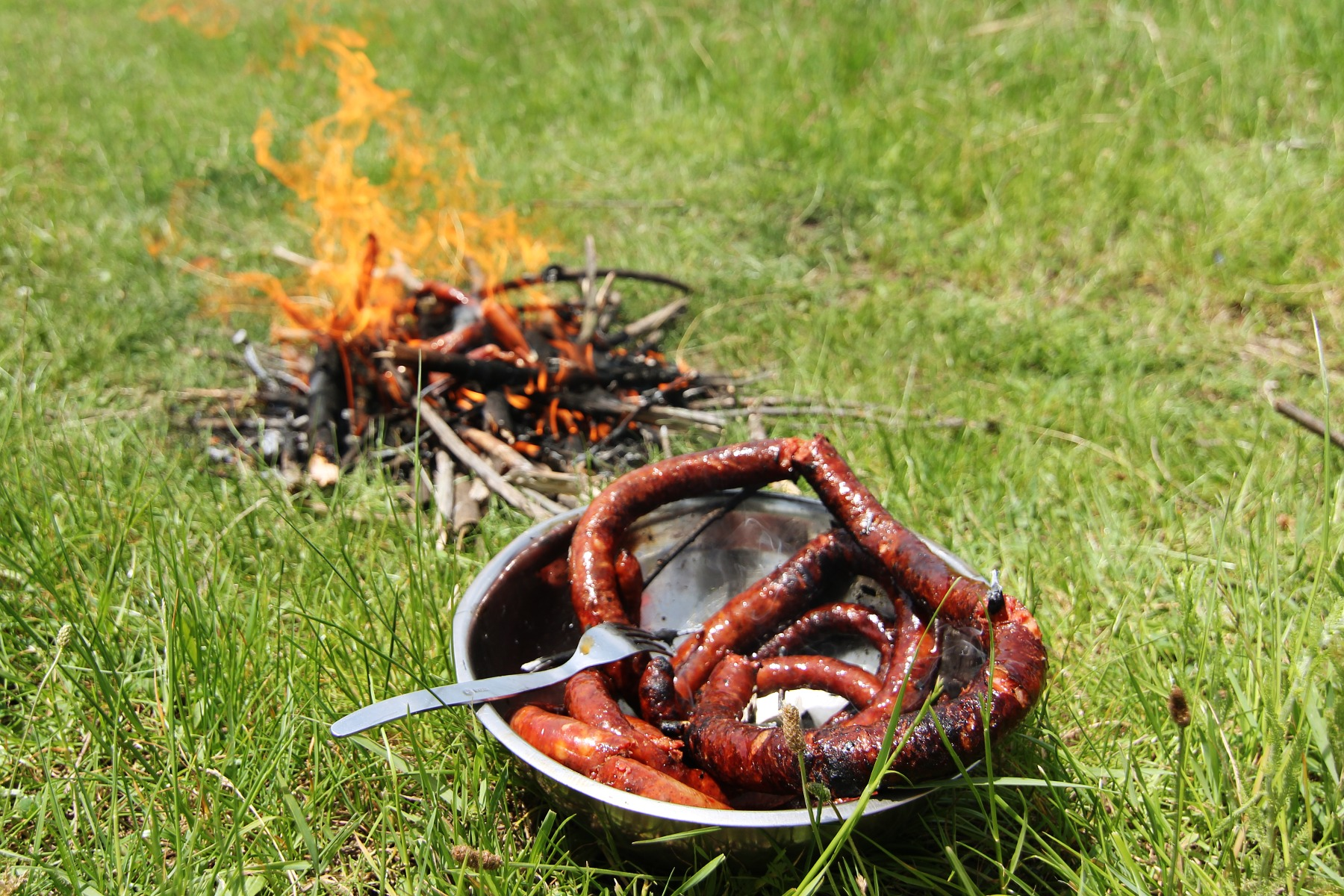
Pleșcoi sausages cooked on an open fire

Pleșcoi sausages are a Romanian sausage made from mutton spiced with chili peppers and garlic, traditionally made in and around the Pleșcoi village, in the Buzău County of Romania. If the mutton contains too much fat, it can be balanced with beef, but with no more than half of the mutton content.

Pleșcoi sausages has been registered as a protected geographical indication (PGI) product in the European Union.

== History ==
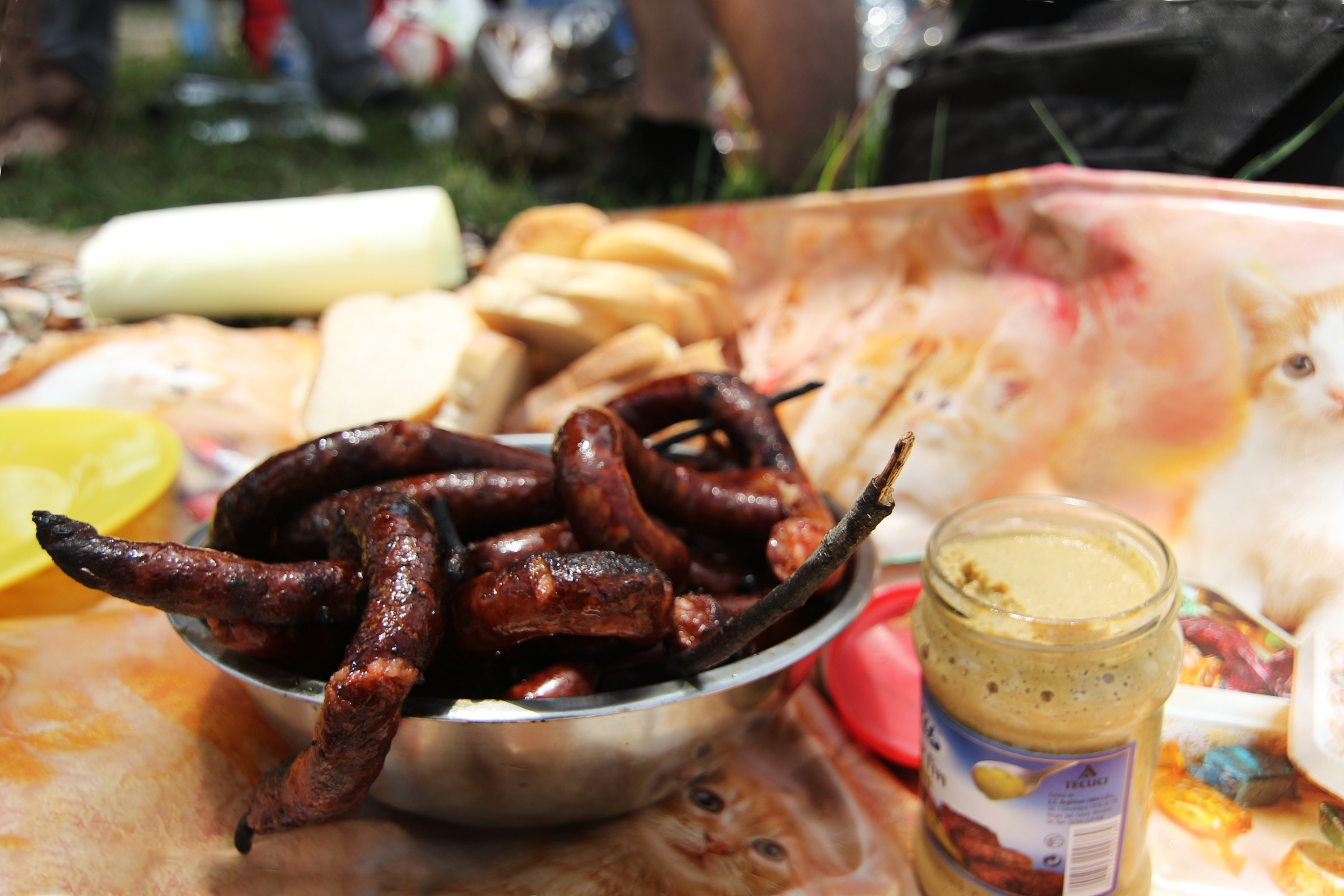
Pleșcoi sausages served with mustard and bread

== See also ==
- List of lamb dishes
