= Csabai =

Csabai is a Hungarian surname. Notable people with the surname include:

- Dóra Csabai (born 1989), Hungarian water polo player
- Edvin Csabai (born 1976), Hungarian marathon canoeist
- Judit Csabai (politician) (born 1947), Hungarian politician
- Judit Csabai (swimmer) (born 1973), Hungarian swimmer
