= Pinuneg =

Filipino blood sausage

- Course: Blood sausage
- Place of origin: Philippines
- Region or state: Cordillera highlands
- Main ingredients: pork blood

Pinuneg is a Filipino blood sausage originating from the Igorots. It is made with pig's blood (sometimes cow's or carabao's blood), minced pork fat, salt, red onions, ginger, and garlic stuffed into a casing made from pig's small intestine. It is traditionally prepared during pig sacrifice ceremonies.
