= Chorizo de Cantimpalos =

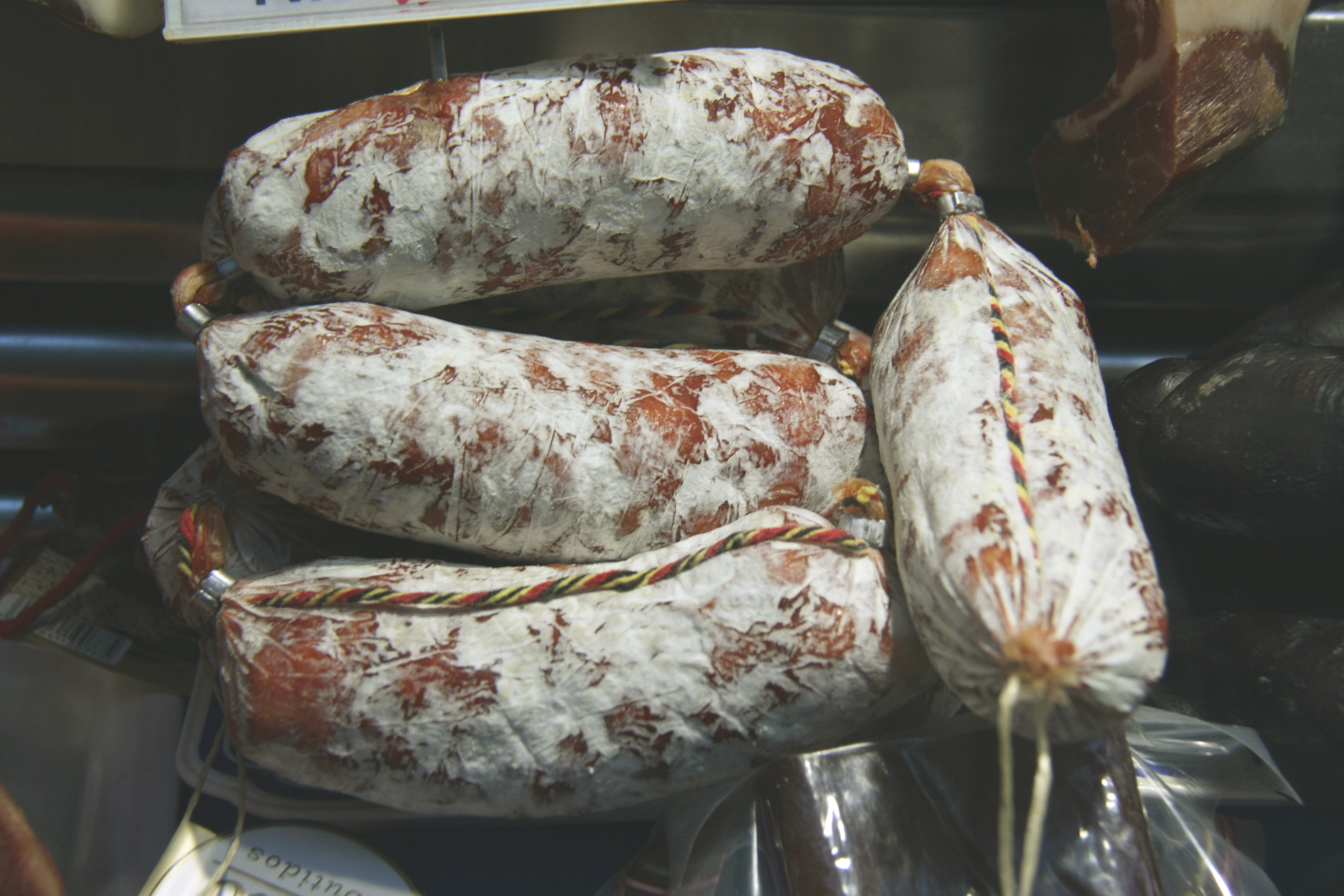
Strings of chorizos de Cantimpalos.

Chorizo de Cantimpalos is a protected geographical indication (PGI) of chorizo produced in the province of Segovia, Spain.

Chorizo began to be produced on an industrial basis in the area of Cantimpalos c. 1900, with instances of exports (including to Mexico) dating to 1928.

The PGI jurisdiction, created in 2008, spans 75 municipalities of the province of Segovia, with factories located in Villacastín, La Lastrilla, La Losa, Bernuy de Porreros, Cantimpalos, Valseca, Carbonero el Mayor and Tabanera la Luenga. The embutido is typically made of 70% pork lean parts; 26% pork fat; 2% salt; 2% smoked paprika, garlic, and oregano; and it is presented in three formats: sarta, achorizado, and cular.
