= Chicken longganisa =

Filipino chicken sausage

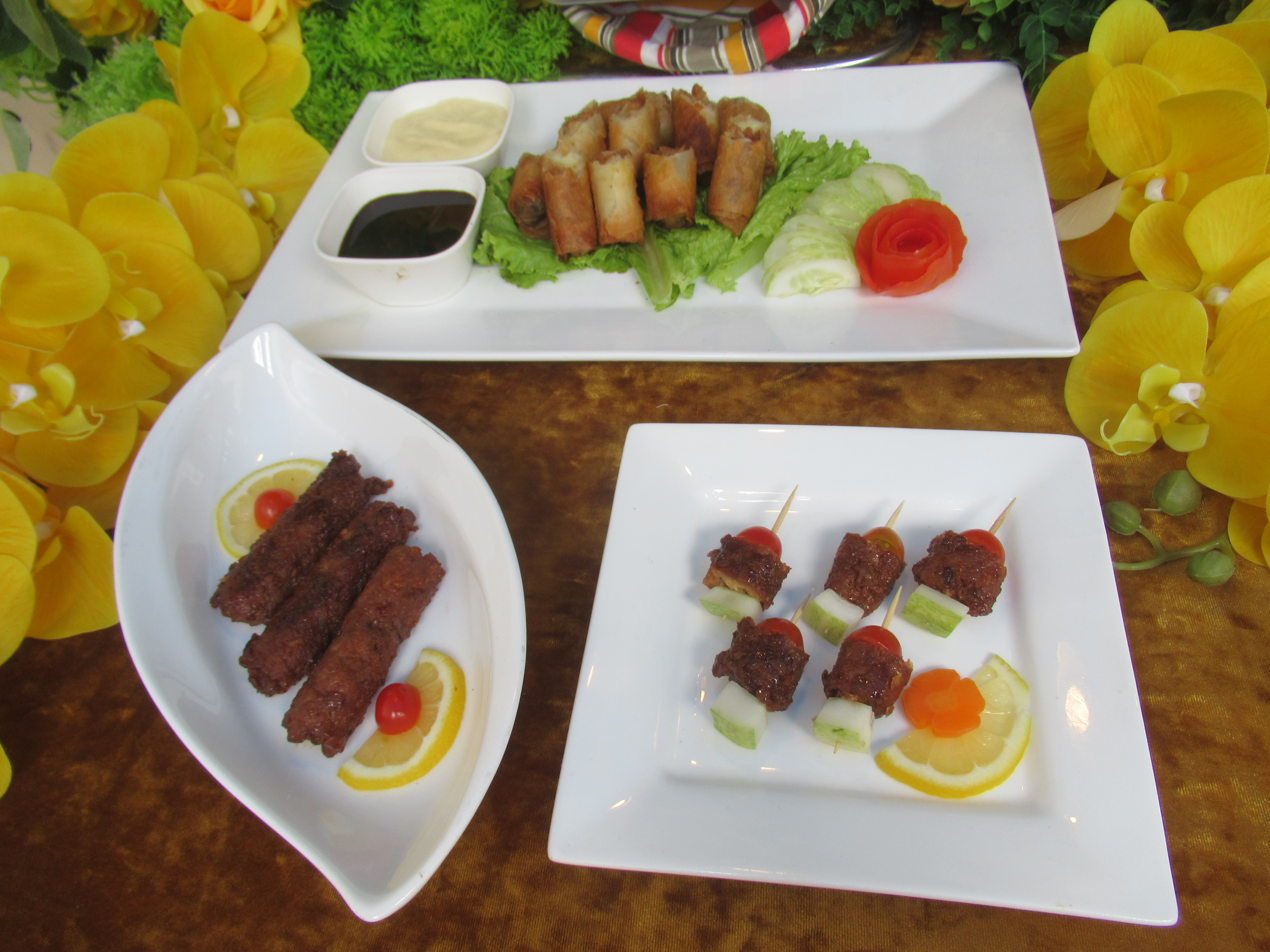
- Alternative names: Chicken longaniza, longganisang manok
- Course: Sausage
- Place of origin: Philippines
- Main ingredients: chicken

Chicken longganisa is a Filipino fresh sausage made with minced chicken meat, garlic, onion, soy sauce, muscovado sugar, salt, vinegar, and black pepper. Vegetable extenders can also be added like carrots, turnips, or jicamas. It is sold as a healthier alternative to other kinds of longganisa. It is usually prepared without the casing ("skinless"), and is molded into shape with the use of wax paper.

== See also ==
- Cabanatuan longganisa
- Fish longganisa
- List of sausages
