= Guagua longganisa =

Filipino pork sausage

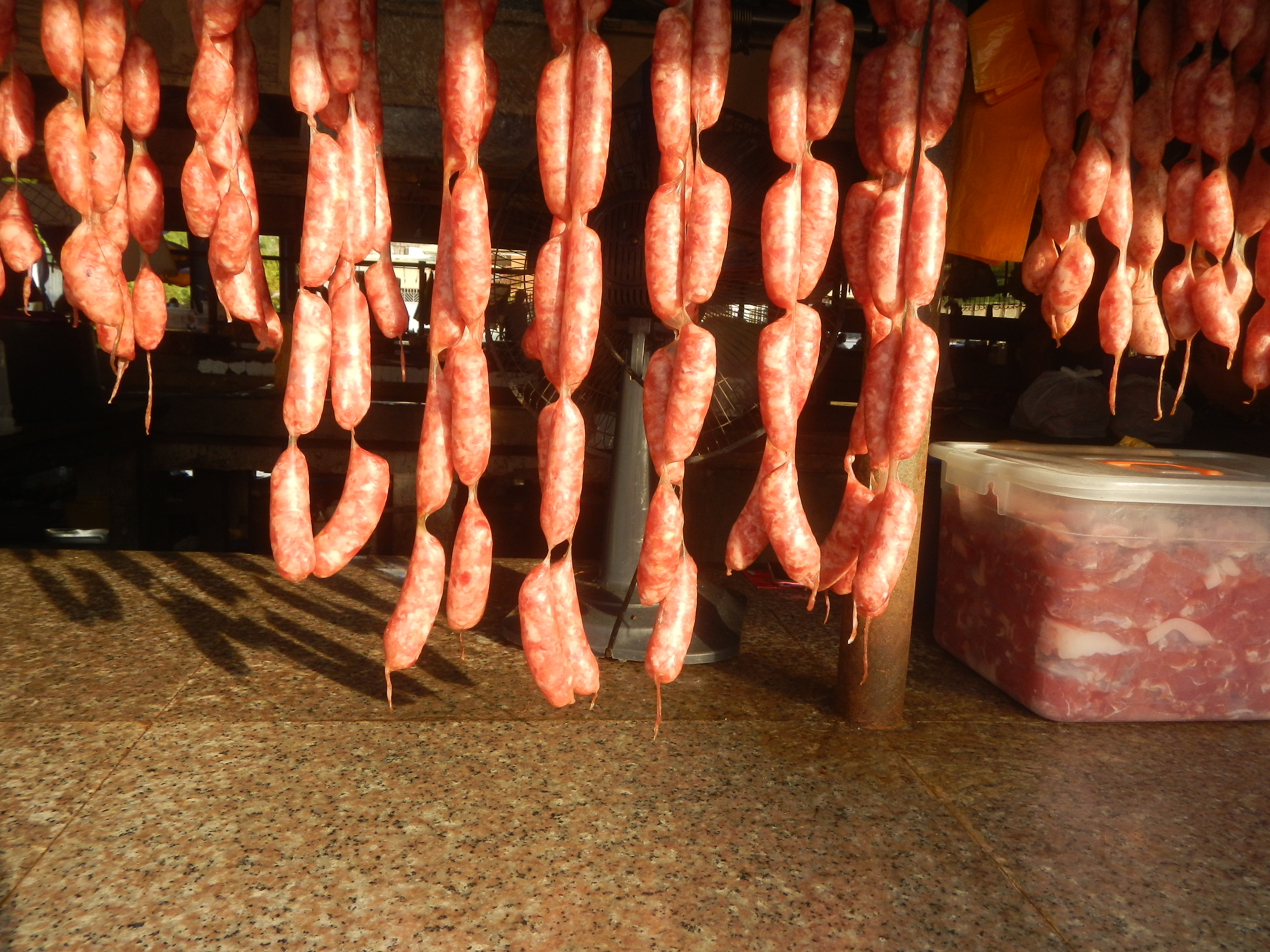
- Alternative names: Candaba longganisa
- Course: Sausage
- Place of origin: Philippines
- Region or state: Guagua, Pampanga
- Main ingredients: pork

Guagua longganisa, also known as Candaba longganisa, is a Filipino pork sausage originating from the towns of Guagua and Candaba, Pampanga. It is a type of de recado longganisa characterized by its salty and sour taste because of its heavier use of vinegar in comparison to other Filipino sausages.

== See also ==
- Pampanga longganisa, a sweet longganisa also from Pampanga
- List of sausages
