= Chorizo de Macao =

Filipino dry pork sausage

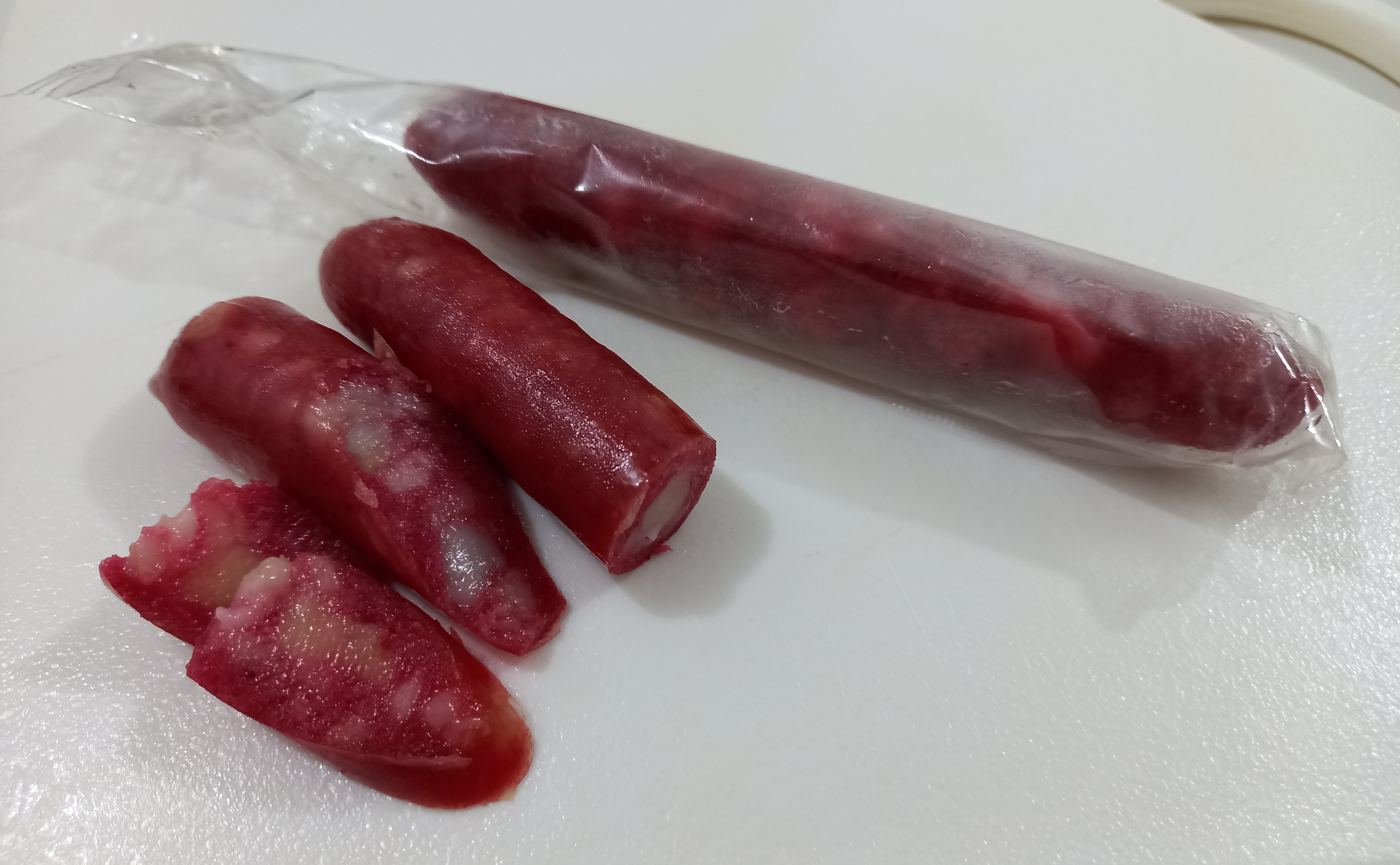
- Alternative names: Chorizo de Macau, chorizo Macau, Chinese chorizo, longaniza Macau, longganisang Macau
- Course: Sausage
- Place of origin: Philippines
- Main ingredients: pork, anise liqueur

Chorizo de Macao, sometimes called longaniza Macau, is a Filipino dry pork sausage. The ingredients of chorizo de Macao are identical to those of other Filipino sweet longganisas (longganisa hamonado), except for its dry texture and its use of star anise, aniseed, or anise liqueur (anisado), which gives it its distinctive aroma. Despite the name, it does not originate from Macau or China. It acquired its name due to the use of star anise and similar flavors, which are typically regarded as Chinese spices in Filipino cuisine. It originates from the Tagalog regions of the Philippines.

It is commonly used in Chinese Filipino dishes like pancit canton and siopao. It is sometimes confused with and used in place of Chinese sausage.

== See also ==
- Chorizo de Bilbao
- Chorizo de Cebu
- List of sausages
