= Choripán =

Sausage-filled Latin American sandwich

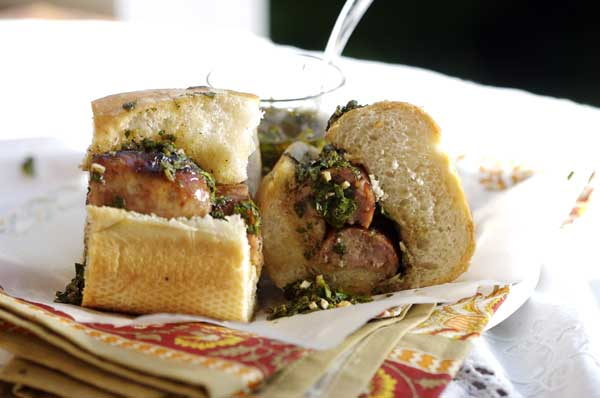
- Type: Sandwich
- Region or state: Southern Cone
- Main ingredients: Crusty bread (baguette), chorizo

Choripán (plural: choripanes) is a type of asado sandwich with grilled chorizo. It is popular in Argentina, Chile, Uruguay, Paraguay, Peru, Ecuador, Bolivia and Venezuela. The name comes from the combination of the names of its ingredients: a grilled chorizo sausage and a crusty bread (Spanish: pan) such as a pan batido, baguette, or francés.

== In various countries ==
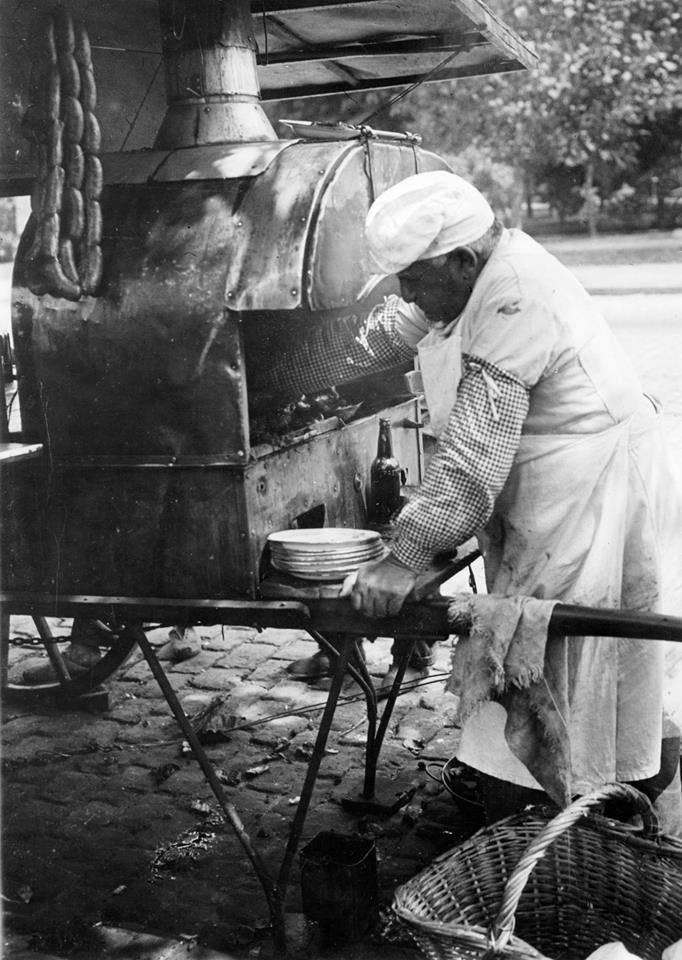
A choripán street vendor in Buenos Aires, 1925

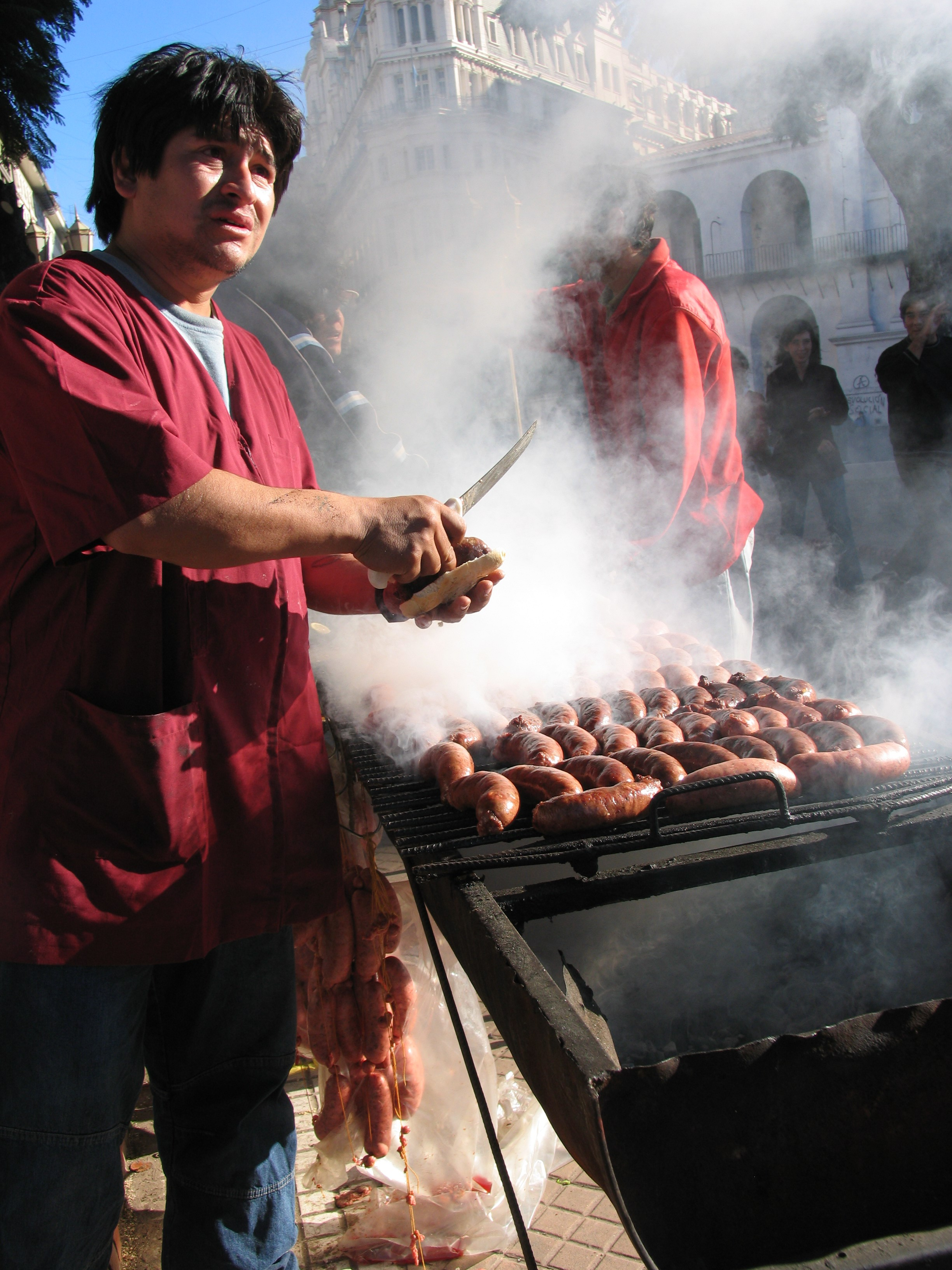
Street sale of choripanes in Plaza de Mayo, Buenos Aires, Argentina during a political rally. There are no permanent choripán sellers in Plaza de Mayo.

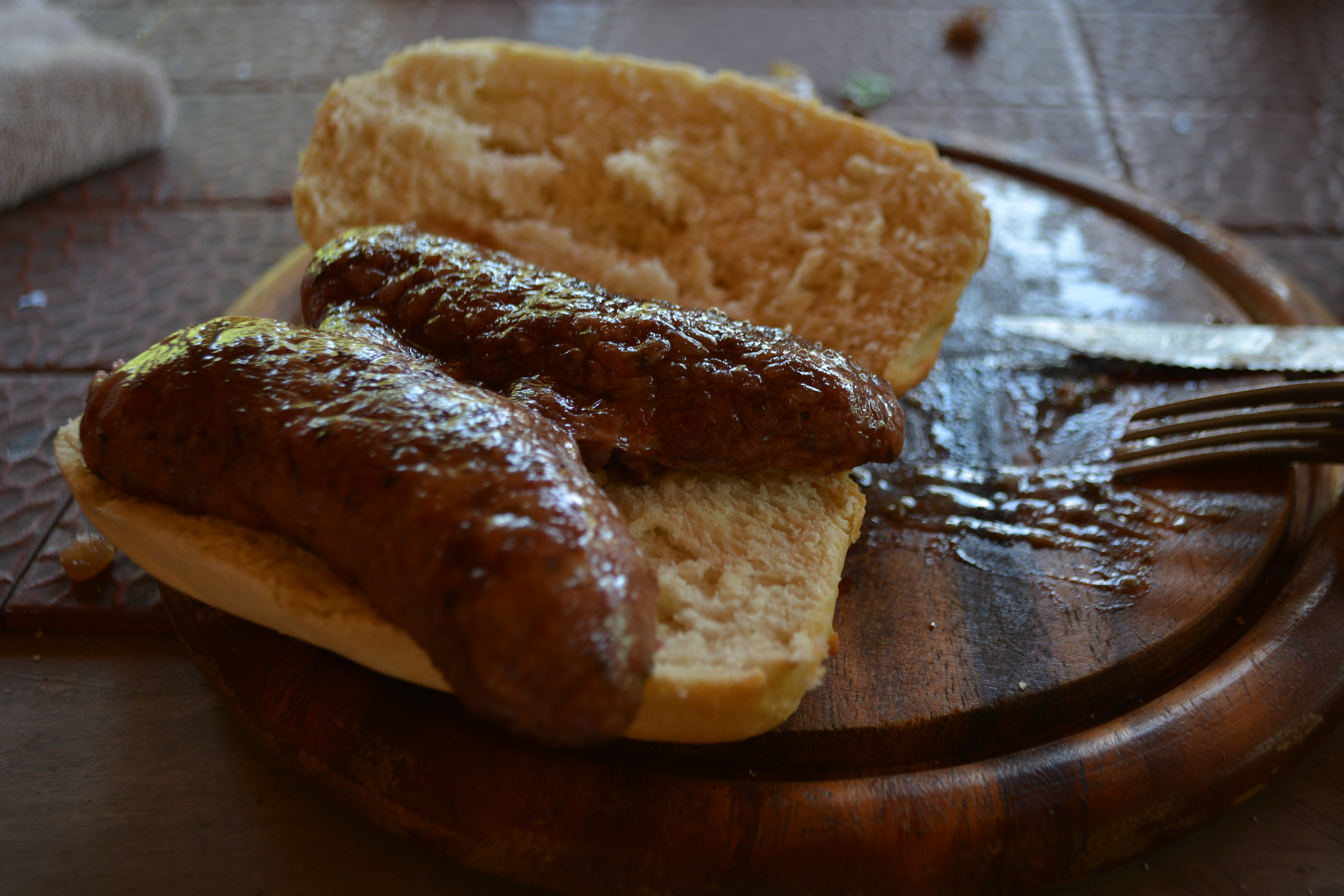
Homemade choripán with chorizo sausage recently hot off from an asado grill.

=== Argentina ===
The Argentine choripán consists of a sausage made out of beef and pork, hot off the grill, split down the middle, and served on a roll. The chorizo may be used whole or cut in half lengthwise, in which case it is called a mariposa (butterfly). It is customary to add sauces on the bread, most likely chimichurri.

Choripanes are commonly served as an appetizer during the preparation of an asado, but they are also very commonly sold at sport venues (particularly football games) and on the sides of roads and streets in major cities in Argentina. Taxi drivers in Buenos Aires are avid consumers and some street sellers can gather a long line of cabs during lunch time and afternoons when drivers get their lunch break.

A variant of choripán called morcipán, made with morcilla (blood sausage), is popular in the Río de la Plata region.

=== Brazil ===
There are several Brazilian versions of choripán, the one most resembling the Argentinian version is called salsipão, and made, in southern Brazil, with pão francês (meaning 'French bread', often called a Portuguese roll) and pork sausage. It is often served as an appetizer during the preparation of a churrasco, or even as a substitute for barbecues, because salsipães are much cheaper, easier, and quicker to make. Elsewhere in the country, there are many variations on the popular sanduíche de linguiça (literally "sausage sandwich"), most also made with pão francês, and pork sausage, but other breads and sausages can also be found. Possible additions to the basic recipe include melted cheese, requeijão, sautéed onions, vinaigrette sauce, shoestring potatoes, mustard, hot sauce, and many others. It is usually served as a casual meal, perhaps with a cold beer, very popularly on road-side dinners.

=== Chile ===
In Chile, choripanes are very popular, particularly consumed as a classic appetizer during asados. They are traditionally served in marraqueta and topped with ají and pebre; mayonnaise is also commonly used. Chilean choripanes are also made with longanizas instead of chorizos.

=== United States ===
On the U.S. mainland, choripanes are commonly available at lunch counters in Miami's Cuban diners and cafes, where the sandwich is customarily served on Cuban bread and topped with raw or fried onion and popularly eaten with a tropical fruit shake. In Puerto Rico, choripanes are usually sold in bakeries, and they consist of a Spanish-style chorizo such as chistorra or cantimpalo, pickles and mayonnaise inside a typical homemade Dominican bread called "pan de agua". Other ingredients may be added, Manchego cheese and ketchup being popular ones.

=== Uruguay ===
The chorizo is sausage made of pork, and may be used whole or cut in half lengthwise. Usually chimichurri is used as well as mayonnaise; sometimes Uruguayans tend to add tomatoes and lettuce. The sandwich is served in a baguette or in pan catalán (a sliced soft bread roll), except at football matches where it is served in a simple bread roll or hamburger-type bun.
