= Fish longganisa =

Filipino fish sausage

- Course: Sausage
- Place of origin: Philippines
- Main ingredients: fish (typically tuna, tilapia, or milkfish)

Fish longganisa, or fish chorizo, is a Filipino sausage made with fish instead of pork or beef. It is typically made from tuna, tilapia, or milkfish. It is prepared identically to other Filipino longganisa and is marketed as a healthier alternative. It may use regular pork casings, vegetable-based casings, or be prepared "skinless" (without the casing).

== See also ==
- Cabanatuan longganisa
- Chicken longganisa
- List of sausages
