= Chorizo de Cebu =

Filipino pork sausage

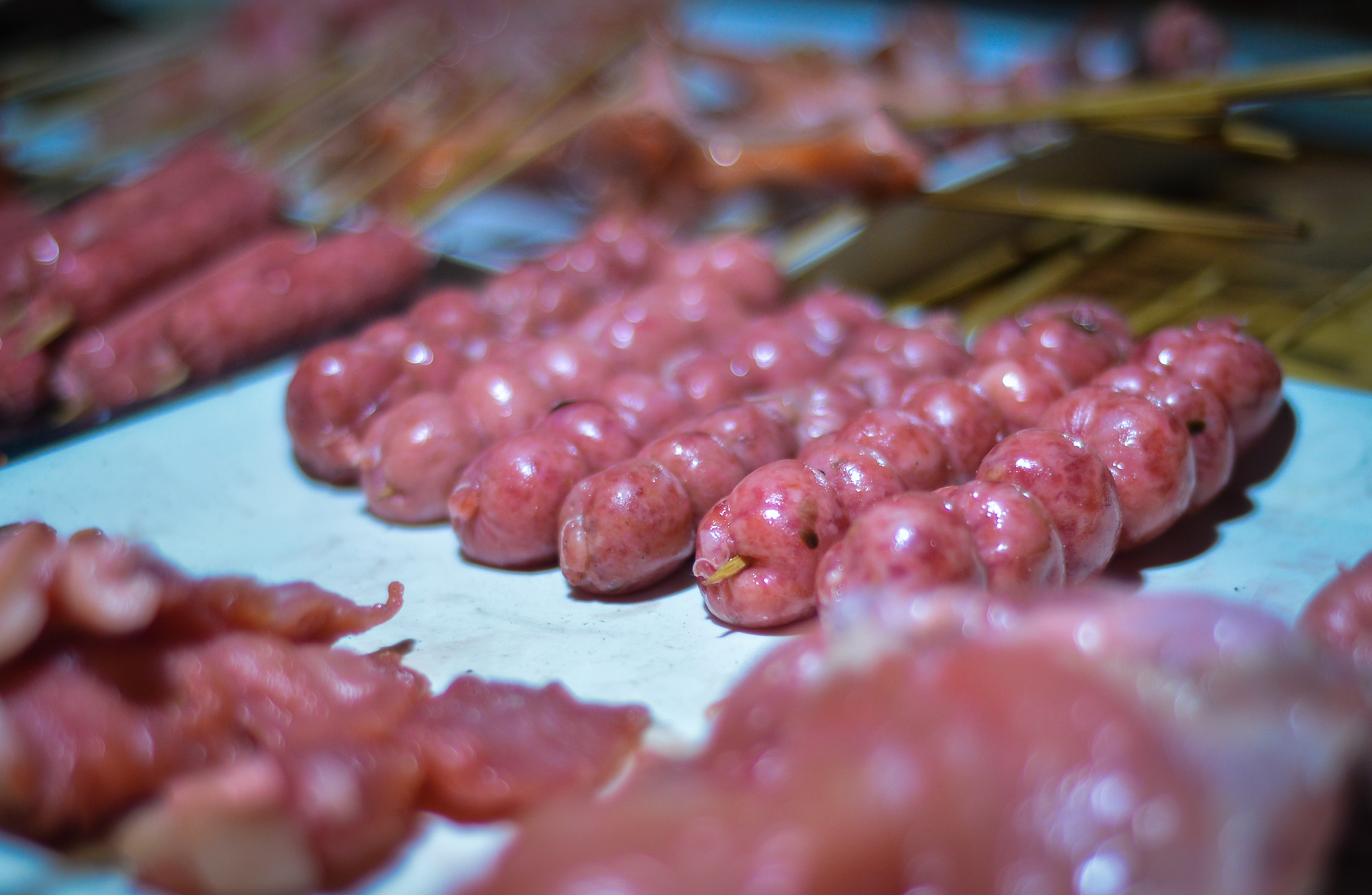
- Alternative names: Longganisa de Cebu
- Course: Sausage
- Place of origin: Philippines
- Region or state: Cebu
- Main ingredients: pork

Chorizo de Cebu, also known as longganisa de Cebu, is a Filipino pork sausage originating from Cebu. It is a type of hamonada (sweet) longganisa. They are distinctively red in color due to the use of achuete seeds. Each link is also usually spherical in shape. It is made from ground lean pork, ground pork fat, salt, saltpeter, sugar, anise liqueur (anisado), paprika, black pepper, garlic, and chilis to taste in a hog casing. It can also be made without the casing. They are usually fried or grilled and eaten with white rice, puso, or garlic rice for breakfast.

== See also ==
- Chorizo de Macao
- List of sausages
