= Vigan longganisa =

Filipino pork sausage

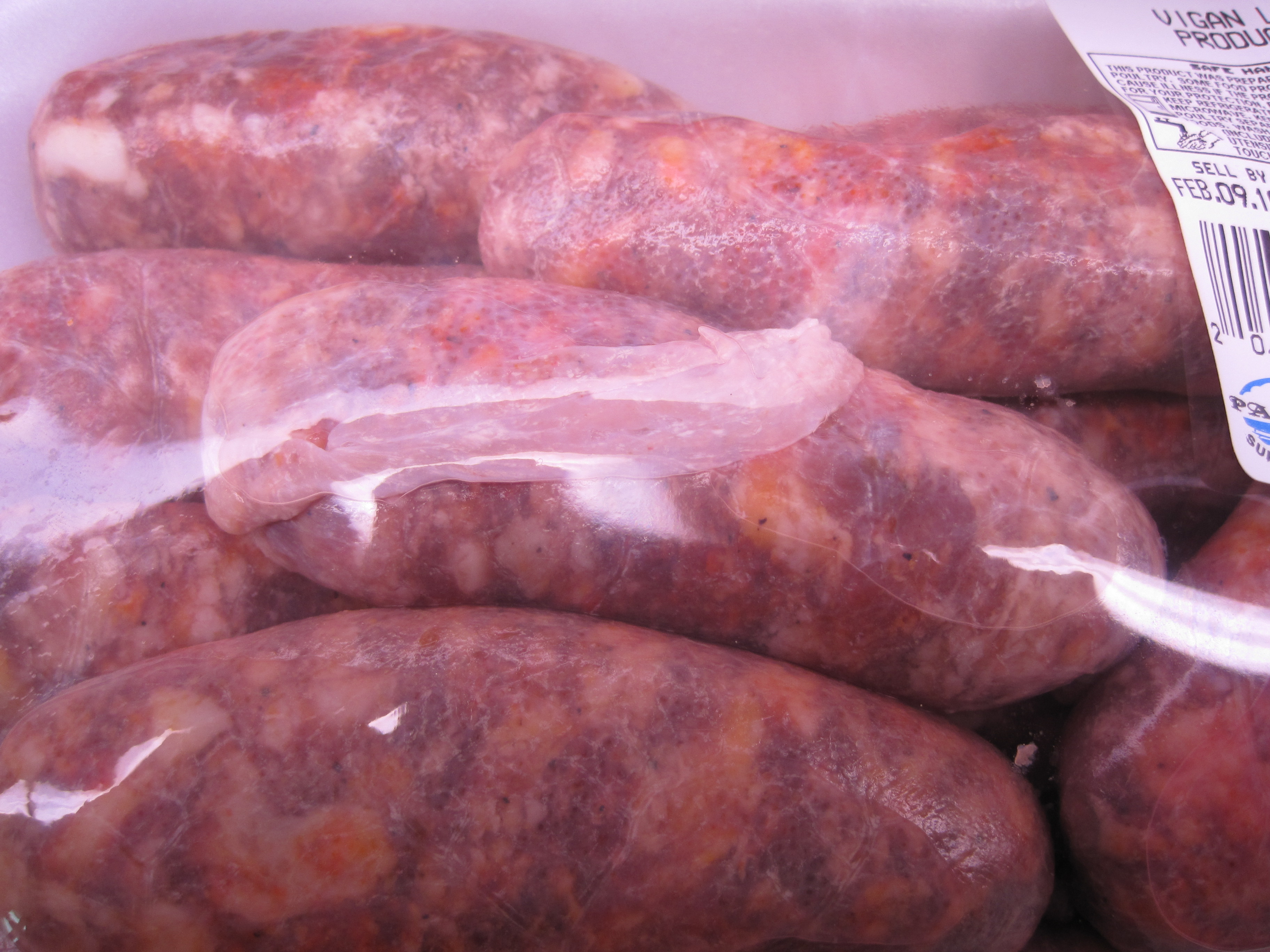
- Course: Sausage
- Place of origin: Philippines
- Region or state: Vigan, Ilocos Sur
- Main ingredients: pork

Vigan longganisa, also known as the Ilocano longganisa, is a Filipino pork sausage originating from Vigan City, Ilocos Sur. It is a type of de recado longganisa noted for its salty, garlicky, and sour flavor. It is air-dried, made with ground lean pork, annatto, coarsely ground pork and fat, brown sugar, garlic, onions, bay leaves, soy sauce, vinegar, black pepper, and salt to taste in hog casings. Chili flakes may also be added. The sausages are celebrated in an annual "Longganisa Festival" in Vigan City.

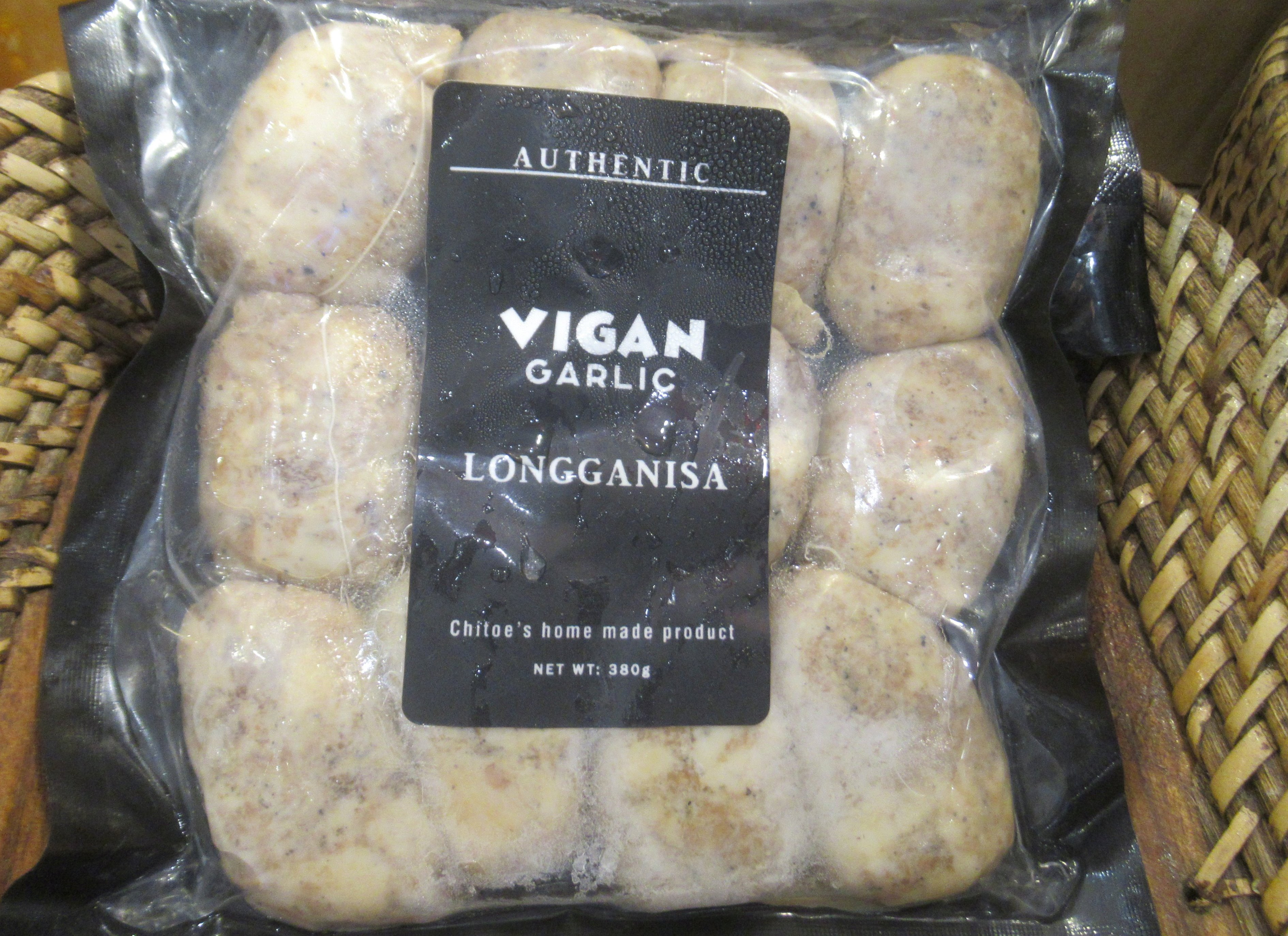
Garlic flavor

== Longganiza festival ==
Mayor Jose 'Bonito' Singson, Jr. led the 2024 Grand Parade of Vigan City Fiesta and Vigan longganisa Festival. On January 22, 2024, Vigan launched '101 Ways to Cook Longganisa' cookbook for the January 18-27, 2024 Longganisa Festival.

== See also ==
- List of sausages
