= Chorizo de Bilbao =

Type of Philippine pork and beef dry sausage

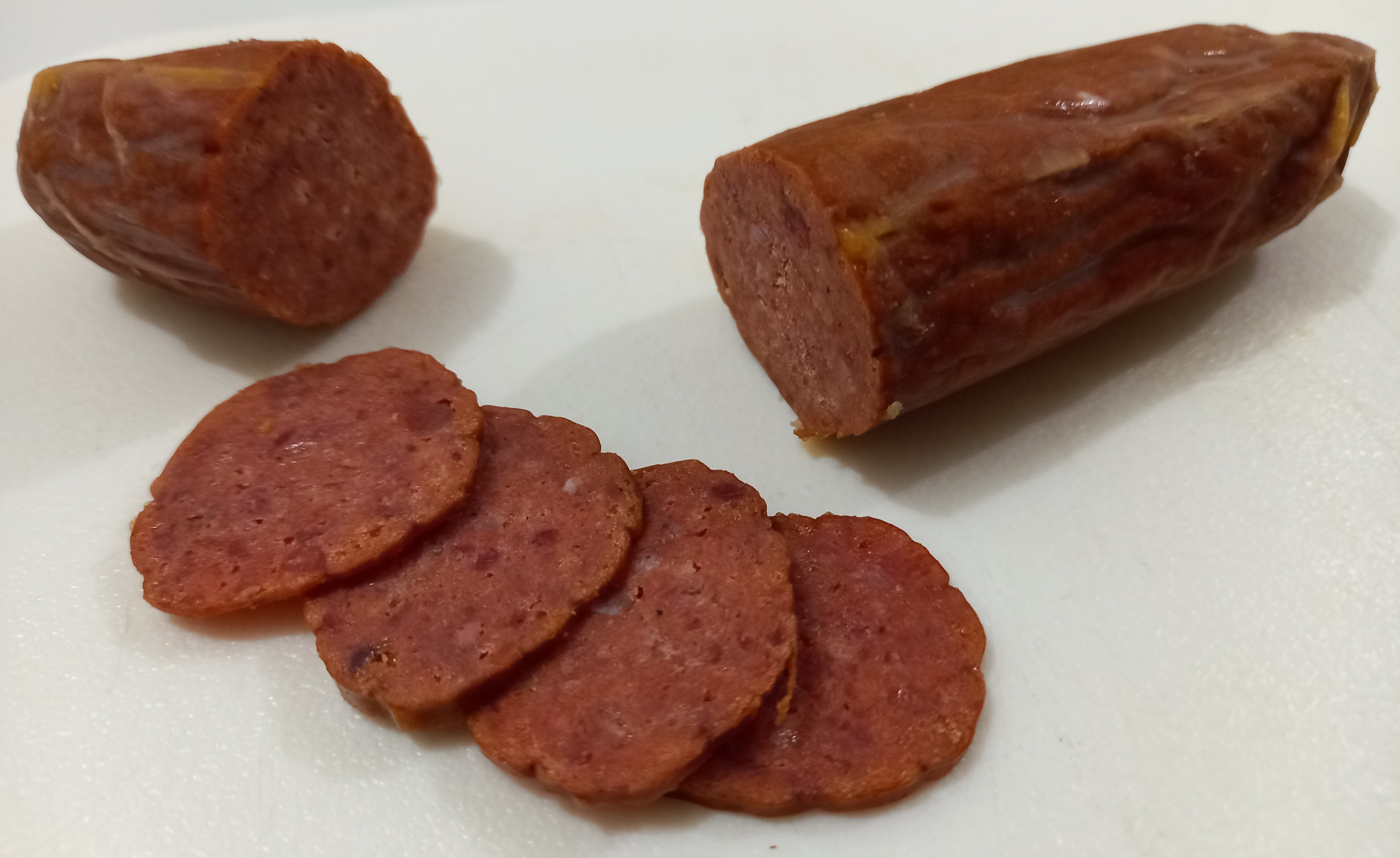
- Alternative names: Chorizo Bilbao, choriso Bilbao
- Course: Sausage
- Place of origin: Philippines
- Main ingredients: pork, beef, paprika

Chorizo de Bilbao, also known as chorizo Bilbao, is a type of Philippine pork and beef dry sausage. It was originally produced by Spanish Filipino Vicente Genato of the Genato Commercial Corporation in Manila and the name is a genericized trademark originating from the branding coined by Genato from his family's original home city of Bilbao, Spain.

Today, most of the production has shifted to the American company Marca El Rey, who copied the branding. The sausages are popular in the Philippines and among Philippine American communities in the United States. The ingredients of Chorizo de Bilbao are mostly identical to other unsweet Filipino longganisas, except for the addition of paprika and the dry and fine texture similar to pepperoni.

== See also ==
- Chorizo de Macao
- List of sausages
