= Longganisa de Guinobatan =

Filipino pork sausage

- Alternative names: Guinobatan longganisa, Longaniza de Guinobatan
- Course: Sausage
- Place of origin: Philippines
- Region or state: Bicol Region
- Main ingredients: pork

Longganisa de Guinobatan is a Filipino pork sausage originating from the town of Guinobatan in Albay, Philippines. It is a type of de recado longganisa. Each link is typically only 2 inches (5.1 cm) in length. It is made from lean pork, pork fat, salt, sugar, garlic, saltpeter, and black pepper. Unlike other Philippine sausages, the meat is uniquely chopped by hand. The dish is celebrated in the annual "Longganisa Festival" of Guinobatan.
