= Tuguegarao longganisa =

Filipino pork sausage

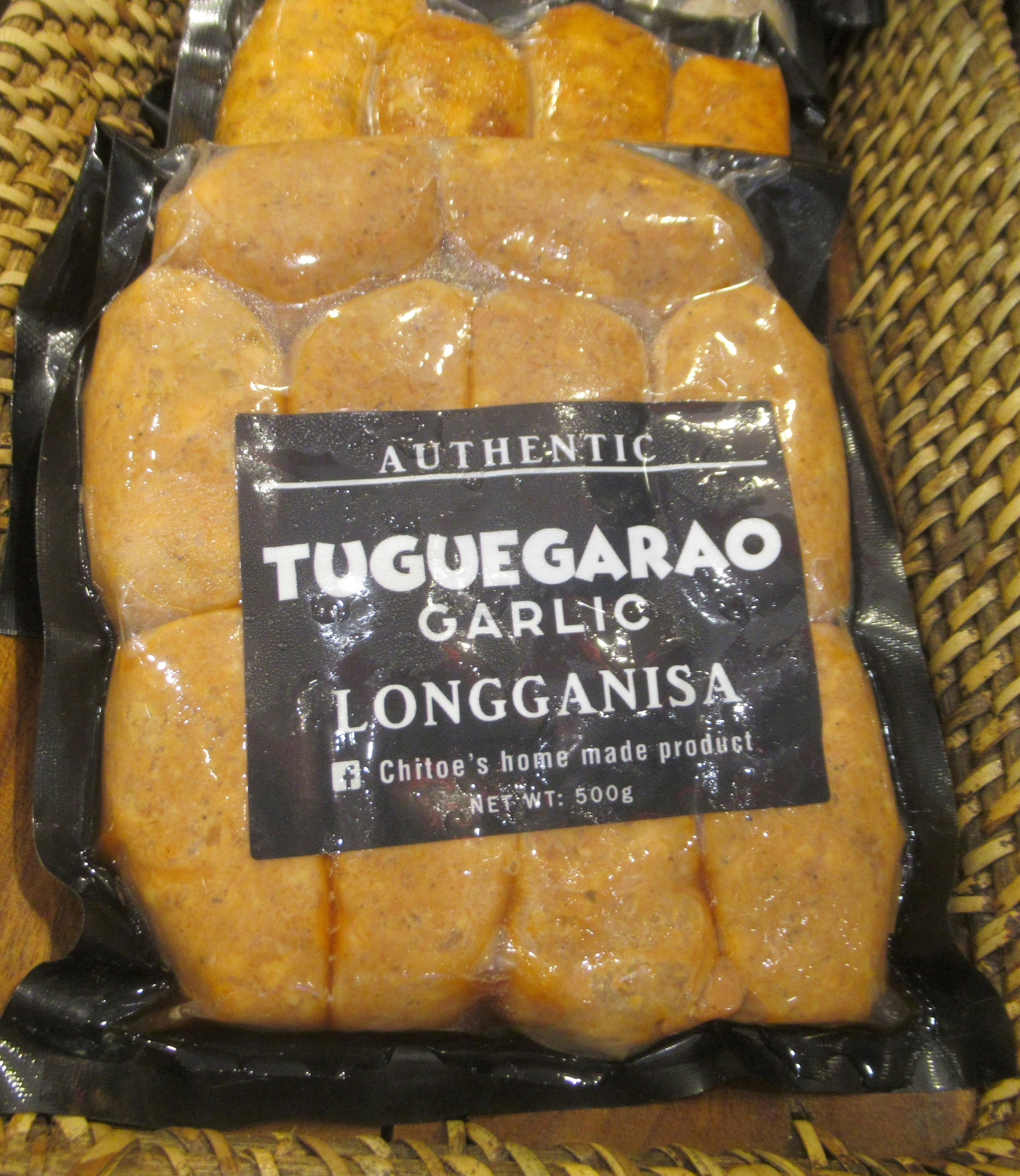
- Alternative names: Ybanag longganisa, Ibanag longganisa
- Course: Sausage
- Place of origin: Philippines
- Region or state: Tuguegarao, Cagayan
- Main ingredients: pork

Tuguegarao longganisa, also known as the Ybanag longganisa, is a Filipino pork sausage originating from the Ybanag people of Tuguegarao City, Cagayan. It is a type of de recado longganisa. It is made with coarsely ground pork, black pepper, garlic, coarse salt, and cane vinegar (ideally sukang iloko) in hog casings. It is typically dyed orange or yellowish with achuete oil.

== See also ==
- List of sausages
