= Pampanga longganisa =

Filipino pork sausage

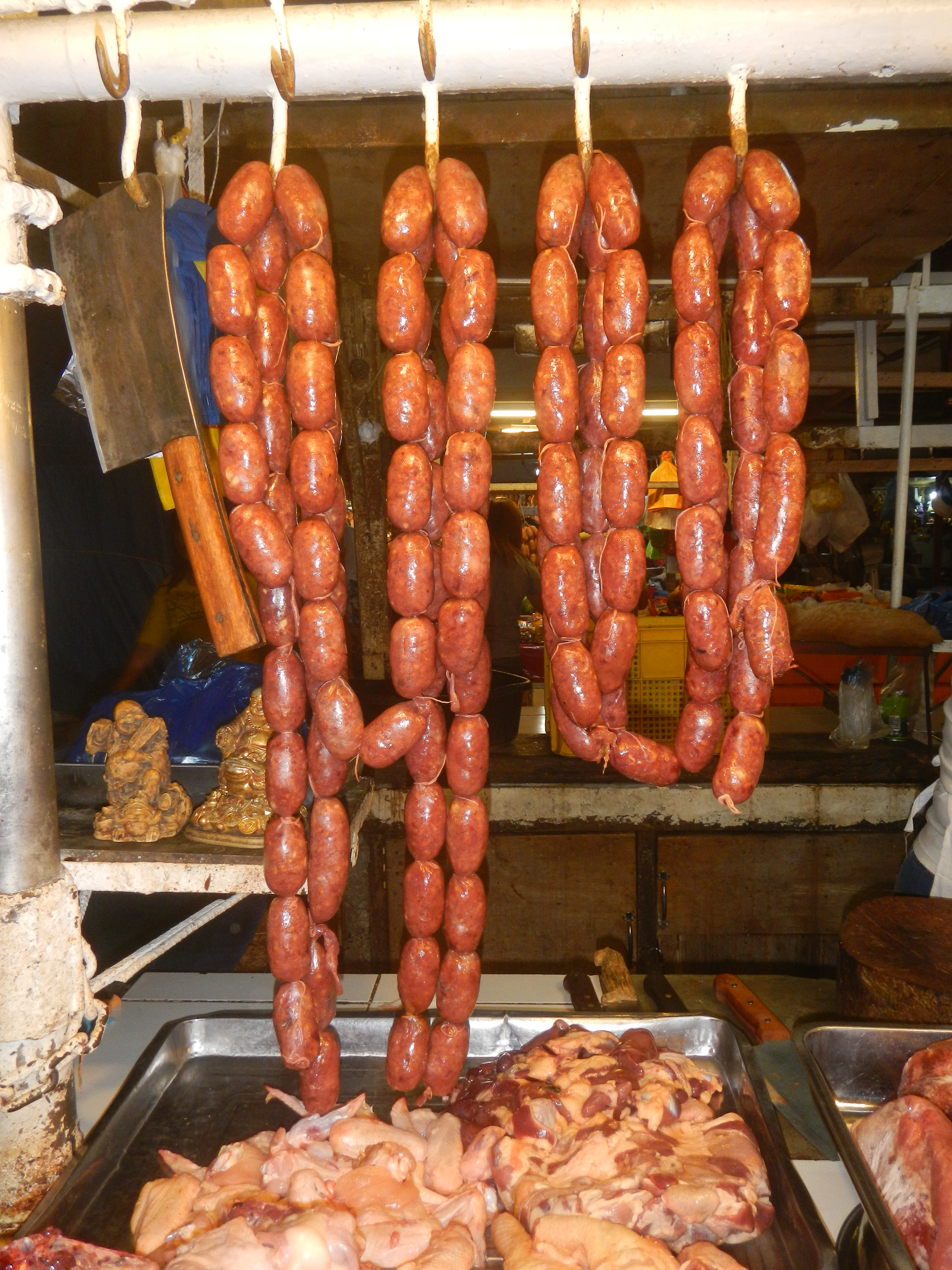
- Course: Sausage
- Place of origin: Philippines
- Region or state: Pampanga
- Main ingredients: pork

Pampanga longganisa is a Filipino pork sausage originating from the province of Pampanga. It is a type of hamonado (sweet) longganisa. It is typically longer and thinner than other Philippine sausages. It is made with pork, garlic, brown sugar, black pepper, coarse salt, and vinegar. It can be prepared with or without the casing. It is typically dyed orange or red with achuete seeds. It is the most common sweet-type longganisa eaten throughout the Philippines, since it is commercially mass-produced.

== See also ==
- Guagua longganisa, a salty and sour longganisa also from Pampanga
