= Longaniza =

Type of sausage originating from Spain

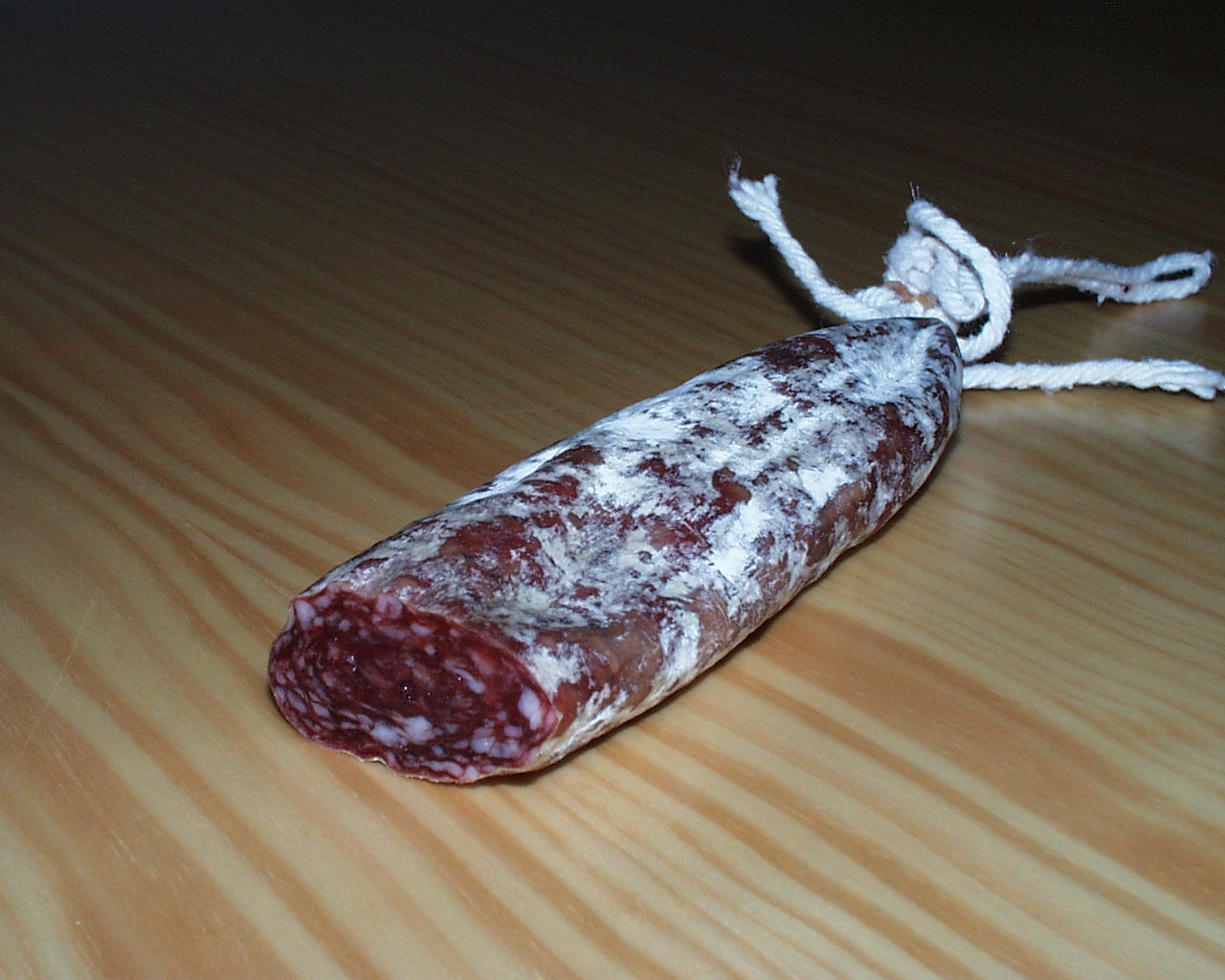
- Llonganissa from Catalonia, Spain
- Type: Sausage
- Place of origin: Spain
- Main ingredients: Pork and seasoning

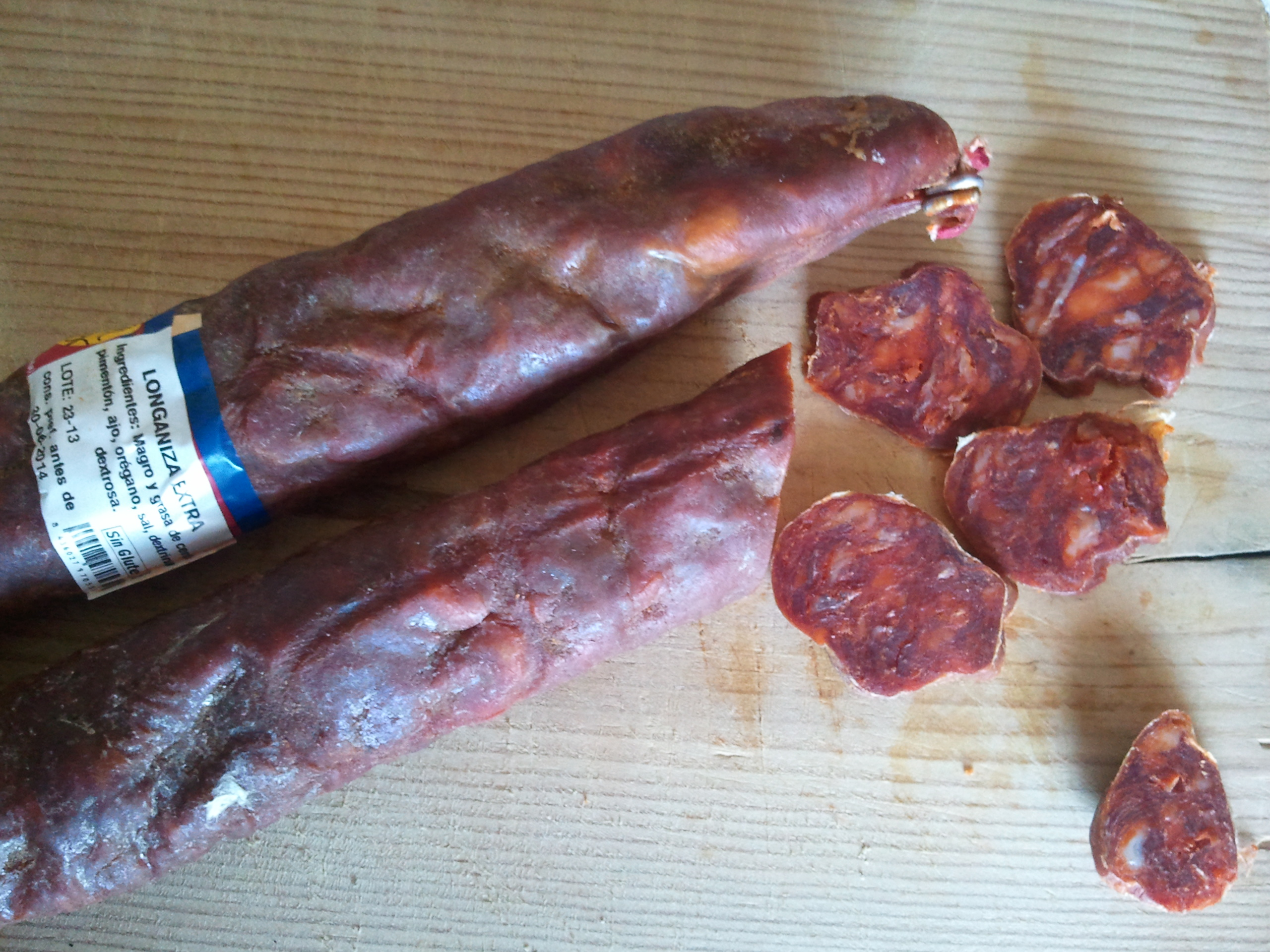
Longaniza from Castile and León, Spain

Longaniza (Spanish pronunciation: [loŋɡaˈniθa], or Latin American Spanish: [loŋɡaˈnisa]) is a type of sausage (embutido) of Spanish origin that is similar to chorizo and closely associated with the Portuguese sausage linguiça. Its defining characteristics vary from region to region. It is popular in the cuisines of Spain, Argentina, Uruguay, Puerto Rico, the Dominican Republic, El Salvador, Guatemala, Mexico and Chile. In the Philippines, it is known as longganisa.

Longaniza derives from lucanica, a sausage from Lucania in Southern Italy that was adopted by the Latins of Ancient Rome through military contact. It later spread to the Iberian Peninsula, and from Spain through colonial expansion to regions influenced by Spanish culture around the world.

== Varieties by country ==
=== Spain ===
In Spain, longaniza is similar to salchichón, though thinner; both differ from chorizo in that black pepper is used for them instead of paprika and may have different spices in them like nutmeg.

=== Argentina and Uruguay ===
In Argentina and Uruguay, longaniza is a very long, cured and dried pork sausage that gets its particular flavour from ground anise seeds. This results in a very particular aroma, and a mildly sweet flavour that contrasts with the strong salty taste of the stuffing. It is used mainly as an appetizer or in sandwiches, and very rarely cooked.

=== Chile and Peru ===
In Chile and Peru, longaniza may be eaten during a barbecue with bread as a choripán. The city of Chillán is known for its longanizas. Chillán's football team Ñublense are nicknamed The Clockwork Longaniza (Spanish: La longaniza mecánica). During the festivities of the 18th of September, longaniza is prepared in great quantities.

=== Mexico ===
Mexican longaniza tends to be longer than Mexican chorizo and is spicier. It is commonly chopped up and mixed with eggs with tomato and chili to make the dish longaniza con huevo, and is eaten with tortillas in the morning.

=== Puerto Rico (U.S.) ===
Puerto Rican style longaniza is made of pork, but also is made with chicken or turkey. The red orange color is from the addition of annatto seeds. Rice with longaniza is a popular dish.

=== Dominican Republic ===
Since colonial times, Dominican style longaniza has been prepared with the juice of bitter oranges (or lime), garlic, oregano and salt. For the casing, pork intestines are used. Then the longaniza is left to cure in the sun for some days. It is eaten fried in its own fat or in vegetable oil. Quality varies considerably because it is generally home-made. Best quality Dominican longaniza usually has a 70% ratio of lean to fat.

=== Philippines ===
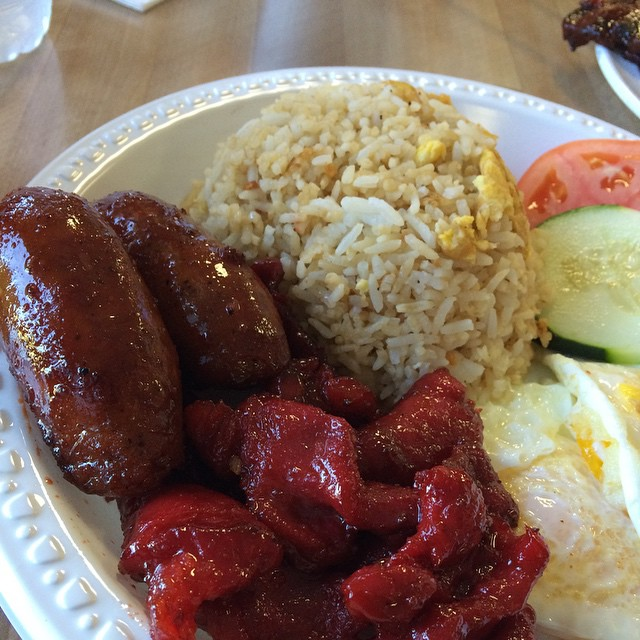
Philippine longganisa are traditionally eaten during breakfast, along with sinangag (garlic fried rice). Also pictured: fried egg and tocino.

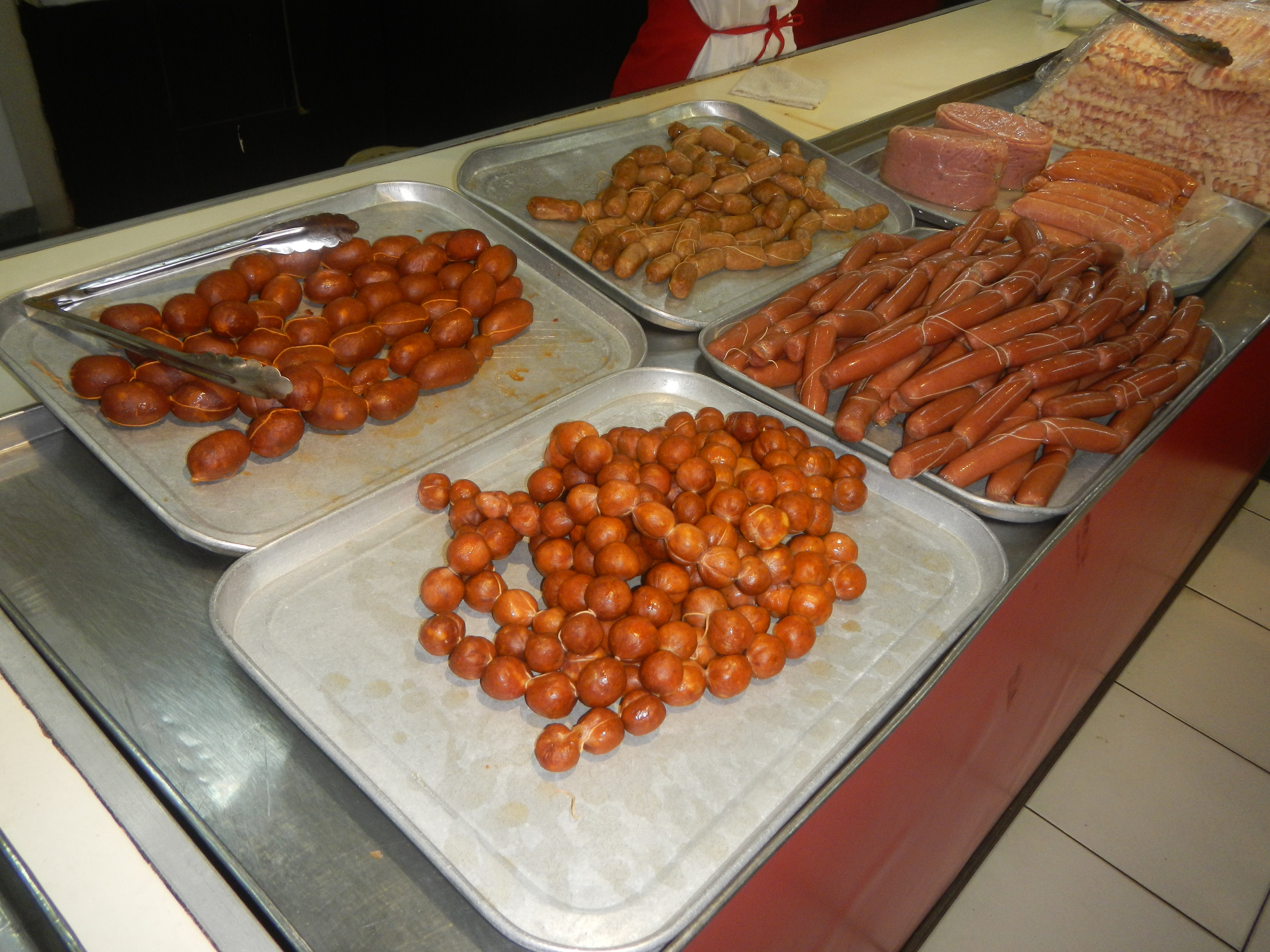
Various types of Philippine longganisas in Quiapo, Manila

Longaniza or longganisa (also called chorizo, choriso, tsoriso, or soriso in Visayan regions) refers to sausages flavoured with spices. They are commonly dyed red, yellow, or orange with achuete seeds.

Longganisa are usually fresh or smoked sausages, typically made with varying ratios of lean meat and fat, along with garlic, black pepper, salt (usually coarse sea salt), saltpeter, muscovado or brown sugar, and vinegar. Variants may add paprika, chili, anise liqueur, and other spices. Most longganisa are classified primarily by either being sweet (jamonado or hamonado; Philippine Spanish: longaniza jamonada) or garlicky (de recado or derecado; Philippine Spanish: longaniza de recado, "spice-mixed longganisa" or literally "longanissa laden with a set of spices"). Most longganisa are made with pork. Unlike the Spanish chorizo and longaniza, Filipino longganisa can also be made with chicken, beef, or even tuna. Commercial varieties are made into links, but homemade sausages may be simple patties (bulk sausages) without the casing, known as longganisang hubad or in Philippine English as "skinless sausages".

There are numerous kinds of sausages in the Philippines, usually unique to a specific region like Vigan longganisa, Alaminos longganisa, and Chorizo de Cebu. There are also a few dry sausages like Chorizo de Bilbao and Chorizo de Macao. The most widely known longganisa variant in Philippine cuisine is the Pampanga longganisa, because it is commercially mass-produced.

Below are some of the more known variants of longganisa in the Philippines (along with their regions of origin, where applicable):

- Alaminos longganisa – pork longganisa de recado from Pangasinan
- Cabanatuan longganisa (or Batutay) – beef longganisa from Nueva Ecija, with sweet and garlicky variants and can be made without a casing ("skinless")
- Calumpit longganisa (or Longganisang Bawang) (Bulacan)
- Chorizo de Bilbao – dry pork longganisa characterized by the use of paprika
- Chorizo de Cebu (or Longganisa de Cebu) – pork longganisa hamonada from Cebu
- Chorizo de Macao – dry pork longganisa characterized by the use of anise liqueur
- Chorizo Negrense (or Bacolod Longganisa) – pork longganisa from Negros Island
- Longaniza de Guinobatan – pork longganisa de recado from Guinobatan, Albay
- Lucban longganisa – pork longganisa de recado from Quezon characterized by the use of oregano
- Pampanga longganisa – pork longganisa hamonada from Pampanga
- Pinuneg – pork blood sausage from the Cordillera Administrative Region
- Tuguegarao longganisa (or Longganisang Ybanag) – pork longganisa de recado from Cagayan Valley
- Vigan longganisa – pork longganisa de recado from the Ilocos Region
- Imus Langgonisa - famous savory, heavily garlicky, and slightly sour pork sausage from Imus City, Cavite.

== See also ==
- List of sausages
