= Cantimpalos =

- Municipality
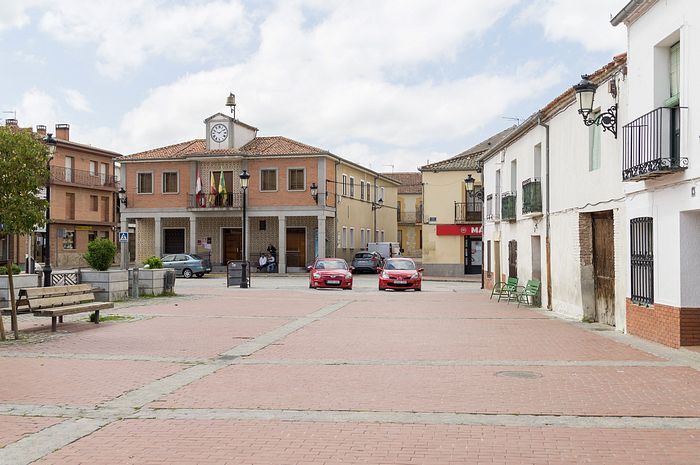
- Cantimpalos Town Hall

- Flag Coat of arms

- Location in Spain. Cantimpalos (Spain)
- Coordinates: 41°04′26″N 4°09′32″W
- Country: Spain
- Autonomous community: Castile and León
- Province: Segovia
- Municipality: Cantimpalos

Area
  - Total: 26.29 km^{2} (10.15 sq mi)
- Elevation: 912 m (2,992 ft)

Population (2025-01-01)
  - Total: 1,533
  - Density: 58.31/km^{2} (151.0/sq mi)
- Time zone: UTC+1 (CET)
  - Summer (DST): UTC+2 (CEST)
- Website: Official website

Cantimpalos is a municipality located in the province of Segovia, Castile and León, Spain. According to the 2024 census (INE), the municipality had a population of 1,427 inhabitants.

Historical population
Year	1991	1996	2001	2004	2007
Pop.	1,332	1,306	1,284	1,296	1,401
±%	—	−2.0%	−1.7%	+0.9%	+8.1%

== See also ==
- Chorizo de Cantimpalos
