= Alaminos longganisa =

Filipino pork sausage

- Alternative names: Alaminos longaniza, longganisa Pangasinan
- Course: Sausage
- Place of origin: Philippines
- Region or state: Alaminos, Pangasinan
- Main ingredients: pork

Alaminos longganisa, also known as longganisa Pangasinan, is a Filipino pork sausage originating from Alaminos, Pangasinan. It is a type of de recado longganisa.

It is made with ground lean pork, ground pork fat, brown sugar, coarse salt, saltpeter, black pepper, bay leaf, vinegar, and garlic in hog casings. It has a slightly sour, garlicky taste, is typically bright yellow or orange due to the use of achuete seeds, and is made in bite-sized pieces. It is a popular pasalubong.

== Background ==
The longganisa is named after the Spanish “longaniza,” and is sometimes used interchangeably with the chorizo. The longganisa is a type of local sausage with two major types—the recado, with a more savory flavor, and the hamonado, with a sweet taste.

Unlike other longganisa variants, the Alaminos longganisa's segments of the sausage are uniquely divided by small pieces of coconut leaf midribs (sometimes mistaken for toothpicks), making it easily identifiable. Each sausage string usually has six segments and is traditionally tied at the end with a length of buli palm fiber. The sausages are celebrated in an annual "Longganisa Festival" in Alaminos.

== See also ==
- List of sausages
