= Chorizo de Pamplona =

Type of Spanish sausage

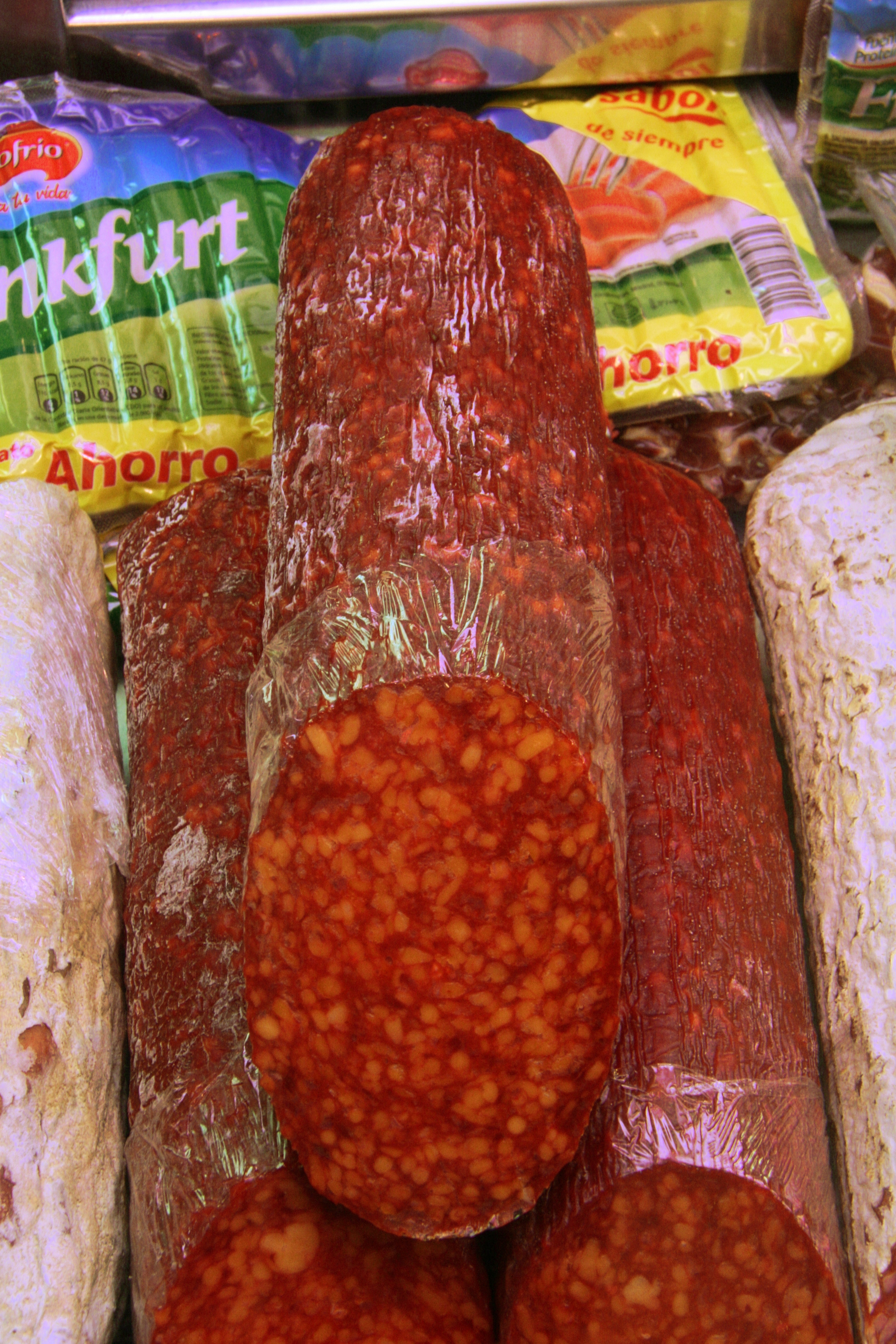
Chorizo de Pamplona

Chorizo de Pamplona is a sausage that is typical in the cuisine of the Navarre region of Spain. It is prepared with equal parts of finely chopped beef and pork and significant amounts of a strong smoked paprika, pork fat and a natural or plastic casing which is designated to have a minimum size of forty millimeters in diameter. The red-orange coloration is due to the addition of paprika, which is abundant in Navarre. It differs from most other chorizos due to its thickness and more finely ground meat. Despite its local name, it is a very common type of sausage in delicatessens around the Spanish territory. It is also produced and sold in Pamplona, Spain.

== Characteristics ==
Chorizo de Pamplona is a fermented, cured and dried sausage, and its texture is typically dry. It has been described as having similar qualities to that of pepperoni sausage. Its flavor has been described as tangy, salty, and as having a slight bitterness derived from the pimentón (Spanish smoked paprika) used in its preparation.

== See also ==
- List of sausages
- Spanish cuisine
