= Chorizo Negrense =

Filipino smoked pork sausage

Chorizo negrense
- Alternative names: Bacolod longganisa, Chorizo de Bacolod, Bacolod chorizo, Negrense chorizo
- Course: Sausage
- Place of origin: Philippines
- Region or state: Bacolod, Negros
- Main ingredients: pork

Chorizo negrense, also known as chorizo de Bacólod, is a Filipino smoked pork sausage originating from Bacolod, Negros. It comes in two flavors: hamonado (sweet) and recado (garlicky). It can be prepared smoked in a casing (known as tsorisong bilog), or prepared fresh without the casing (known as tsorisong pudpod). It is made with ground pork, vinegar, garlic, calamansi, soy sauce, black pepper, and coarse salt. Sugar is added to the hamonado version.

== See also ==
- Chorizo de Cebu
- List of sausages
