= Tabanera la Luenga =

- Municipality
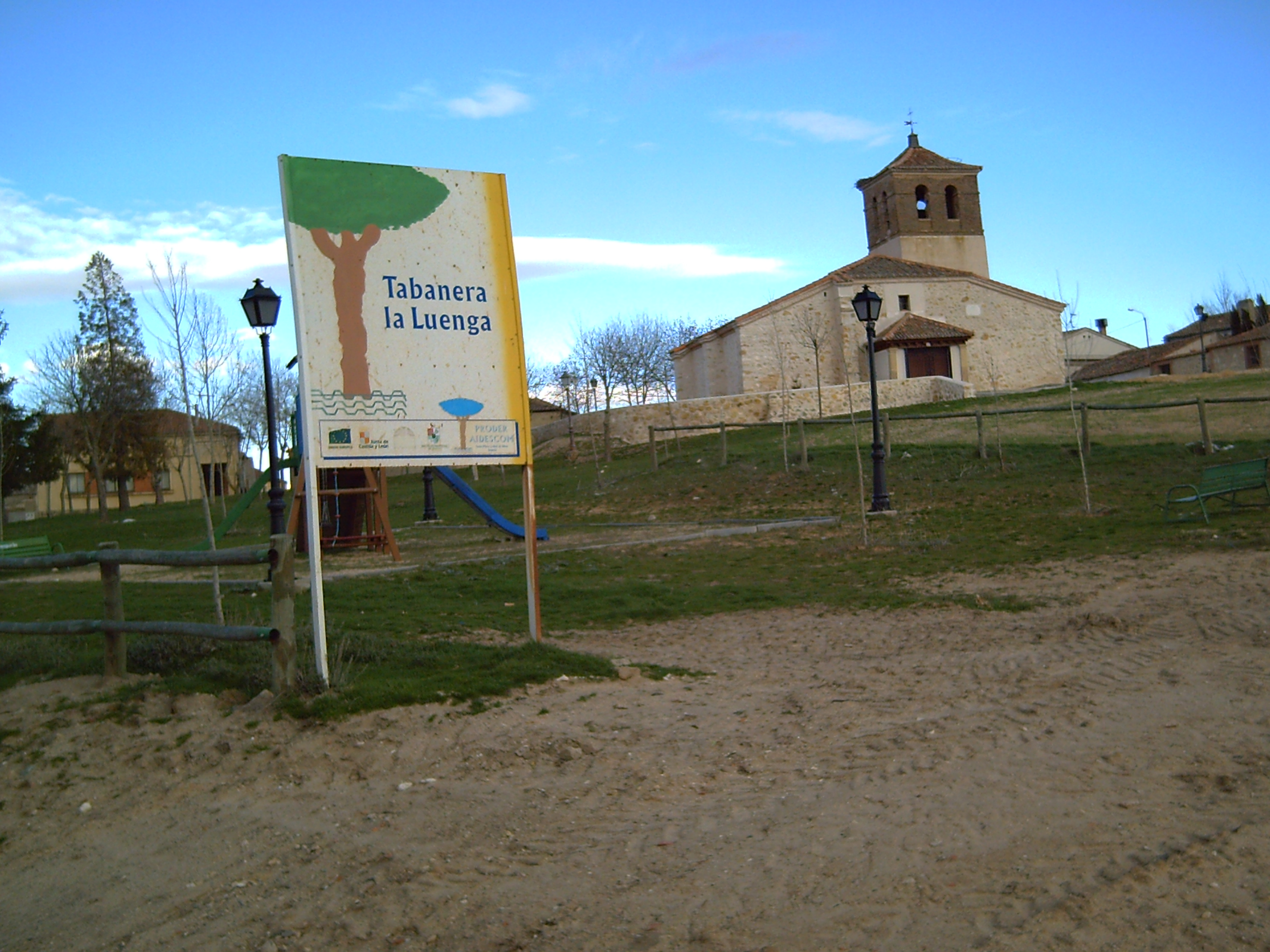

- Location in Spain. Tabanera la Luenga (Spain)
- Coordinates: 41°05′49″N 4°14′22″W
- Country: Spain
- Autonomous community: Castile and León
- Province: Segovia
- Municipality: Tabanera la Luenga

Area
  - Total: 12.88 km^{2} (4.97 sq mi)

Population (2025-01-01)
  - Total: 51
  - Density: 4.0/km^{2} (10/sq mi)
- Time zone: UTC+1 (CET)
  - Summer (DST): UTC+2 (CEST)
- Website: Official website

Tabanera la Luenga is a municipality located in the province of Segovia, Castile and León, Spain. According to the 2004 census (INE), the municipality had a population of 72 inhabitants.
