= Bernuy de Porreros =

- Municipality
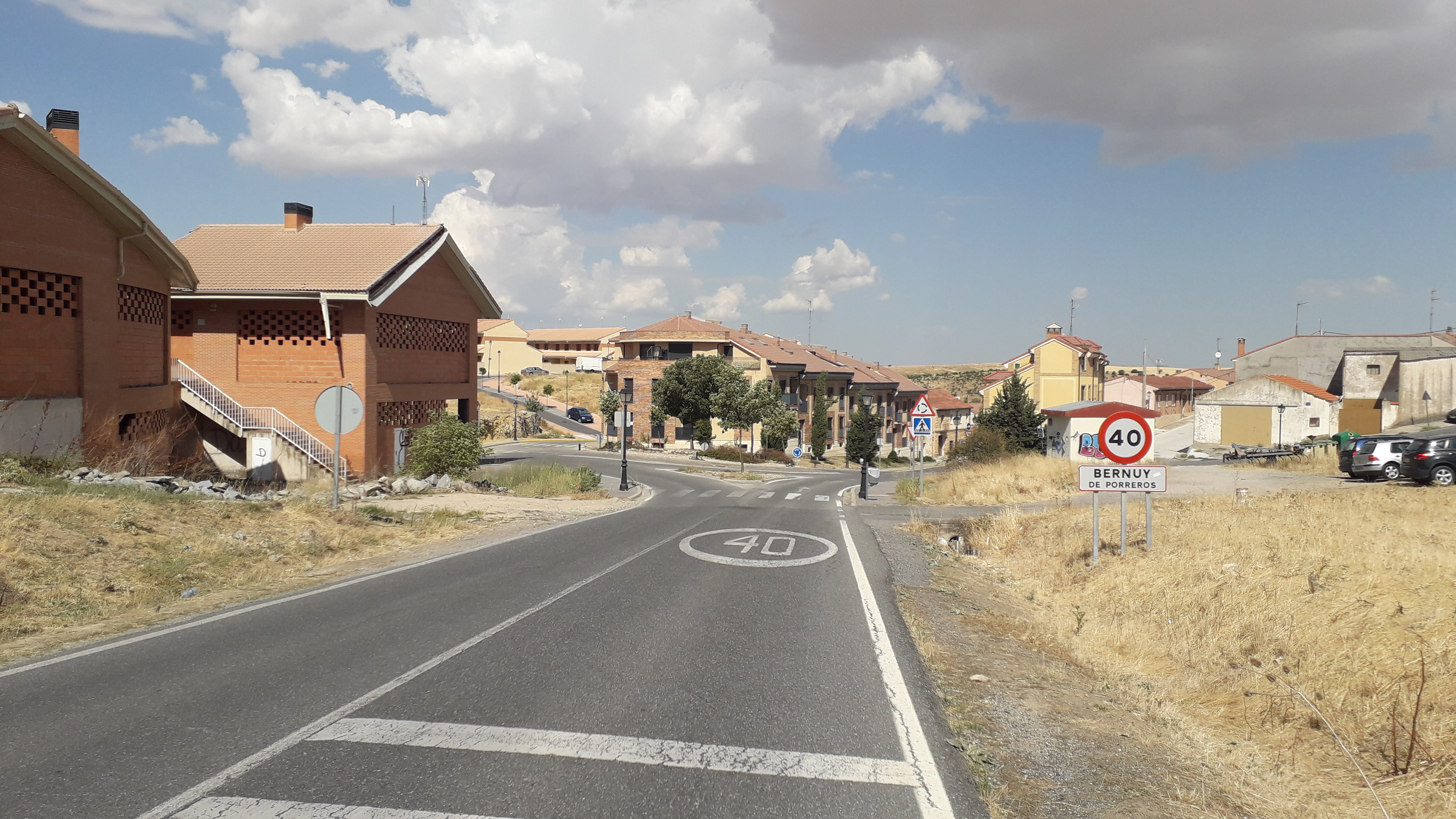
- El Choricero rural house, in Bernuy de Porreros, Segovia, Spain

- Flag Coat of arms

- Location in Spain. Bernuy de Porreros (Spain)
- Coordinates: 40°59′59″N 4°07′00″W
- Country: Spain
- Autonomous community: Castile and León
- Province: Segovia
- Municipality: Bernuy de Porreros

Area
  - Total: 9.27 km^{2} (3.58 sq mi)
- Elevation: 1,014 m (3,327 ft)

Population (2025-01-01)
  - Total: 1,342
  - Density: 145/km^{2} (375/sq mi)
- Time zone: UTC+1 (CET)
  - Summer (DST): UTC+2 (CEST)
- Website: Official website

Bernuy de Porreros is a municipality located in the province of Segovia, Castile and León, Spain. According to the 2021 census (INE), the municipality had a population of 788 inhabitants.
