= La Losa =

- Municipality
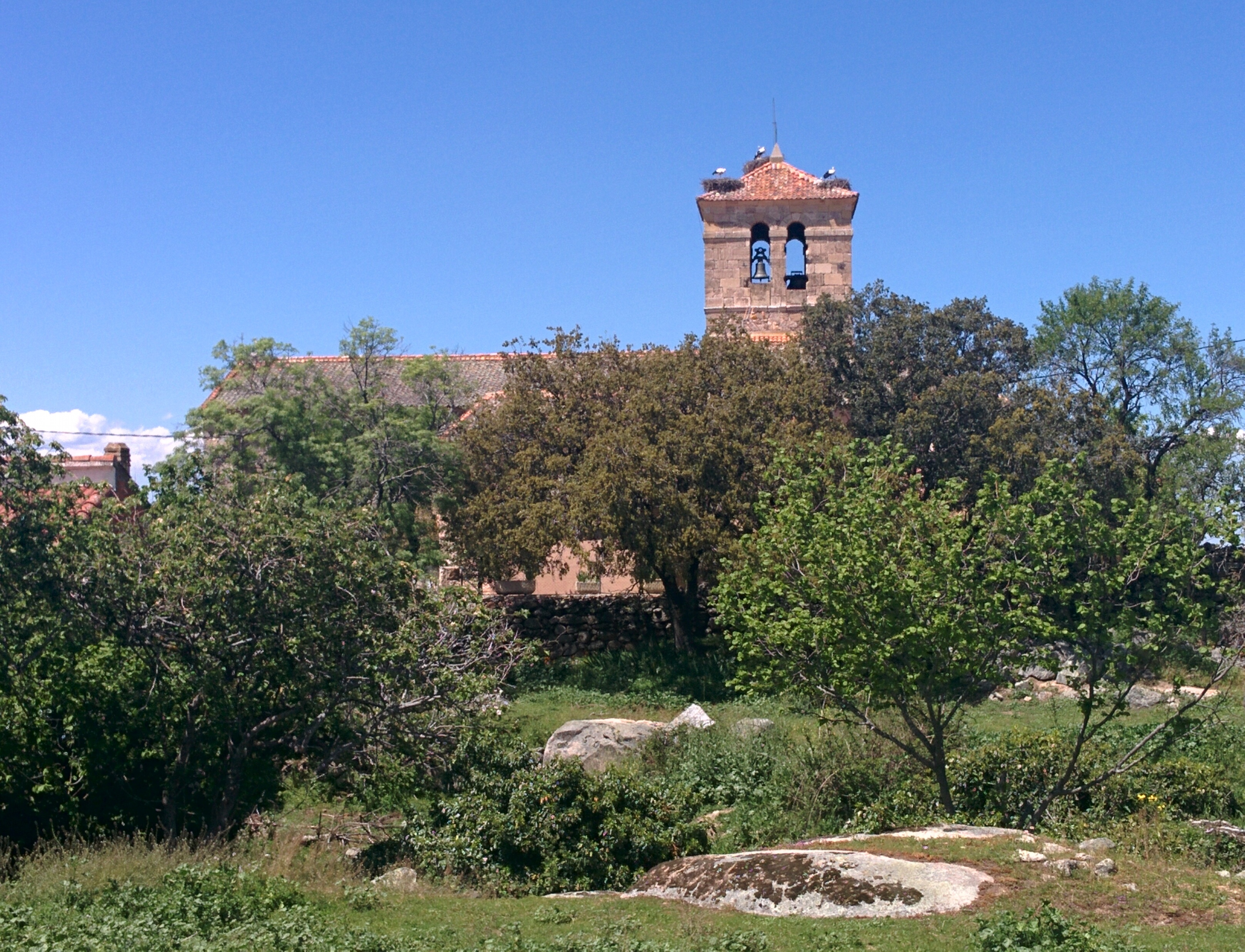

- Location in Spain. La Losa (Spain)
- Coordinates: 40°51′16″N 4°09′47″W
- Country: Spain
- Autonomous community: Castile and León
- Province: Segovia
- Municipality: La Losa

Area
  - Total: 28 km^{2} (11 sq mi)

Population (2025-01-01)
  - Total: 543
  - Density: 19/km^{2} (50/sq mi)
- Time zone: UTC+1 (CET)
  - Summer (DST): UTC+2 (CEST)
- Website: Official website

La Losa is a municipality located in the province of Segovia, Castile and León, Spain. According to the 2004 census (INE), the municipality has a population of 445 inhabitants. La Losa is a small town that has a bakery, a small shop, a small doctor and pharmacy, along with a summer school and public library.
