= Cabanatuan longganisa =

Filipino beef sausage

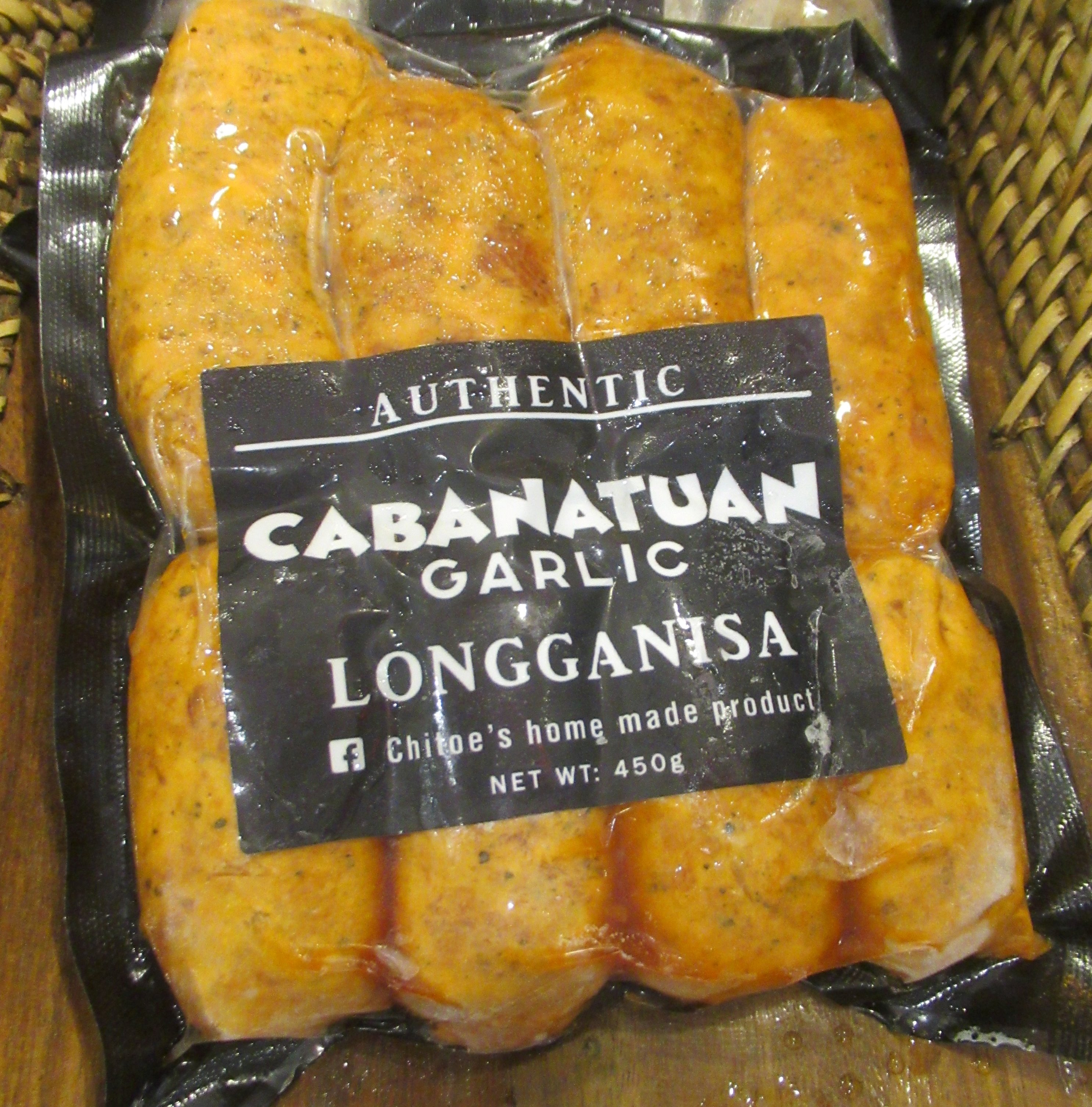
- Alternative names: Batutay
- Course: Sausage
- Place of origin: Philippines
- Region or state: Cabanatuan, Nueva Ecija
- Main ingredients: beef

Cabanatuan longganisa, also known as batutay, bototay, or batotay, depending on the municipality, is a Filipino beef sausage originating from Cabanatuan in the province of Nueva Ecija. It can be served with sweet sauce (hamonado), garlicky (de recado), or "skinless" (without the casing). It is celebrated in the annual "Longganisa Festival" of Cabanatuan.

On February 5, 2005 "Longganisa Festival", Cabanatuan prepared a 3.3-kilometer string of longganisa from the Lazaro Francisco Memorial Central School to Burgos Avenue and Gabaldon street intersection. 10 meat vendors roasted for three hours 2,560 kilograms of meat costing P371,000. It surpassed the 2.2-kilometer longganisa of Laoag in 2001.

== See also ==
- Chicken longganisa
- Fish longganisa
- List of sausages
