= Anisette =

Anise-flavored liqueur

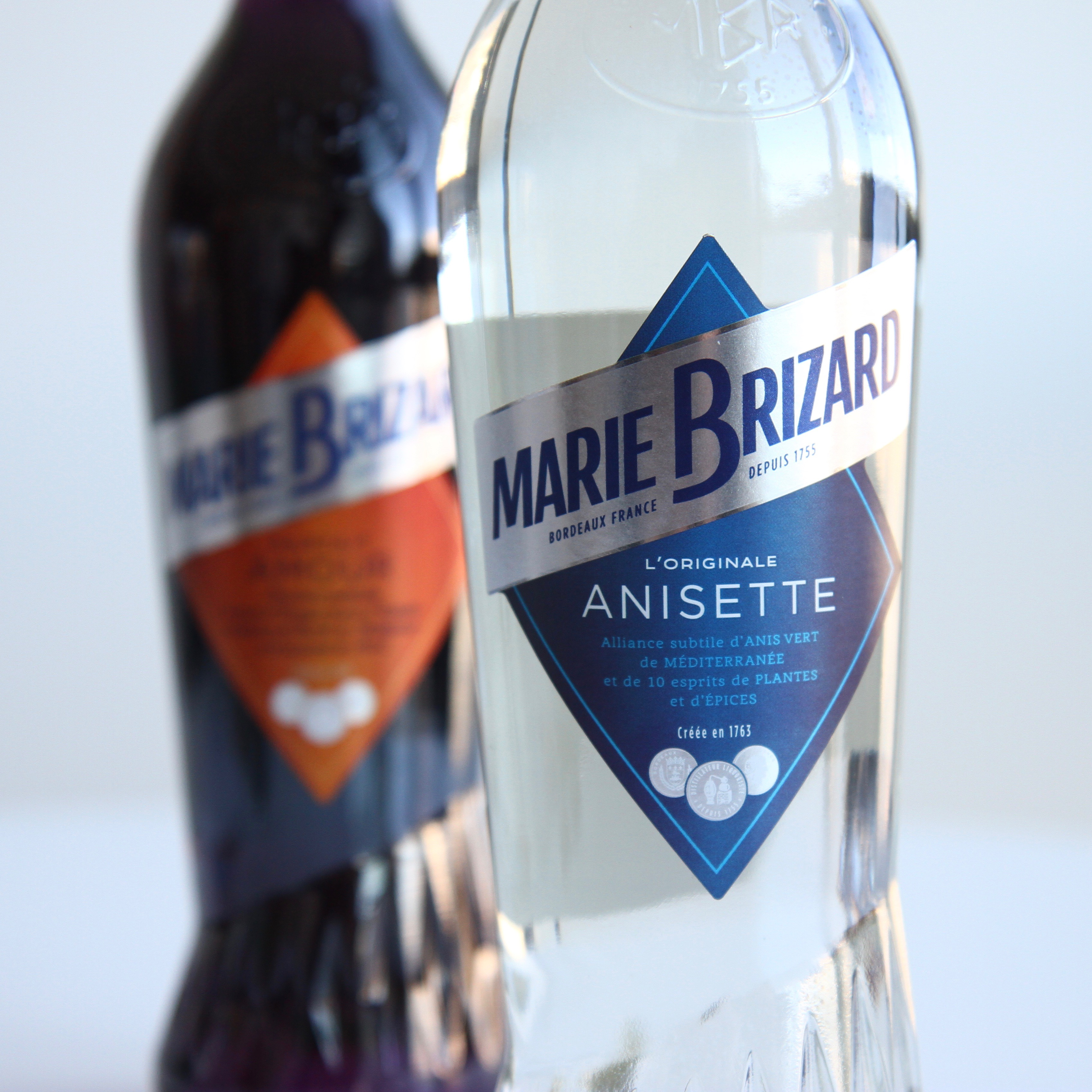
Marie Brizard brand anisette

Anisette, or Anis, is a liqueur with an anise flavor profile; it is commonly consumed in Mediterranean countries. Anisette is colorless. Due to its sugar content, it is sweeter than dry anise flavored spirits (for example, absinthe). The most traditional style of anisette is created through the distillation of aniseed; this sort of anisette is differentiated from those produced by simple maceration by the inclusion of the word distilled on the label.

Anisette has a very strong flavor; as such, it is often served mixed with water or poured over ice cubes.

== Variations ==
Pastis is a similar-tasting liqueur that is prepared in similar fashion and sometimes confused with anisette. It employs a combination of both aniseed and licorice root extracts. Sambuca is essentially an anisette of Italian origin that requires a high minimum (350g/L) sugar content.

== Geographical spread ==
=== Mediterranean ===
Anise spirits of the Mediterranean region

In the Mediterranean Basin, anise-based or liquorice-based spirits include:

- Spain: Anís del Mono ("the monkey's anisette") has been produced since 1870. The label, with a monkey holding a scroll and a bottle, was designed by Ramon Casas i Carbó. It is the anisette of choice in Malcolm Lowry's Under the Volcano. Characters in Ernest Hemingway's novel The Sun Also Rises and his short story "Hills Like White Elephants" drink and discuss Anís del Toro – "Bull's Anisette." Another type, Aguardiente de Ojén (es), gained fame abroad and is popular in New Orleans, Louisiana, especially during the Mardi Gras festivities.
- France: Anisette, made by Marie Brizard since 1755 and Pastis, made by Paul Ricard since 1932
- Greece: Ouzo
- Malta: Anisetta (Żambur), made with anise and herbs.
- Italy: Sambuca
- Portugal: Licor Aniz Escarchado (crystallized)
- Turkey, Azerbaijan, Armenia, and Albania: Rakı
- Lebanon, Syria, Palestine, Israel, Jordan, and Egypt: Arak
- Algeria: Anisette Cristal

=== Latin America ===
Anise-flavoured alcohols from other parts of the world include Aguardiente from Colombia and Mexico.

=== Philippines ===
Anise liqueur was also introduced to the Philippines by the Spanish, which developed into the local anisado, an anise-flavored liqueur usually made from distilled sugarcane wine. A notable variant of Filipino anisado with sugar is known as anisado Mallorca, or simply Mallorca. They are commonly used as ingredients in Filipino cuisine.
