= Atlantic diet =

Traditional eating habits of people in Galicia and Portugal

The Atlantic diet refers the traditional eating habits of people in Portugal, with a particular emphasis on the north, and Galicia, in Northwestern Spain; which focuses on unprocessed foods, vegetables and fruits, nuts, whole grain bread, fish, dairy, eggs, olive oil and some red meat and wine. As both emphasize avoiding processed foods, the Atlantic diet is similar to the Mediterranean diet. The Atlantic diet involves more fish, milk, potatoes, bread, red meat and pork, while the Mediterranean diet has more pasta, beans and seeds, and greater emphasis on fat from extra-virgin olive oil rather than fatty fish like mackerel, sardines and salmon.

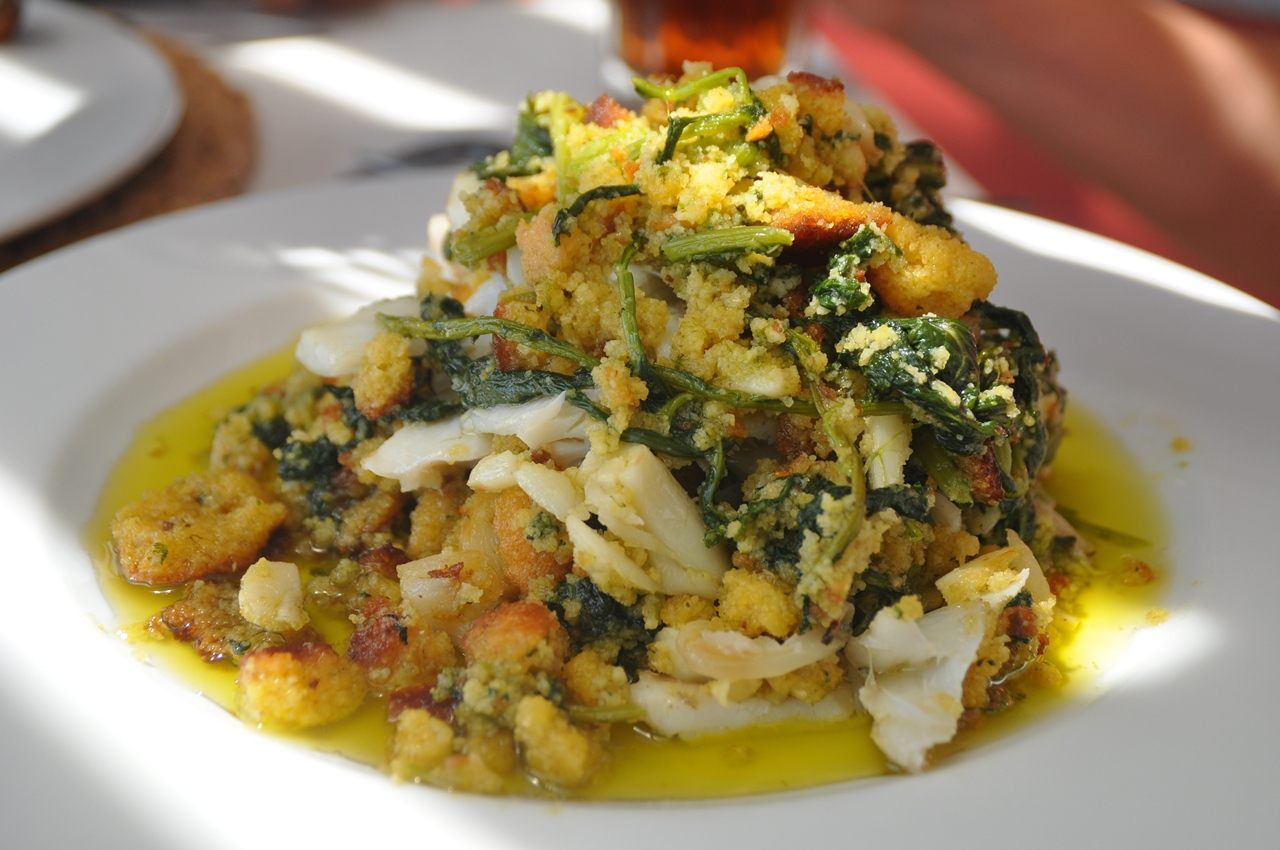
Portuguese Rapini codfish

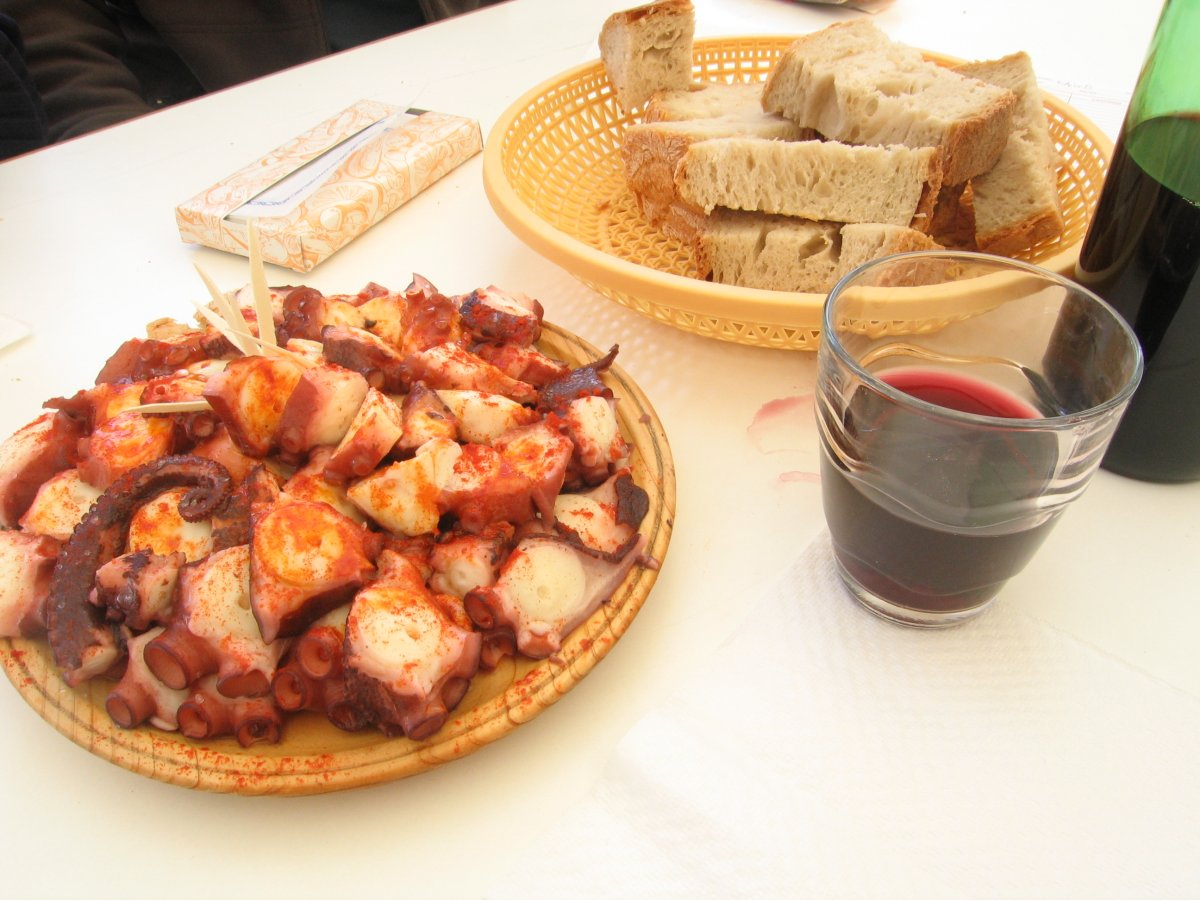
Polbo á feira with bread and wine

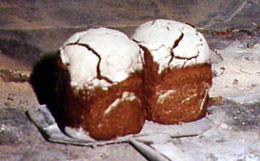
Portuguese traditional broa

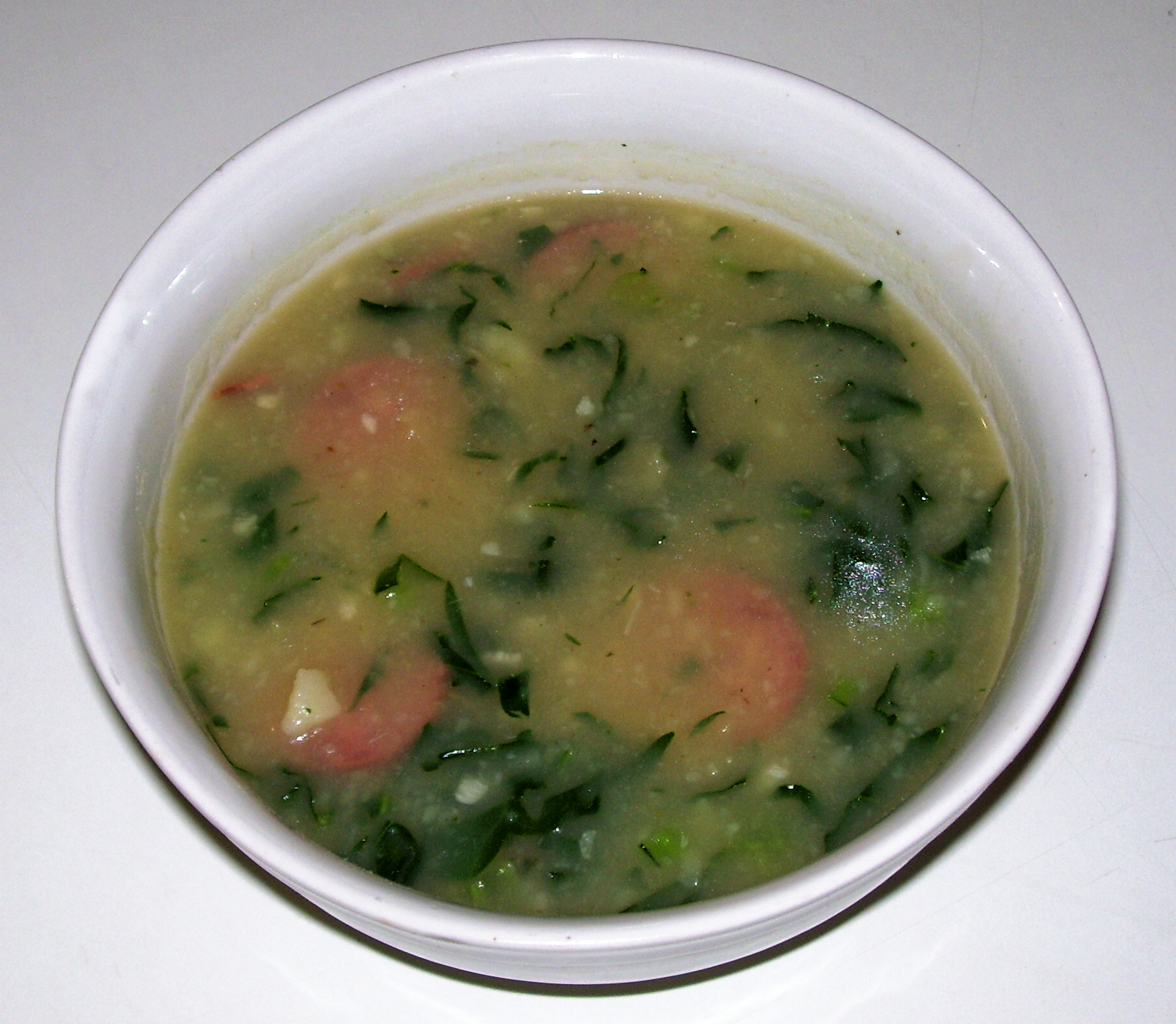
Caldo verde One of the most popular Portuguese broths

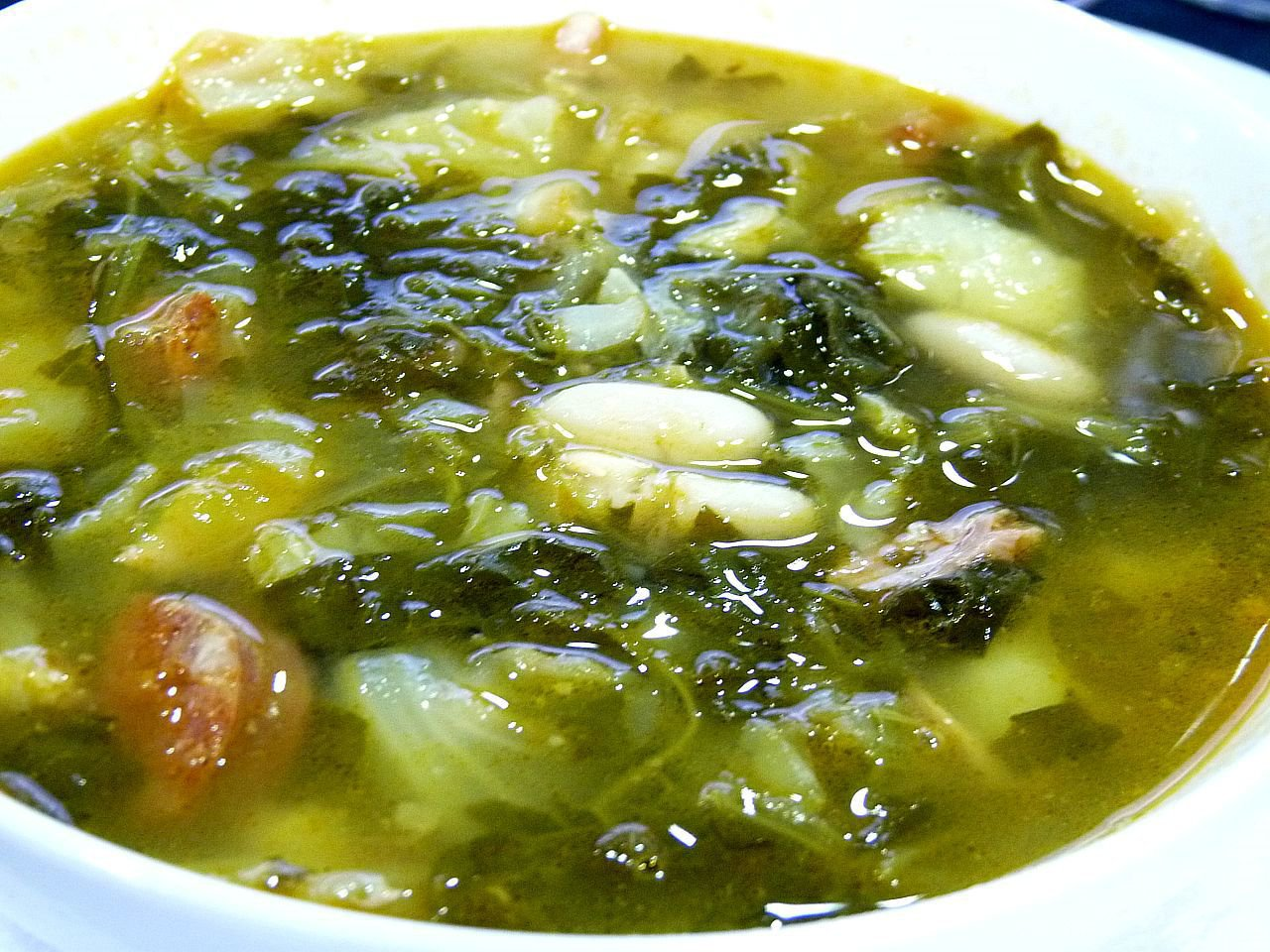
Caldo galego

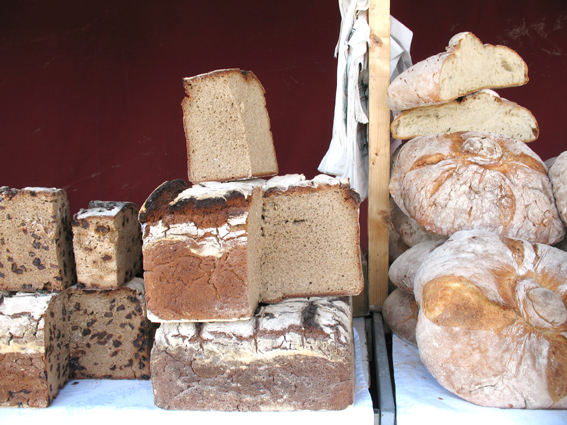
Galician bread

== In Spain ==
Sometimes known in Spain as 'Galician Atlantic diet' due to its origins in the region of Galicia, it is “more than a diet, it is a lifestyle where exercise, simple cooking techniques, respect for traditions, and pleasure of eating accompanied are constants.”

== In Portugal and Lusophone communities ==
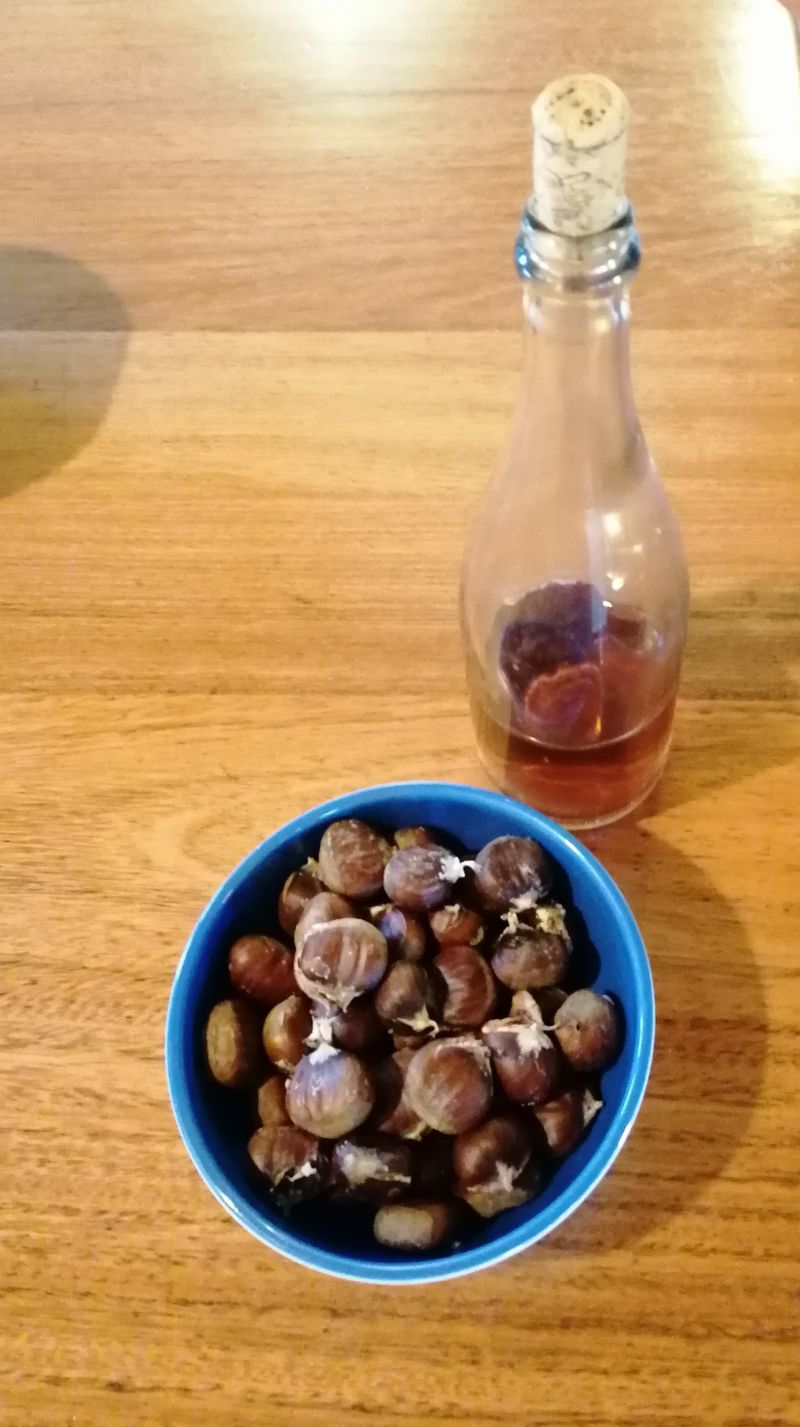
Magusto: chestnuts and jeropiga

With a variety of regional nuances, and more marked in the North, the Atlantic diet is an integral part of Portugal's traditional cuisine. Some of this culinary heritage has been spread worldwide in locations with significant Portuguese-descended communities. Caldo verde with broa is one of the most famous dishes in Portugal.

Before the introduction of potatoes, chestnuts were also one of the main ingredients in staple diets- there has been an urban revival of castanha consumption as part of healthy eating over the past decades.

Traditionally associated with the Autumn, roasted chestnuts; together with new wines like água-pé and jeropiga, were the main attractions during the annual Magusto (castañada) on All Saints Day, St Martin's Day, and St Simon's Day.

The Atlantic diet focuses on natural, local, seasonal and limited consumption of processed foods. It includes fresh fruits, vegetables and legumes (brassica cabbage family), wholegrains, nuts, and a variety of fish and seafood found along the Atlantic ocean.

== In Atlantic Europe ==
Specific to the Iberian Atlantic coast, the Atlantic diet, also known as SEAD (Southern European Atlantic Diet) is part of a broader dietary pattern associated with the countries in Western Europe that border the Atlantic Ocean: Ireland, Scotland, Wales, southern England, Isle of Man, French Brittany. These ramifications further share some commonality with the Nordic diet, of Northern Europe. In both SEAD and Nordic diets, the consumption of fish such as Atlantic cod, common ling, and shellfish such as scallops, is higher than in the Mediterranean diet, and in both regions the consumption of seaweed has been gaining renewed interest. Also, both the SEAD and Nordic diets emphasize sustainable and seasonal foods.

== Diet ==
The Atlantic diet includes high consumption of fish, mollusks, crustaceans, vegetables, potatoes, bread, cereals, fruits, chestnuts, legumes, honey, whole nuts, and olive oil. The Atlantic diet allows for medium consumption of wine, milk, cheese, eggs, pork, and beef. In general, fatty meats, sweets, and soft drinks are consumed in small quantity or not at all.

== Health effects ==
A JAMA study found that six months on the Atlantic diet resulted in a significantly decreased risk of developing metabolic syndrome, which can include obesity, high blood pressure, high blood sugar, triglyceride or cholesterol levels, and lead to the development of cardiovascular disease and type 2 diabetes. A study published in Molecular Psychiatry found that the Atlantic diet (SEAD), lowered depression risk. A study in the European Journal of Preventive Cardiology found that the Southern European Atlantic Diet lowered all-cause, cardiovascular and cancer death. Another study suggests that the Atlantic diet may contribute to the very low coronary mortality registered in Portugal and Galicia, helping to shed light on a long-standing scientific issue relating to the incidence of Acute Myocardial Infarction (AMI).
