= Navarrevisca =

- municipality
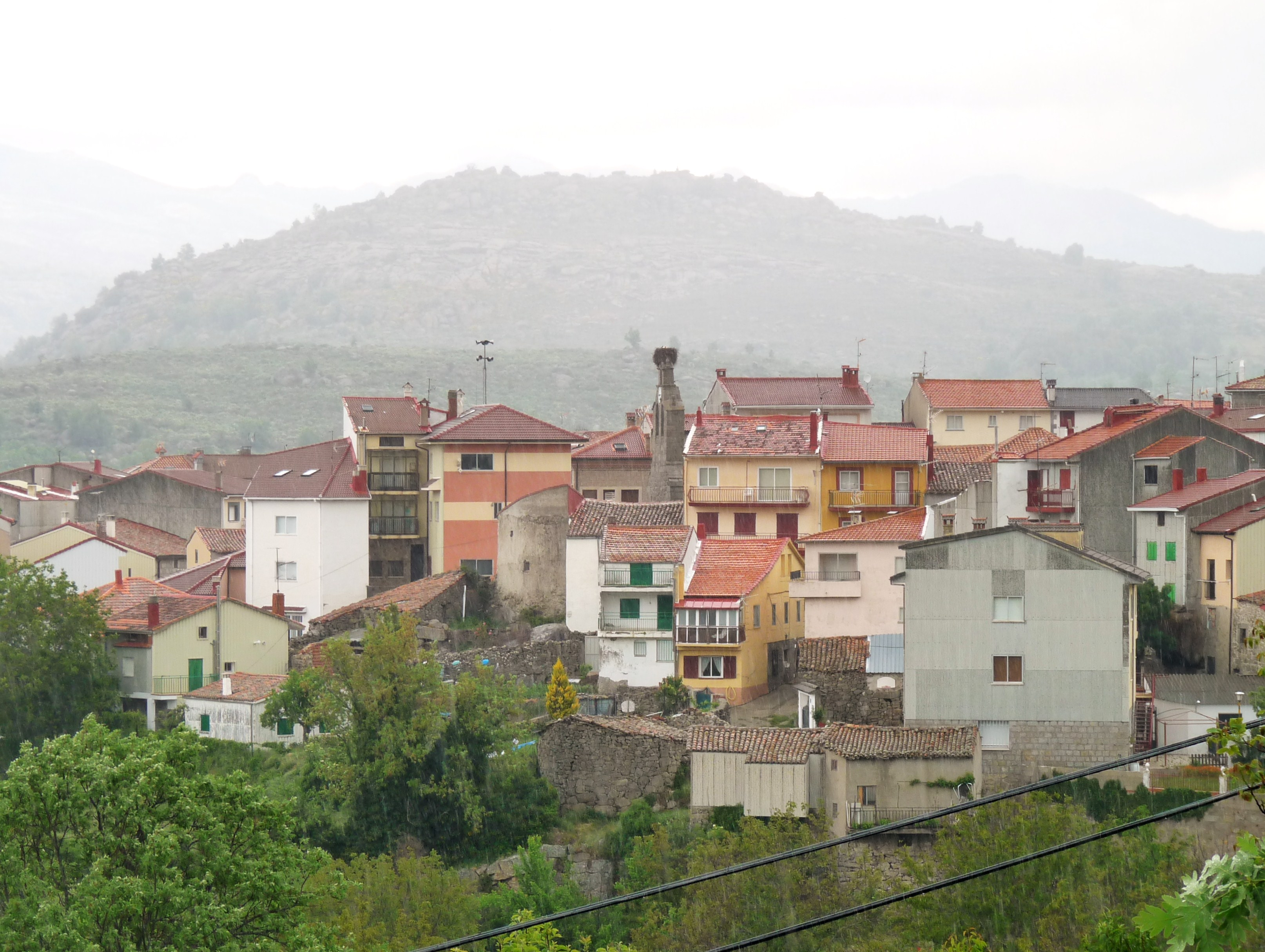

- Coat of arms

- Location in Spain. Navarrevisca (Spain)
- Coordinates: 40°21′51″N 4°53′42″W
- Country: Spain
- Autonomous community: Castile and León
- Province: Ávila
- Municipality: Navarrevisca

Area
  - Total: 39 km^{2} (15 sq mi)
- Elevation: 1,129 m (3,704 ft)

Population (2025-01-01)
  - Total: 281
  - Density: 7.2/km^{2} (19/sq mi)
- Time zone: UTC+1 (CET)
  - Summer (DST): UTC+2 (CEST)
- Website: Official website

Navarrevisca is a municipality in the south of the province of Ávila, Castile and León, Spain, located 48 kilometers from the provincial capital. It has a population of 279 inhabitants.

== Geography and environment ==
=== Location ===
Navarrevisca is located at an altitude of 1129 meters above sea level. Situated in the northern slopes of the Sierra de Gredos, it is part of an area known as Alto Alberche and borders the municipalities of Serranillos, Navalosa, Villanueva de Ávila and Mijares. It is a small mountain town with numerous springs and streams that pour into the Fernandina gorge, which in turn flows into the Alberche river in an area called La Junta.

=== Weather ===
The climate of Navarrevisca is the characteristic temperate climate with dry and cool summers of the mountain areas of the interior of the Iberian Peninsula. According to the criteria of the Köppen climate classification, Navarrevisca's climate is classified as a continentalized Mediterranean climate of the Dsb type.

== Demography ==
The population has been gradually decreasing since its peak in the 1940s. As in other nearby villages, in summer, and particularly during the month of August, the population increases considerably.

Historical population
| Year | Pop. | ±% p.a. |
|---|---|---|
| 2023 | 304 | — |
| 2024 | 299 | −1.64% |
| 2025 | 281 | −6.02% |
Source: INE

== Culture ==
=== Religious events and festivities ===
The main festivities in Navarrevisca have a religious character, being particularly popular those in honour of the Virgen de las Angustias (September 15) and San Antonio day (June 13). On January 20 the village celebrates San Sebastian day, patron saint of Navarrevisca.

The village celebrates two festivals related to farming and agriculture, the livestock fair (held on the first Saturday of October) and the farmer's fair (beginning of September).

=== Traditions ===
La moragá is a tradition which takes place on All Saint's eve. The word moragá comes from an Arabic term that refers to the act of roasting something outdoors with firewood. A minor celebration in which the villagers share roasted chestnuts and lemonade around bonfires, it is a tradition shared with other villages of the region of Gredos as well as with other towns in the north of Spain which, apparently, dates back to the Middle Ages or even further back to the Celtic traditions of the end of the summer (magosto). Given that All Saints' day coincides with the last days of harvesting the chestnuts, the inhabitants of these lands honored their dead during the day, to gather together at dusk and share a meal and roasted chestnuts.

Before Easter, the village celebrates the conscripts' day, a tradition characterized by the so-called niñato (brat). The niñato is a dummy filled with straw that is placed on the top of a vertical pole and is planted in the town square. This tradition recalls the farewell to the young people of the town when they had to leave for the mandatory military service, and although its origin remains unclear, it remembers the origins of the May day, including elements of the burnings of Judas.

Around the last weekend of August, the center of the village hosts an artisan market where both neighbors and merchants participate. This market allows visitors to buy handicrafts and watch demonstrations of traditional crafts such as manual candle making, perfumes preparation, wicker baskets making and others.

=== Tourism ===
The project of a group of volunteers calling themselves the Altruists aims at recovering a network of hiking routes that follow traditional trails around the municipality. Through the construction and restoration of bridges, refuges, fountains and trails that has been carried out, this group of people intends to recover the historical memory and the cultural heritage that the different places traversed by the proposed trails enclose, spreading among the current inhabitants and visitors, the names of the different places, sources, streams, hills, etc. of the surroundings.
