= Galician cuisine =

Typical dishes and ingredients

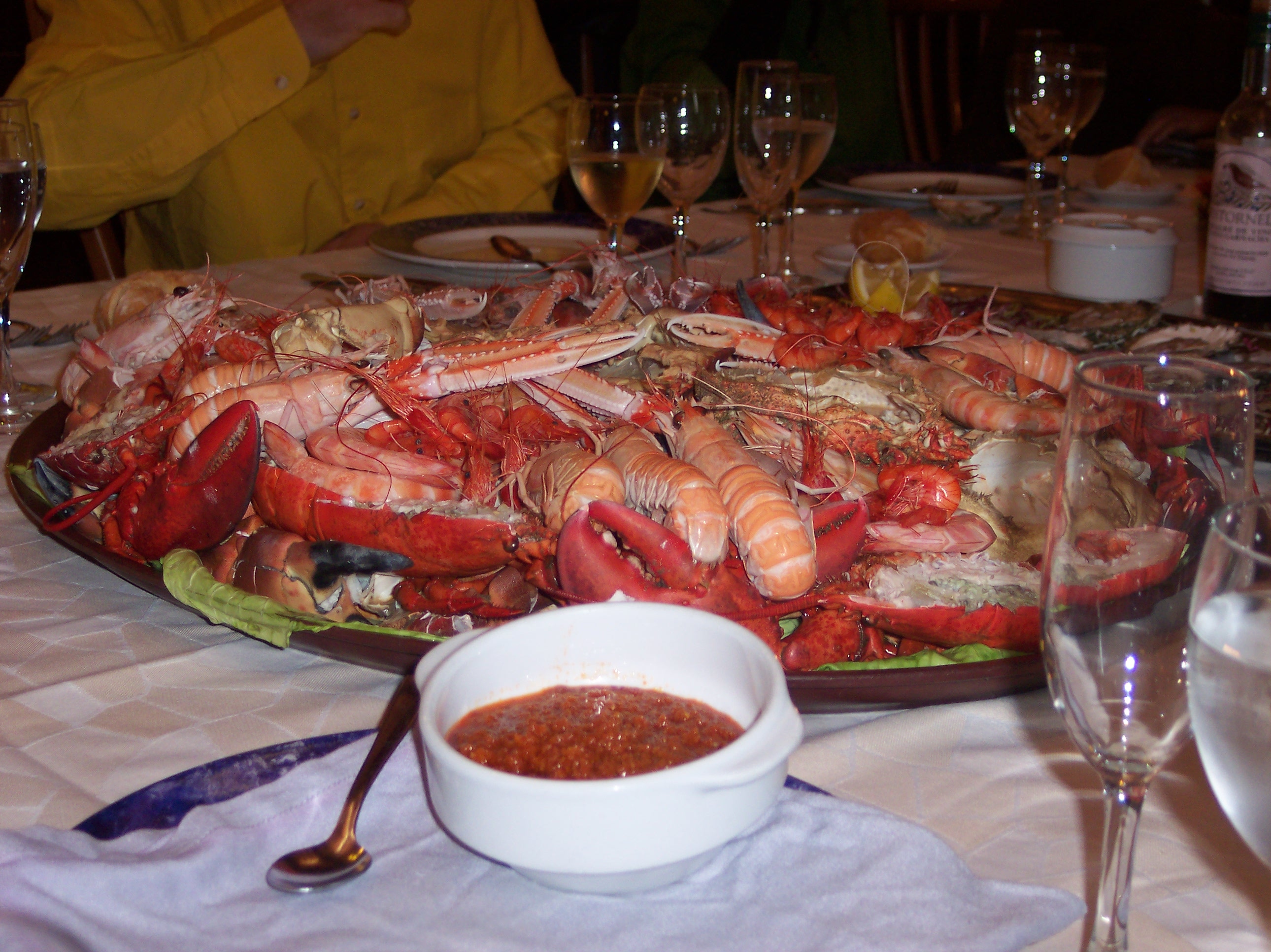
Mariscada

Galician cuisine refers to the typical dishes and ingredients found in the cuisine of the autonomous community of Galicia, Spain. These include shellfish, empanadas, polbo á feira (a dish made of octopus), cheese queixo de tetilla, ribeiro and albariño wines, and orujo liquor. Similarly to Asturian cuisine, Galician dishes have maintained several Celtic links, namely with different stews.

The potato is a staple food in the region, first arriving in Spain from the Americas in the 16th century, and then grown first and foremost on the coasts of the Ría de Noia. In Galician cuisine, neither the cook nor the recipe really matters; what is being served is the central part of the cuisine.

In Galicia, a wide variety of sea produce can be found in traditional dishes, due to the province's long shoreline and traditional fishing economy. Agricultural products such as potatoes, maize, and wheat are also staples in the Galician diet, along with dairy and meat products from cattle, sheep, and pigs; Galicia's grasses are green year-round and are excellent for grazing.

Due to the history of a weak economy, little industry, and overall a less-than-prominent position in Spanish politics and culture, the development of a Galician haute cuisine has been slowed until recently, with chefs such as Toñi Vicente gaining national attention only since the 1980s.

Galician bread (pan galego) is appreciated in the autonomous community and throughout Spain for its unique quality. It is a high-hydration bread whose flour is a mixture of indigenous and foreign wheats. In 2019 Galician bread was protected with the Protected Geographical Indication (PGI) certificate of the European Union.

== Typical dishes ==
- Polbo á feira (octopus)
- Empanada galega
- Caldo gallego (soup)
- Lacón con grelos (meat and potatoes)
- Carne ó caldeiro (meat and potatoes)
- Androlla (pork sausage)
- Botelo or butelo (pork sausage)
- Filloas (Galician crêpes)
- Bica (sponge cake)
- Tarta de Santiago

== See also ==
- Galician wine
- Atlantic diet
