= Broa de Avintes =

Bread of Avintes

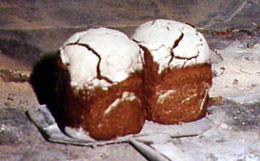
- Broa de Avintes, a rye bread traditionally made in Northern Portugal.
- Alternative names: Boroa de Avintes
- Type: bread
- Place of origin: Portugal
- Region or state: Avintes
- Associated cuisine: Portugal
- Invented: ca. 16th century
- Cooking time
- Serving temperature: hot or cold
- Main ingredients: corn and rye flour

Broa de Avintes or Boroa de Avintes (locally) is a type of broa from Avintes, Vila Nova de Gaia with a long tradition in the north of Portugal. It is a dark brown, very dense bread made with maize and rye flours, with a distinctive and intense bittersweet flavour.

== History ==
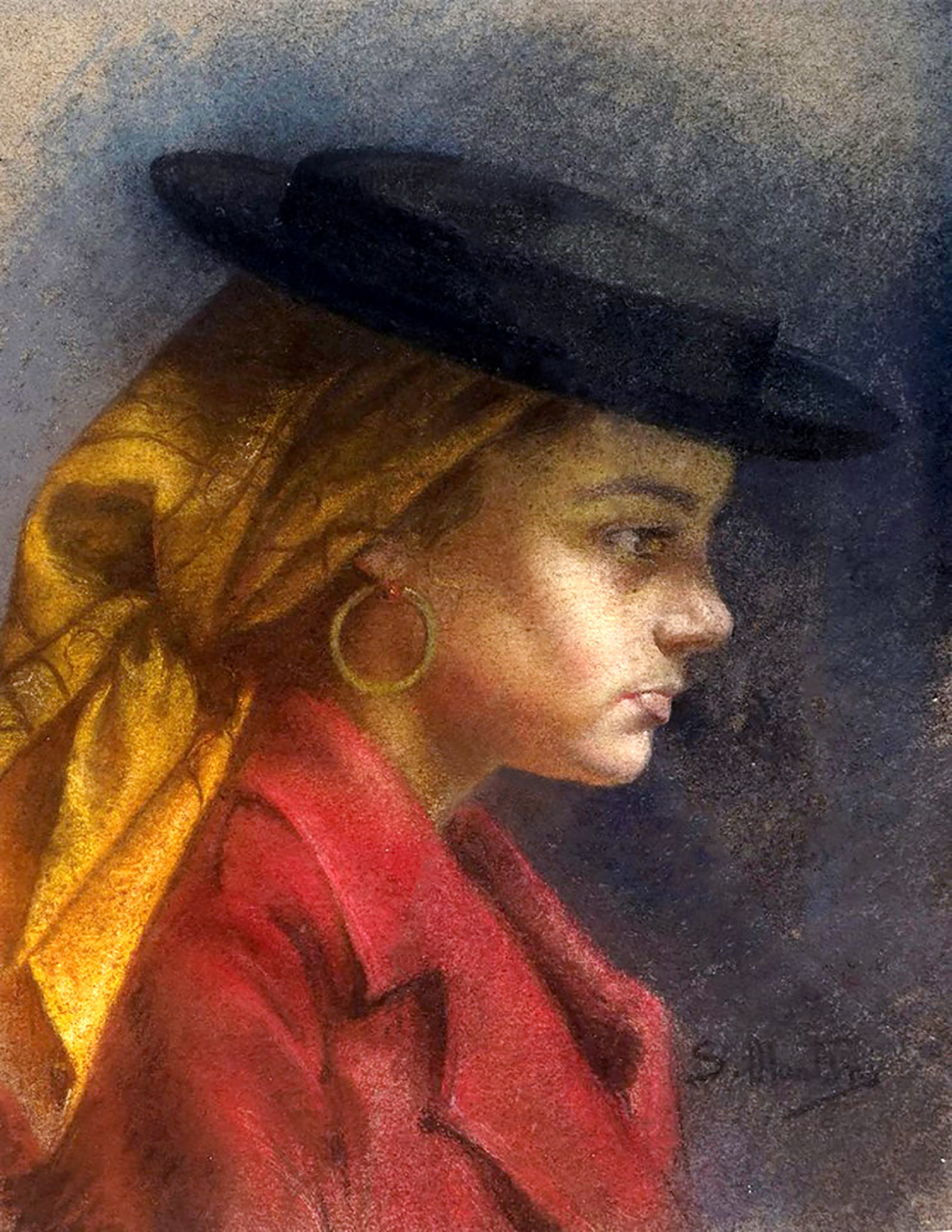
Avintes woman with typical costume, by Sofia Martins de Sousa

"The word broa is believed to originate either from the Suebian or Gothic brauth, meaning 'bread', or from Celtic roots such as bron or bara, though some scholars argue for a pre-Roman origin, as evidenced by similar terms like Spanish borona, Galician boroa, and Asturian borona."

This type of bread existed in Gallaecia at least since Suebian times. Prior to the addition of maize to the mixture, the main ingredients of broa were rye and malt. After maize was introduced in Europe from the Americas, "broa" became widely associated with "maize bread".

Broa has been produced in Avintes since the 13th century, when King Dinis of Portugal awarded the village with the exclusive right of production and supply to the population in Porto. However, the earliest record of the production of the Avintes variety only dates back to 1563.

Nowadays, the bread of Avintes is also produced outside its original parish with industrial source materials The old mills of Avintes no longer have economic relevance. However, for the sake of tradition, the people of Avintes have maintained its crafty production, which is well appreciated by consumers who increasingly seek genuinely traditional products. Since 1989, the parish of Avintes organizes a yearly celebration, Festa da Broa (Party of Broa) and since 1997 there has been a confraria (brotherhood) dedicated to it.

== Production ==
It has a particularly slow manufacturing process: it is baked for about five to six hours in the oven. Once cooked, it is sprinkled with flour. The bread generally has the shape of a bell tower. It typically comes in two sizes: a large loaf shaped in a bowl weighing 8 to 9 kg with a diameter of 30 cm, and a small loaf shaped on a smaller dish (escudela) weighing 1 kg with a diameter of 10 cm.

Connected to its production are many so-called "secrets" which, real or not, lay in the certitudes and knowledge gained from experience of many generations of Avintes' bakers as well as the judicious choice of materials used. There were also some superstitions related to its mixing and baking, involving prayers and blessings, as indeed in the rest of Portugal when making bread in the old fashioned ways.

The "brôa" can also be served fried - for example, during Christmas as part of typical dishes in some of the northerners' homes. It is also used as the basis for multiple meal starters, for example with presunto (cured ham) and with traditional Portuguese "caldo verde" or "green broth".

== See also ==
- Broa
- List of Portuguese dishes
