= Gova Kaldu =

Sri Lankan cabbage and chicken broth

- Type: Soup
- Place of origin: Sri Lanka
- Main ingredients: Cabbage, Chicken

Gova Kaldu is a traditional Sri Lankan spiced cabbage and chicken broth. It was often served with Idiyappam (string hoppers).

This dish is most likely of Portuguese origin, its name, kaldu is derived from caldo, the Portuguese name for broth and gova from the Portuguese cabbage known as couve tronchuda.

It was quite popular among elite Sinhalese families of the olden days until the early part of the 20th century.

== See also ==
- Caldo verde
- List of soups
