= Embutido =

Sausage

Embutido (Spanish and Brazilian Portuguese), enchido (European Portuguese), and embotit (Catalan) are generic terms for cured ground meat products. The dictionary of the Royal Spanish Academy defines it as "intestine stuffed with minced meat, mainly pork; intestine stuffed with diverse ingredients" (the Spanish word comes from the verb embutir, meaning 'to stuff'). The term often applies to any of the many varieties of cured, dry sausages found in the cuisines of Iberia and the former Spanish and Portuguese colonies.

In Philippine cuisine, however, due to the fusion of Spanish and American cuisine in the islands, embutido (or embotido) refers to a type of meatloaf wrapped around slices of egg and sausage.

== Varieties ==
Specific varieties include, among many others (see list of sausages for the various countries):

- Chorizo, also known as chouriço
- Sobrassada from the Balearic Islands
- Botifarra from Catalonia
- Butifarras soledeñas
- Fuet from Catalonia
- Salchichón
- Blood sausage (morcilla, morcela)
- Androlla from Galicia
- Linguiça (longaniza)
- Alheira
- Farinheira
- Botillo (botelo), also known as chouriço de ossos
- Paio
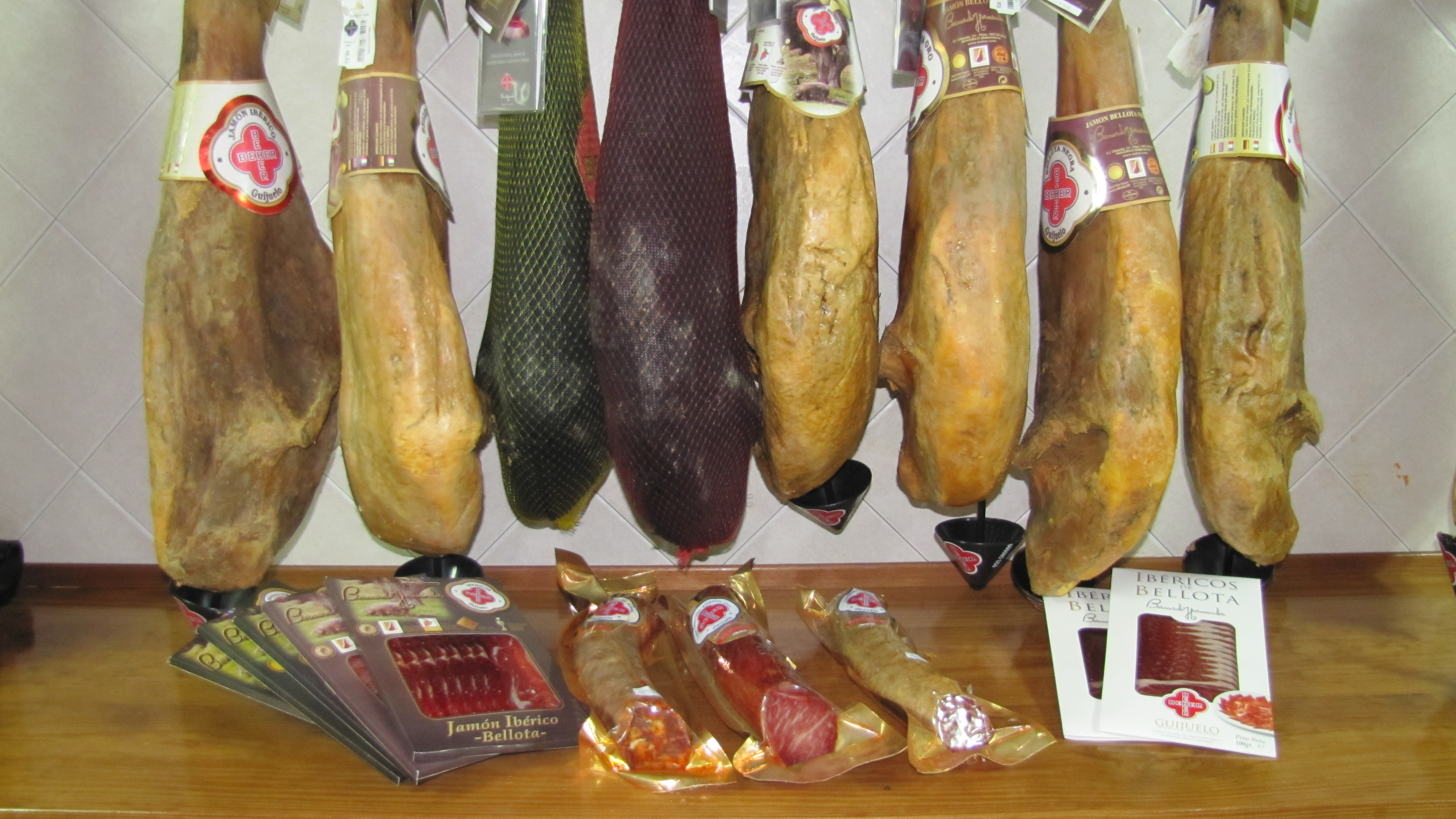
Display of embutidos

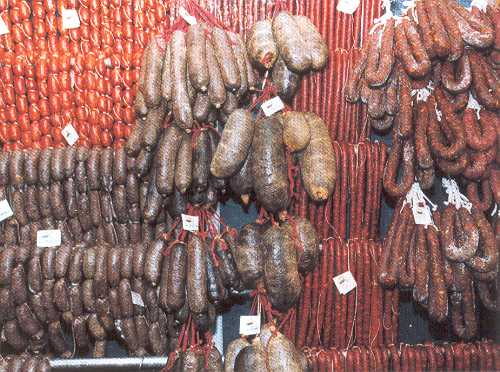
Embutidos from Spain

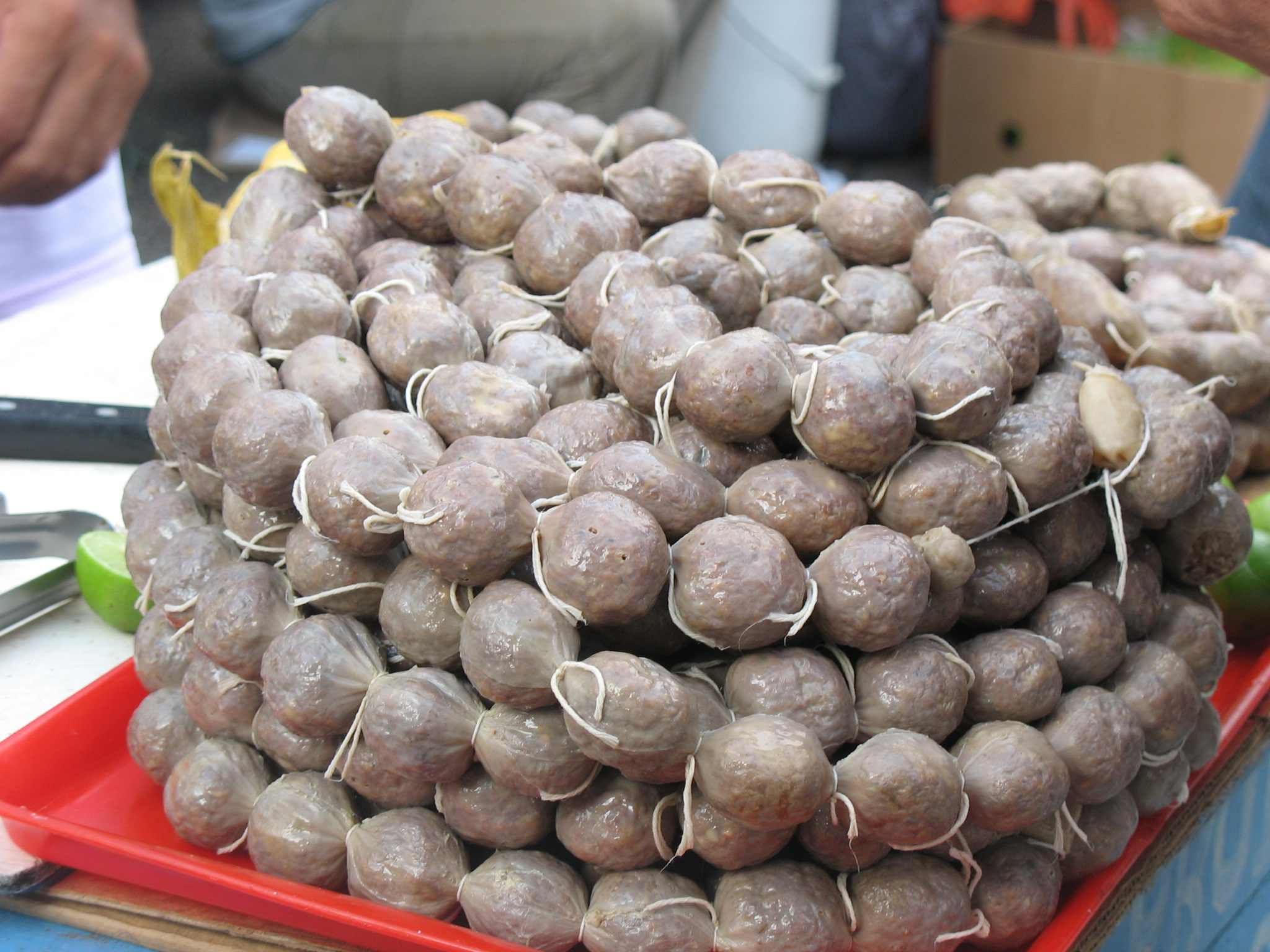
Butifarras soledeñas from Colombia

== See also ==
- List of sausages
