= Jeropiga =

Portuguese alcoholic drink

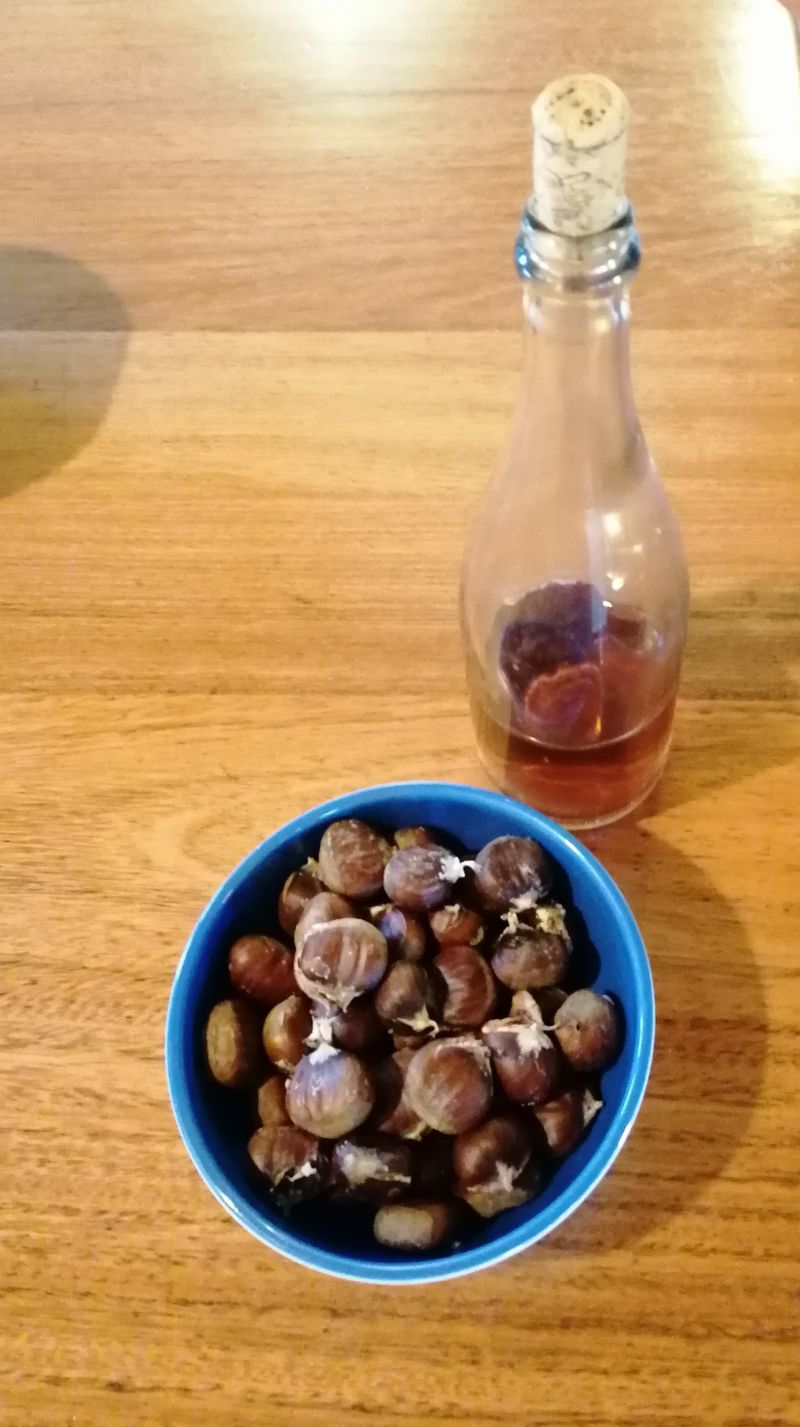
Chestnuts are usually accompanied with jeropiga during magosto festivities in Portugal.

Jeropiga is the name given to a traditional alcoholic drink of Portuguese origin that is prepared by adding aguardente to grape must. The addition is made in the beginning of the fermentation process, making it different to another Portuguese traditional drink, the abafado, in which aguardente is added during the fermentation process.

== Preparation ==
The usual given ratios for the confection of jeropiga are of two parts of must to one part of aguardente or brandy. The must's natural fermentation process is interrupted by the addition of the alcohol.

Jeropiga traditionally accompanies the magosto autumn festivals, celebrated also in northern Spain and Catalonia, where the festival is known as Castanyada. Jeropiga is home-brewed and drunk throughout the year in Trás-os-Montes and the Beira regions in Central Portugal.

== Historic use in fortified wines ==
Historically, jeropiga has been added to Port wine to increase its sweetness, in a practise that is still applied today to some fortified wines. The historic use of jeropiga mixed with brandy and elderberries as a means of coloring in red wines has also been recorded. Nineteenth-century English writers largely dismissed jeropiga when discussing the port wine trade, with W. H. Bidwell calling it an "adulteration used to bringing up the character of ports". In 1844, the English wine merchant Joseph James Forrester anonymously published A Word or Two on Port Wine, a pamphlet that, among other criticisms made to the wine trade in the Douro region, denounced the use of jeropiga in wine.

== Sources ==
- Agnew, John Holmes; Bidwell, Walter Hilliard, eds. (1853). "Wine and Wine-Drinkers". The Eclectic Magazine of Foreign Literature, Science, and Art. 28. New York: W. H. Bidwell: 62 – via Google Books.
- Hassall, Arthur Hill (1876). "Wine and Its Adulterations". Food: Its Adulterations, and the Methods for Their Detection. University of Michigan. ISBN 978-1527864320 – via Google Books.
- Mayson, Richard (2018). Port and the Douro: Fourth Edition. Classic Wine Library. Infinite Ideas. ISBN 978-1999619381 – via Google Books.
- Souza, Julio Seabra Inglez; Peixoto, Aristeu Mendes; de Toledo, Francisco Ferraz (1995). "Jeropiga". Enciclopédia agrícola brasileira: I-M - Volume 4 (in Portuguese). University of São Paulo. ISBN 978-8531407192 – via Google Books.
- Thudichum, John Louis William; Dupré, August (1872). "Jeropiga". A Treatise on the Origin, Nature, and Varieties of Wine: Being a Complete Manual of Viticulture and Oenology. Cornell University Library. ISBN 978-1112369544 – via Google Books.
