= Androlla =

An androlla (Galician pronunciation: [anˈdɾoɟɐ]) is a Galician sausage. It is a type of embutido made from pork. It is similar to the botillo sausages of León.

It is a semi-dry traditional sausage made from pork and pork skin and flavored with garlic, oregano, white wine, and pimentón in natural casings. It is smoked and dried for two months after being made.

It is prepared from the "cueras" (the end of a slab of bacon). Cueras are well cleaned, without the skin; rib meat is added with portions of the diaphragm muscles. It is eaten cooked and is often accompanied by "cachelos" (boiled potatoes).

In the regions of León and Zamora, the word "androlla" can refer to any kind of pork sausage.

Traditionally it is made from porco celta pigs, which are local to the area and free-roaming.

== See also ==
- Galician cuisine
