= Navalosa =

- municipality
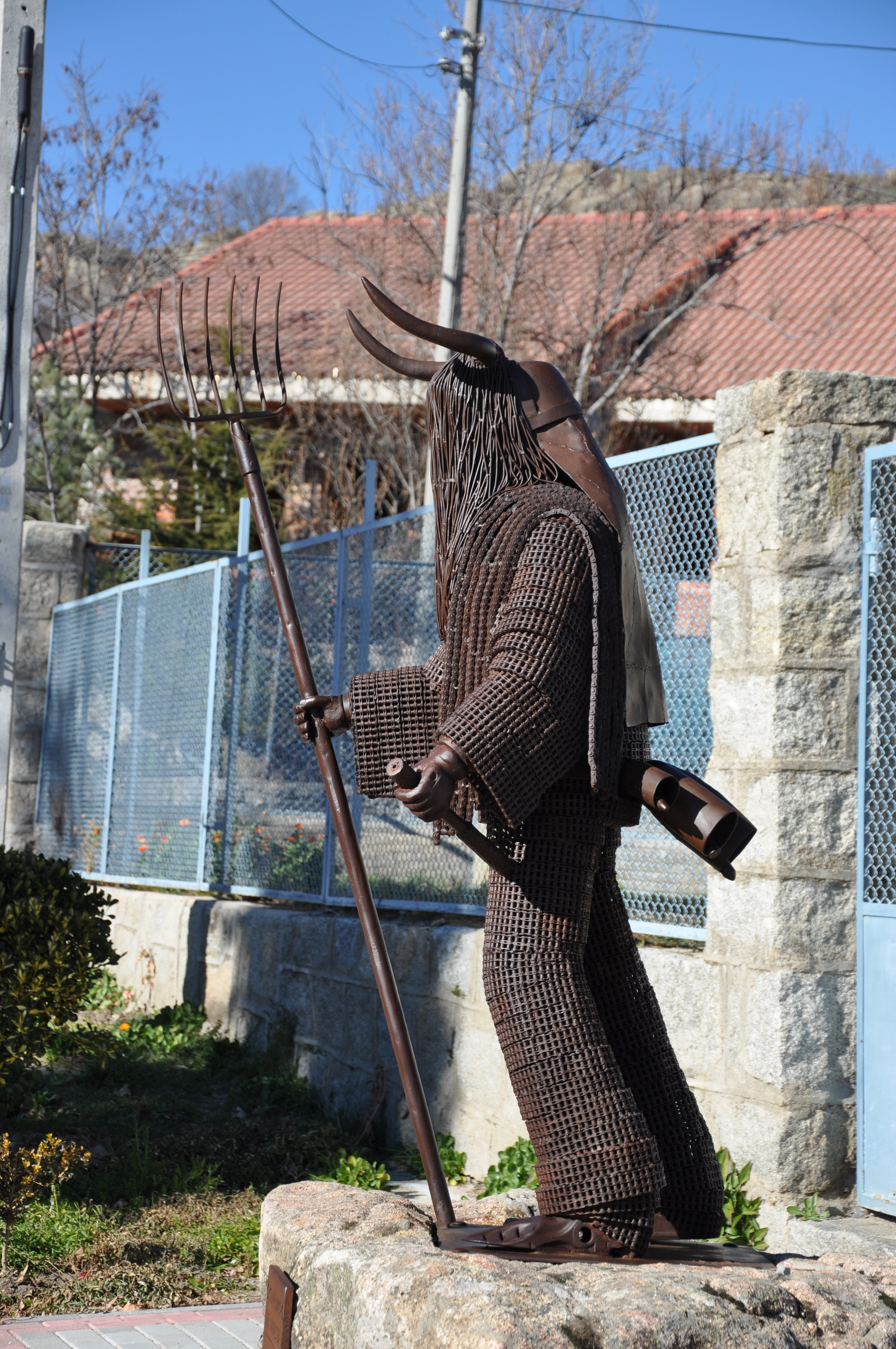
- Cucurrumacho, character of the carnival in Navalosa

- Flag Coat of arms

- Location in Spain. Navalosa (Spain)
- Coordinates: 40°24′05″N 4°55′53″W
- Country: Spain
- Autonomous community: Castile and León
- Province: Ávila
- Municipality: Navalosa

Area
  - Total: 30 km^{2} (12 sq mi)

Population (2025-01-01)
  - Total: 314
  - Density: 10/km^{2} (27/sq mi)
- Time zone: UTC+1 (CET)
  - Summer (DST): UTC+2 (CEST)
- Website: Official website

Navalosa is a municipality located in the province of Ávila, Castile and León, Spain.

== Population ==
Historical population
Year	Pop.	±% p.a.
2023	323	—
2024	324	+0.31%
2025	314	−3.09%
Source: INE
