= Villanueva de Ávila =

- municipality
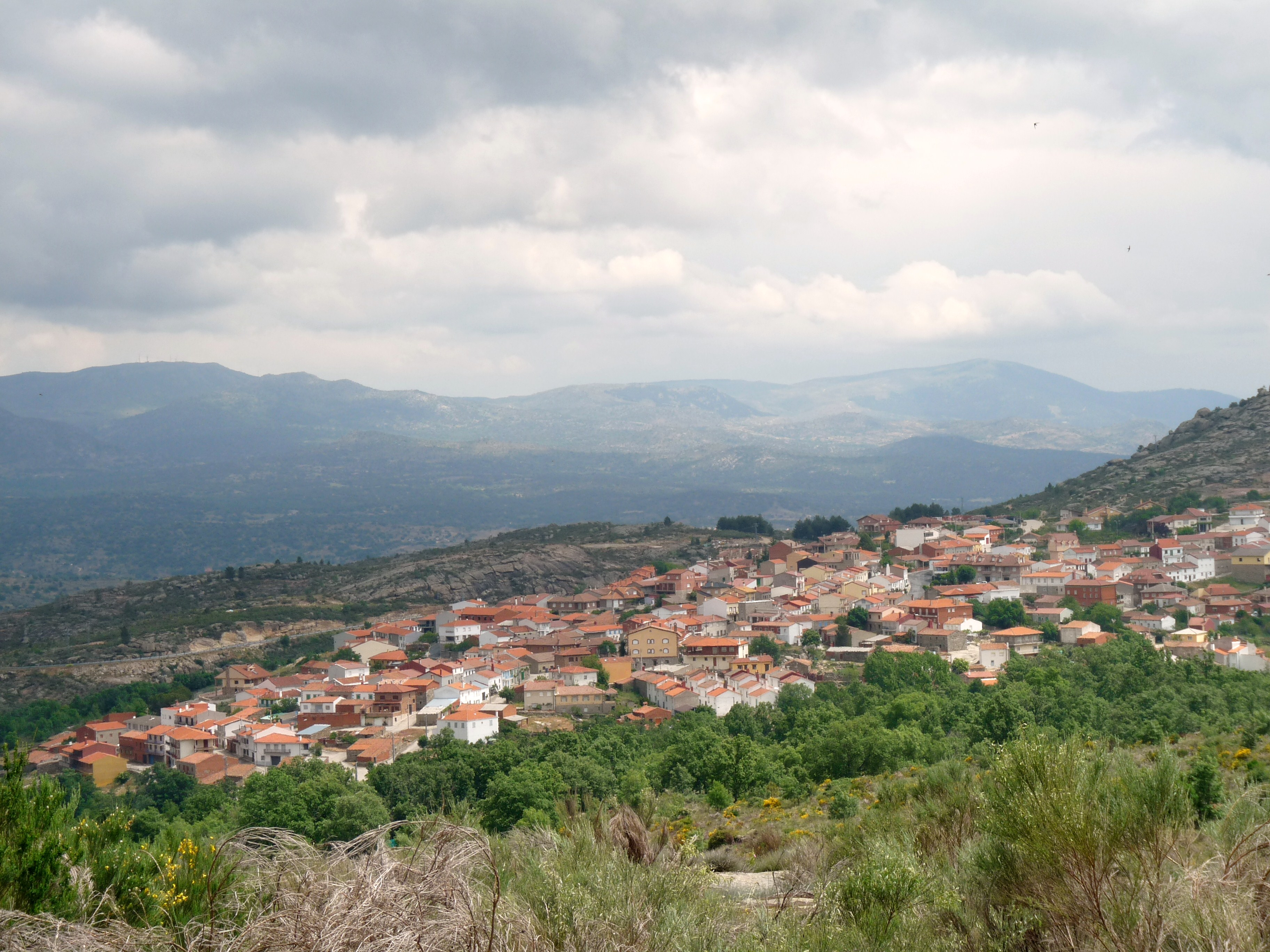

- Flag Coat of arms

- Location in Spain. Villanueva de Ávila (Spain)
- Coordinates: 40°22′47″N 4°49′19″W
- Country: Spain
- Autonomous community: Castile and León
- Province: Ávila
- Municipality: Villanueva de Ávila

Area
  - Total: 21 km^{2} (8.1 sq mi)

Population (2025-01-01)
  - Total: 202
  - Density: 9.6/km^{2} (25/sq mi)
- Time zone: UTC+1 (CET)
  - Summer (DST): UTC+2 (CEST)
- Website: Official website

Villanueva de Ávila is a municipality located in the province of Ávila, Castile and León, Spain.

== Population ==
Historical population
Year	Pop.	±% p.a.
2023	230	—
2024	227	−1.30%
2025	202	−11.01%
Source: INE
