= Polbo á feira =

Galician octopus dish

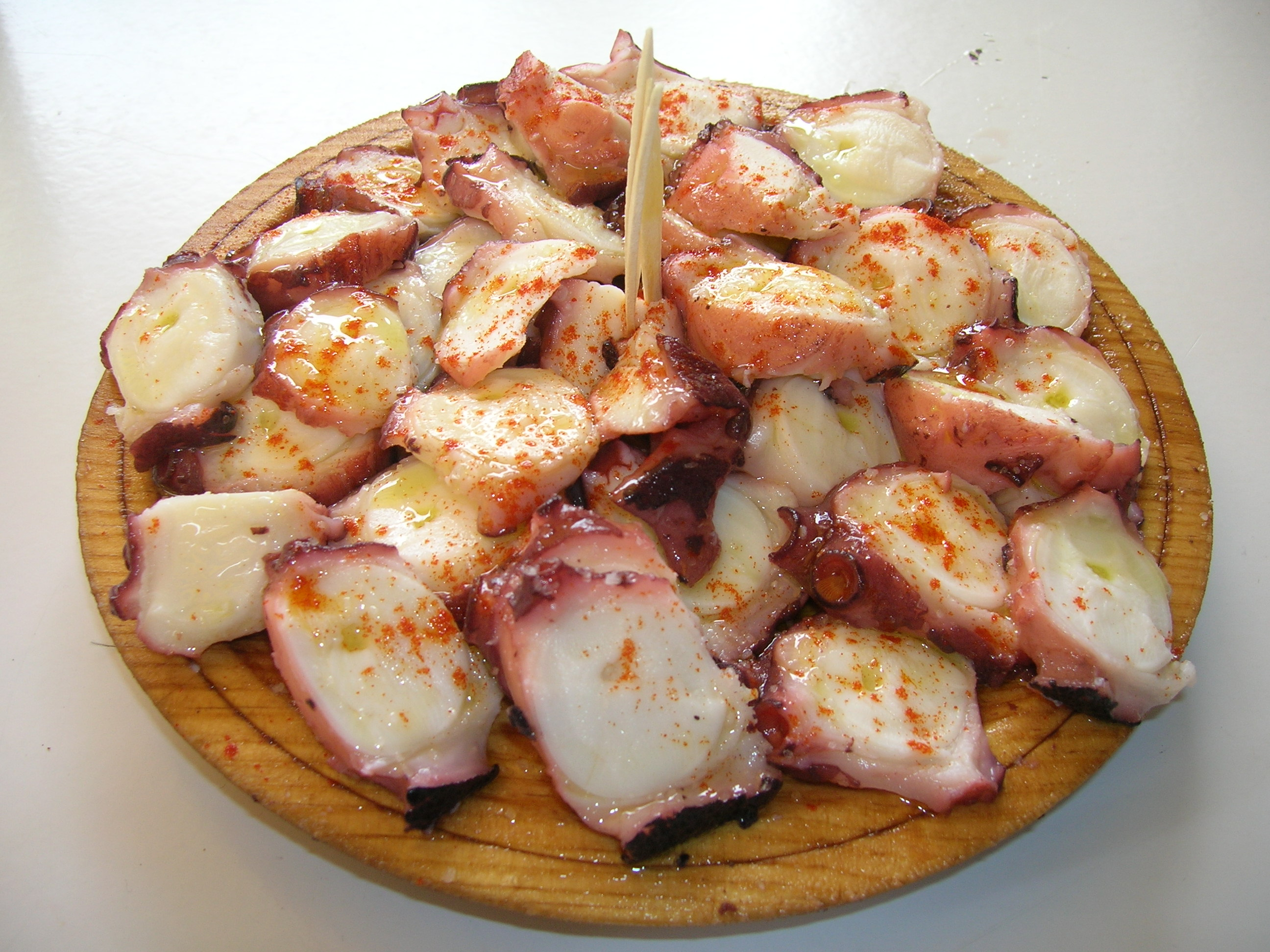
- Alternative names: Pulpo a la gallega
- Course: Main dish
- Place of origin: Spain
- Region or state: Galicia
- Serving temperature: Hot
- Main ingredients: Common octopus, olive oil, salt, mild and hot paprika

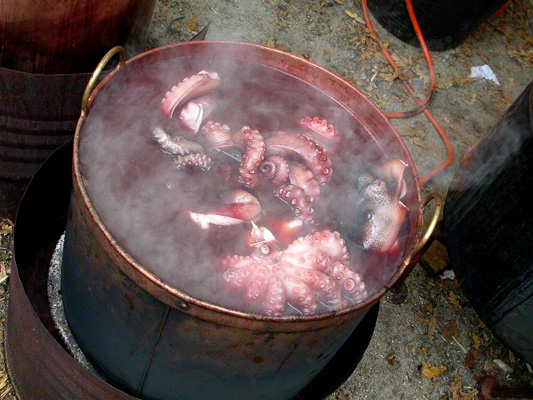
Polbo á feira

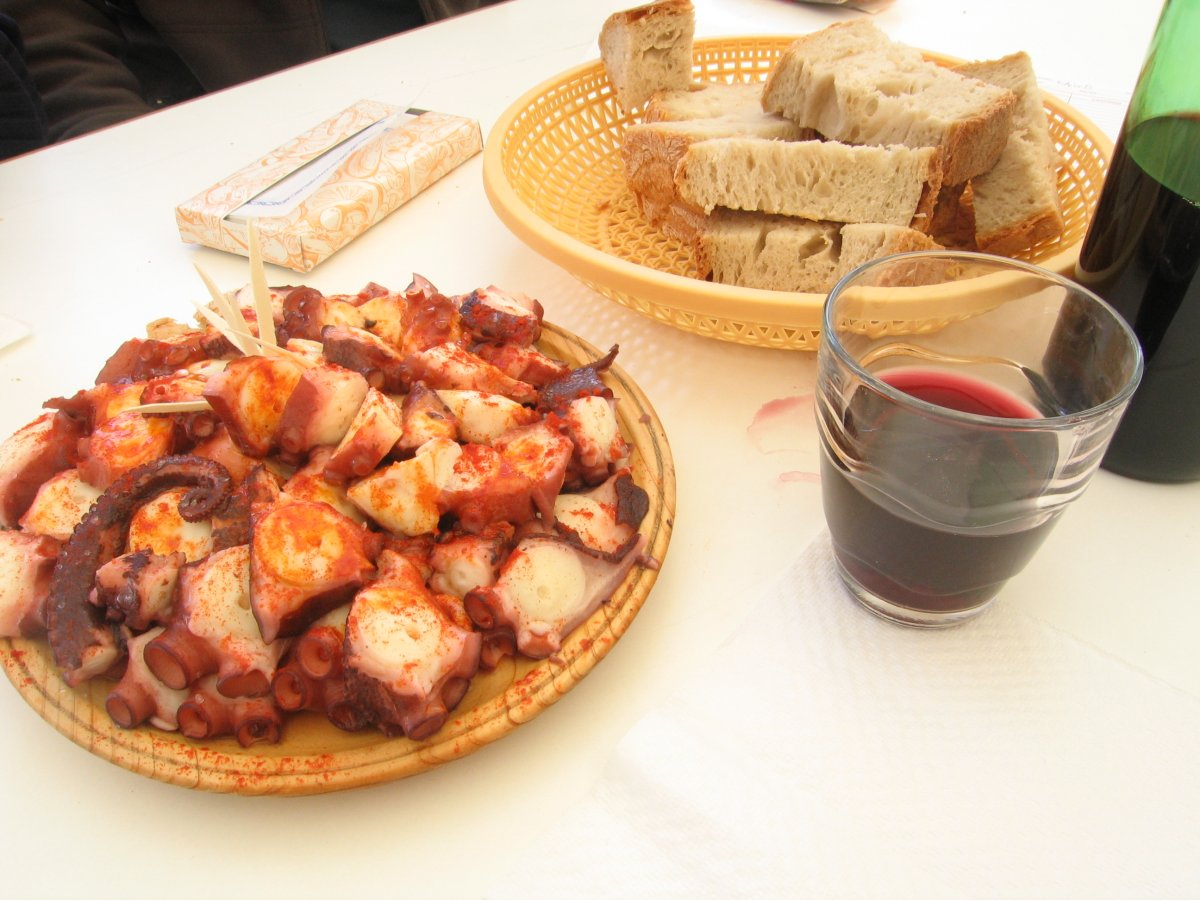
Polbo á feira with bread and wine

Polbo á feira (literally meaning "fair-style octopus", or pulpo a la gallega in Spanish, meaning "Galician-style octopus"), is a traditional Galician dish.

The provinces of Ourense and Lugo have a reputation for cooking octopus. Fair-style octopus is the totemic food of the patron saint festivities of Lugo (San Froilán). Some Galician cooks specialize in this dish. They are usually women, known as polbeiras. After the modern decline of traditional rural fairs, many polbeiras (octopus restaurants) have sprouted across Galicia. They tend to be rustic eateries rather than fancy restaurants.

== Origins ==
Its name is due to being traditionally prepared and eaten at rural fairs and romerías. It was a common dish at a time when slow means of transportation made fresh seafood only available near the coast, which meant inland towns had to make do with stockfish (mainly cod, conger and octopus).

== Preparation ==
This dish is prepared by first boiling the octopus inside a copper cauldron. Before boiling it, the octopus' tentacles are dipped in and out of the boiling water three times, while being held by its head—this is meant to curl the tips of the tentacles. The tentacles are preferred over the head, which sometimes is discarded. After the octopus has been boiled, it is trimmed with scissors, sprinkled with coarse salt and both sweet and spicy paprika (known in Galicia as pemento and pemento picante) and drizzled with olive oil. The optimal cooking point is reached when the octopus is not rubbery but not overcooked, similarly to the al dente concept when cooking pasta. This is after a 20–45 minutes boil (approximately 15 min/kg octopus), provided the octopus is left to rest for a further 20 minutes inside the boiled water away from the fire.

In the last decades, frozen octopus has replaced dried octopus. Fresh octopus is not so frequently used nowadays either, as it is necessary to pound it heavily before cooking to avoid the meat becoming rubbery. This procedure can be skipped because freezing, unlike other seafood, does not alter the organoleptic properties of octopus.

Tradition dictates that water should not be drunk when eating octopus, so the dish was traditionally accompanied with young Galician red wine, especially at inland fairs, although it is now more commonly paired with dry white wines such as Albariño.

== See also ==
- List of seafood dishes
