= Paio =

Traditional embutido Iberian sausage

Paio is a traditional embutido Iberian sausage mainly produced in Spain, Portugal and Brazil.

In Iberia, its production is concentrated in Southwest Spain and the Portuguese Alentejo region.

Paio is made of pork loin, seasoned with garlic, salt, and Capsicum pepper and smoked.

It is a hard sausage, usually made in a large diameter, and can be sliced and eaten on bread.

In Brazil it is a common ingredient of the bean stew feijoada.

== See also ==
- List of sausages
