= Botillo =

Dry-cured pork sausage from northwestern Iberia

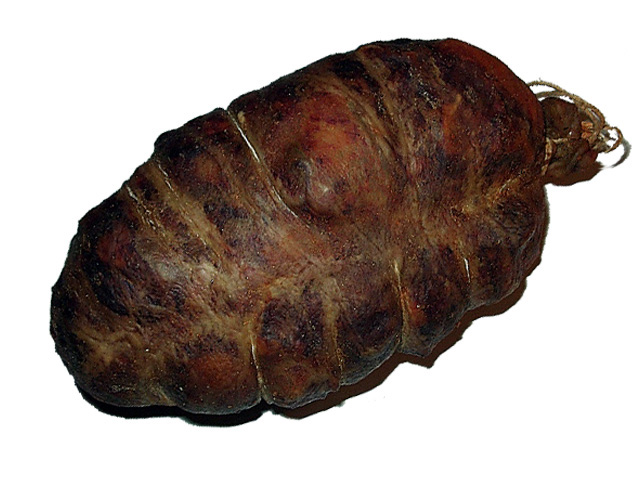
Botillo from El Bierzo

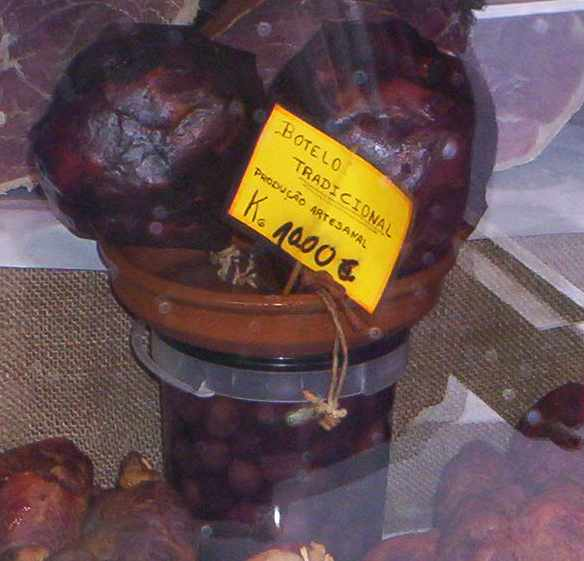
Portuguese botelo, in Mirandela

Botillo (Spanish: [boˈtijo]), butiellu (Leonese: [buˈtjeʎʊ]) or botelo (Galician: [boˈtɛlʊ], Portuguese: [buˈtɛlu]; also known as chouriço de ossos in Portuguese) is a dish of meat-stuffed pork intestine. It is a culinary specialty of El Bierzo, a northern county in the Spanish province of León, and also of the region of Trás-os-Montes in Portugal. The Spanish term botillo, the Portuguese term botelo and Leonese term butiellu derive from the Latin word botellus, meaning intestine.

It is also found in Extremadura, where it is known as buche or buche de costillas.

This type of Embutido/Enchido is a meat product made from different pieces left over from the butchering of a pig, including the ribs, tail, and bones with a little meat left on them. These are chopped up, seasoned with salt, paprika, garlic, and marjoram, and left to sit for approximately two days. After this rest period, it is stuffed in the cecum of the pig. It is smoked for a week or two, then dried. Its composition is similar to androlla, another dry-cured sausage from northwestern Spain.

It can also include the pig's tongue, shoulder blade, jaw, and backbone, but never exceeding 20% of the total volume. It is normally consumed cooked, covered with a sheet. Flavored with Chorizo/Chouriço/Chourizu, the pig's ear and snout together with very tender cabbage makes a stew.

The preparation and curing of botillo occurs over a period of at least five days and consists of four phases:

- Selection and butchering of the raw material.
- Seasoning and stuffing proceeding to the mixing and knead of the gut. Afterwards the cecum is stuffed as before, in its place, were cured and seasoned to achieve the color and the ideal preserving of the tripe.
- Smoking, with smoke from natural oak or holm oak (encina) wood.
- Dried over two days in drying rooms prepared to ensure that the moisture is finally eliminated and that the product achieves a superior consistency.

== See also ==
- Androlla
- List of stuffed dishes
