= Broa =

Type of bread

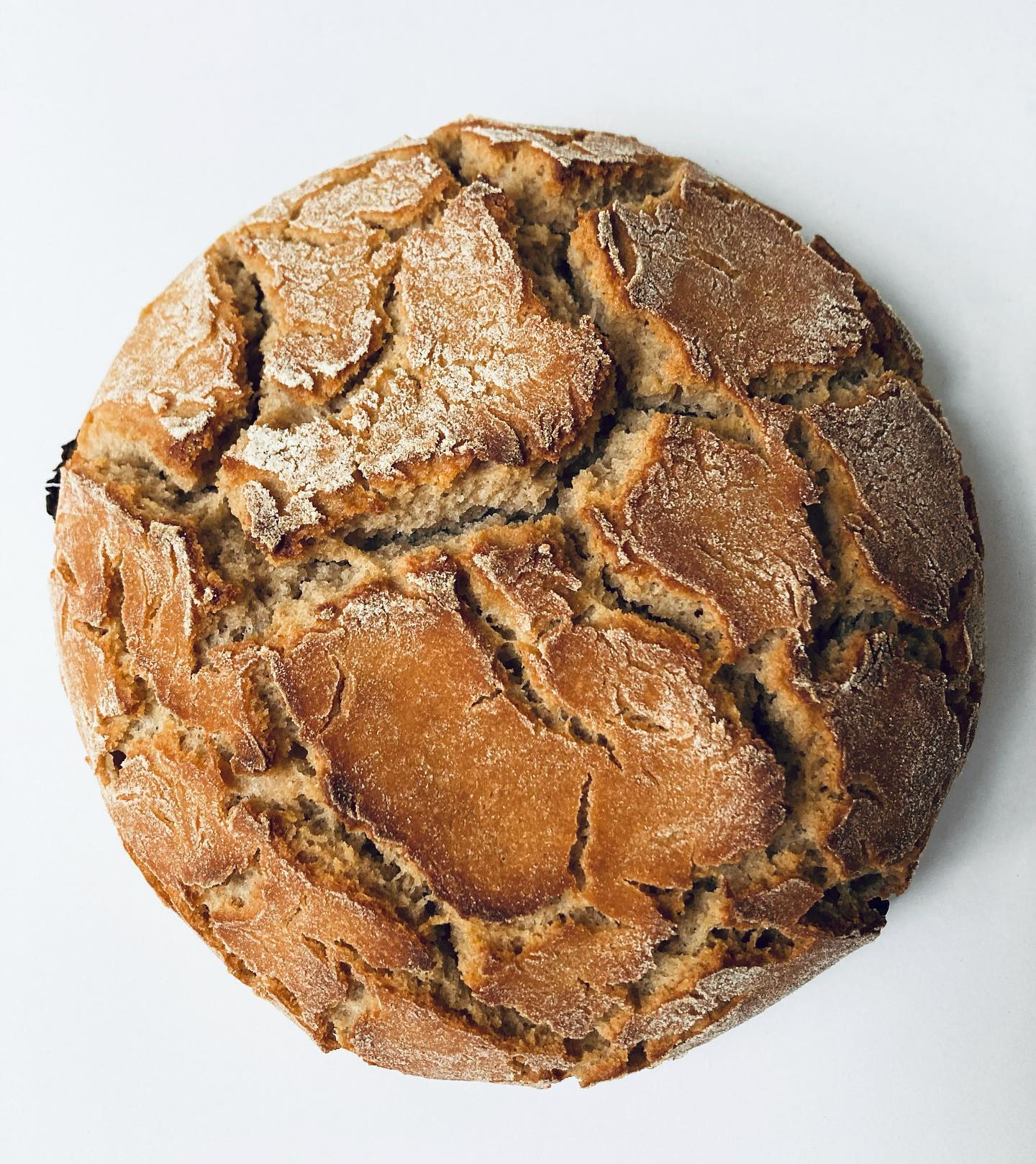
- Type: Cornbread
- Place of origin: Portugal, Galicia
- Main ingredients: Cornmeal, wheat or rye flour, yeast

Broa ([ˈbɾowɐ] or [ˈbɾoɐ]) is a type of maize or rye bread traditionally made in Portugal and Galicia. It exists in somewhat different versions in Portuguese speaking countries like Angola, Brazil, Cape Verde, Mozambique. The Portuguese broas are either made from a mixture of cornmeal, rye, barley, wheat flour and yeast, baking soda or baking powder, or simply from rye and yeast. Before maize was brought from the Americas in the fifteenth century, broa was mostly made from rye. In Brazil, broa is more closely related to cornbread, likely a Native American influence, traditionally seasoned with fennel.

There is some debate regarding the etymology of broa in Portuguese. It may originate from the Suebian or Gothic word *braudą meaning 'bread', 'slice', 'piece' probably via *𐌱𐍂𐌰𐌿𐌸. Alternatively, it could derive from a Celtic root *borŭna (uncertain), as suggested for similar terms like Spanish borona, Galician boroa, and Asturian borona.

In Portugal, broa de Avintes, is a type of broa listed on the Ark of Taste. This traditional rye bread has the rustic flavor and texture that suitably accompanies traditional soups, such as caldo verde. In different regions, broa de milho, broa de centeio, broa escura de centeio, broa de milho e cevada and other variations are typically consumed with dishes such as fish stews, cheeses, cured meats, chouriço, grilled fish, and wines.

In the Philippines, broa (or broas) traditionally refer to ladyfingers, and not to a type of cornbread. Additionally, in Guyana, broas are instead a style of sugar cookies (or biscuits), flavored with lime, cinnamon, and nutmeg.

== See also ==
- List of maize dishes
