= Sofia Martins de Sousa =

Portuguese artist (1870–1960)

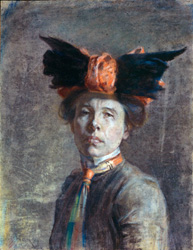
- Self-portrait, c. 1900
- Born: 23 March 1870; Porto, Portugal
- Died: 28 November 1960 (aged 90); Porto, Portugal
- Education: Fine-Arts Academy of Porto and Julian Academy
- Known for: Painting

Sofia Martins de Sousa (23 March 1870 – 28 November 1960) was a Portuguese painter.

== Biography ==
She was born in Porto, Portugal, the youngest of seven children to Portuguese emigrants António Martins de Sousa and Olinda Peres. The family lived in Brazil and Chile before moving back to Porto, Portugal in 1869. They lived in the Quinta da China near the Douro River in a home bought by her father before he died in 1874, when she was four years old. She was sister of the painter Aurélia de Souza.

She began taking lessons with António da Costa Lima. She began studies at the Fine-Arts Academy of Porto, where she was a pupil of João Marques de Oliveira, who greatly influenced her style.

In 1898, she moved to Paris to study painting at the Julian Academy, taking courses with Jean-Paul Laurens and Jean-Joseph Benjamin-Constant. She held her first exhibition, then traveled in Europe in the next three years, before finally returning to Portugal in 1901.

She died in Porto in 1960.

Her painting was of a personal and naturalist style, at times with Realism, Impressionism and Post-Impressionism influences. Her subjects included portraits, landscapes, and scenes of everyday life. She is most famous for her "Self-Portrait", painted in 1900.

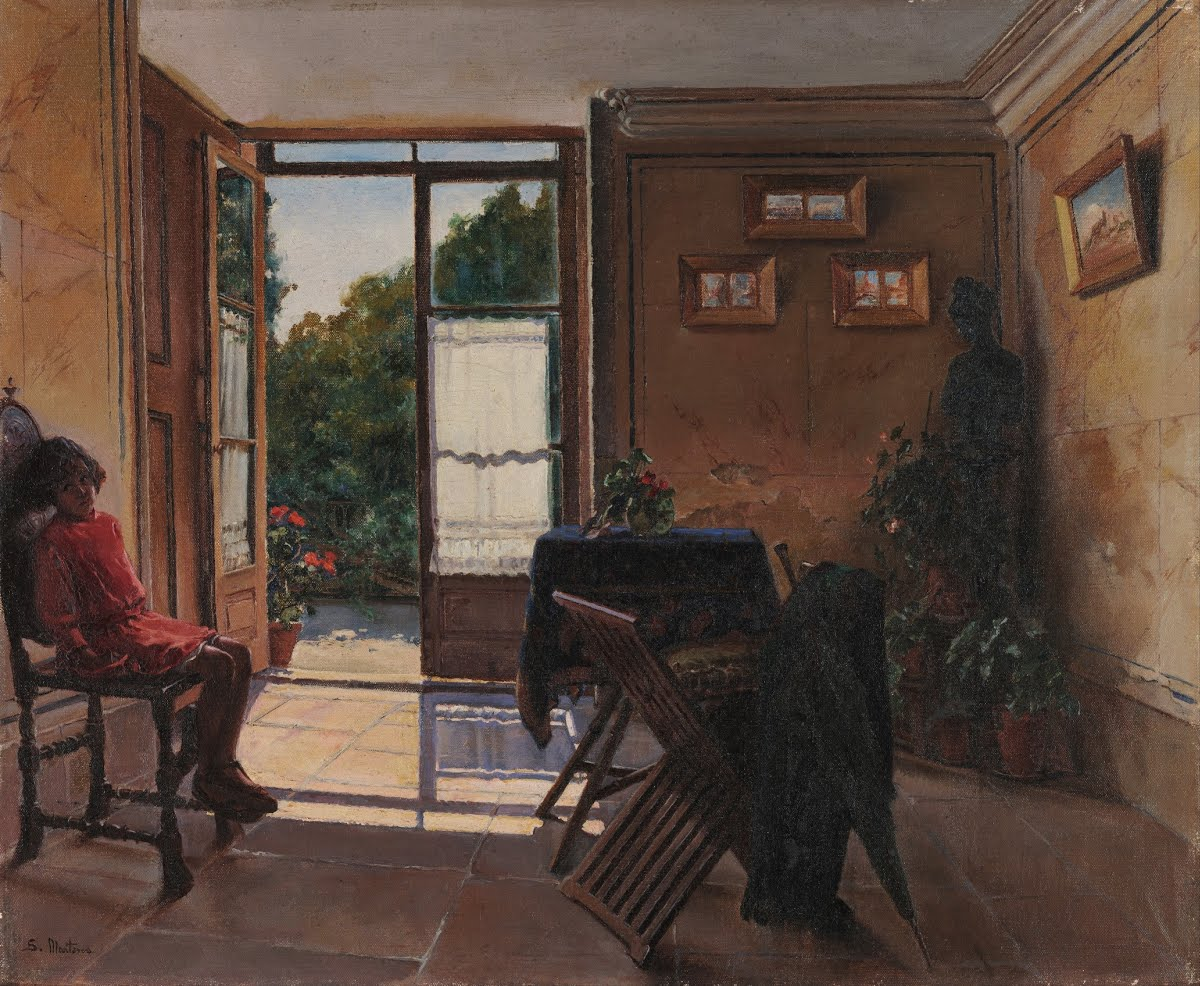
In punishment

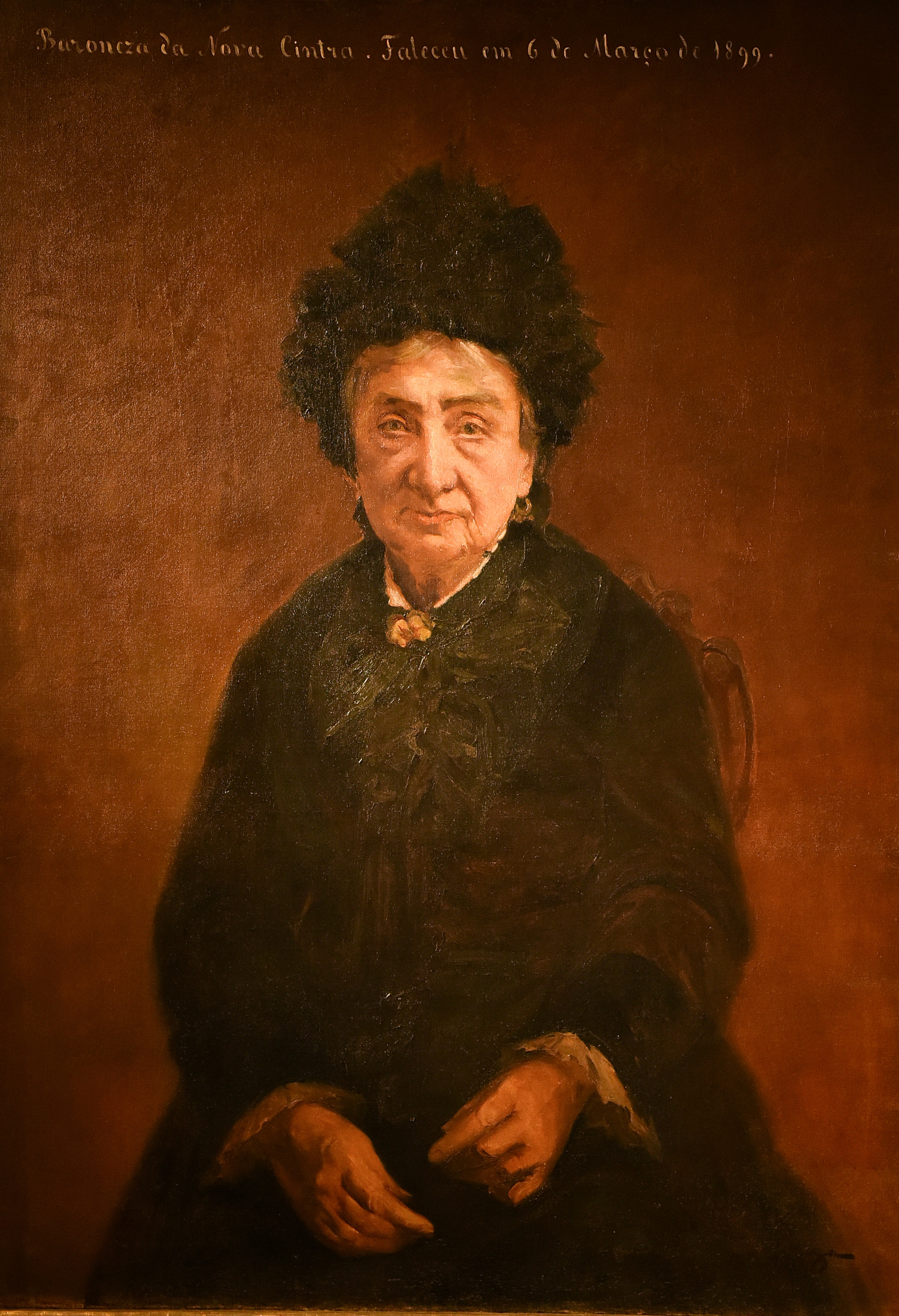
Portrait of the Baroness of Nova Sintra, c. 1900

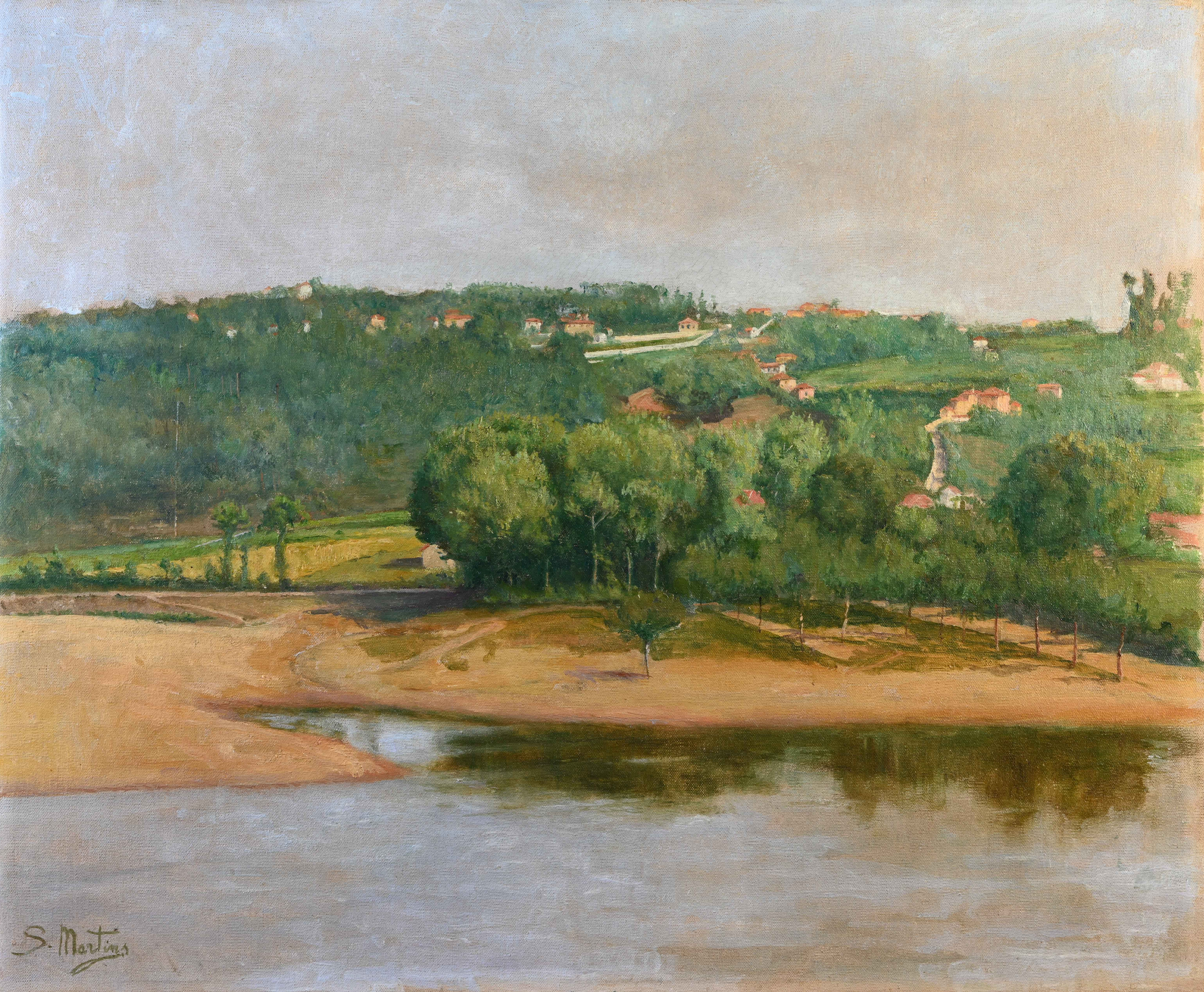
The Areinho Beach

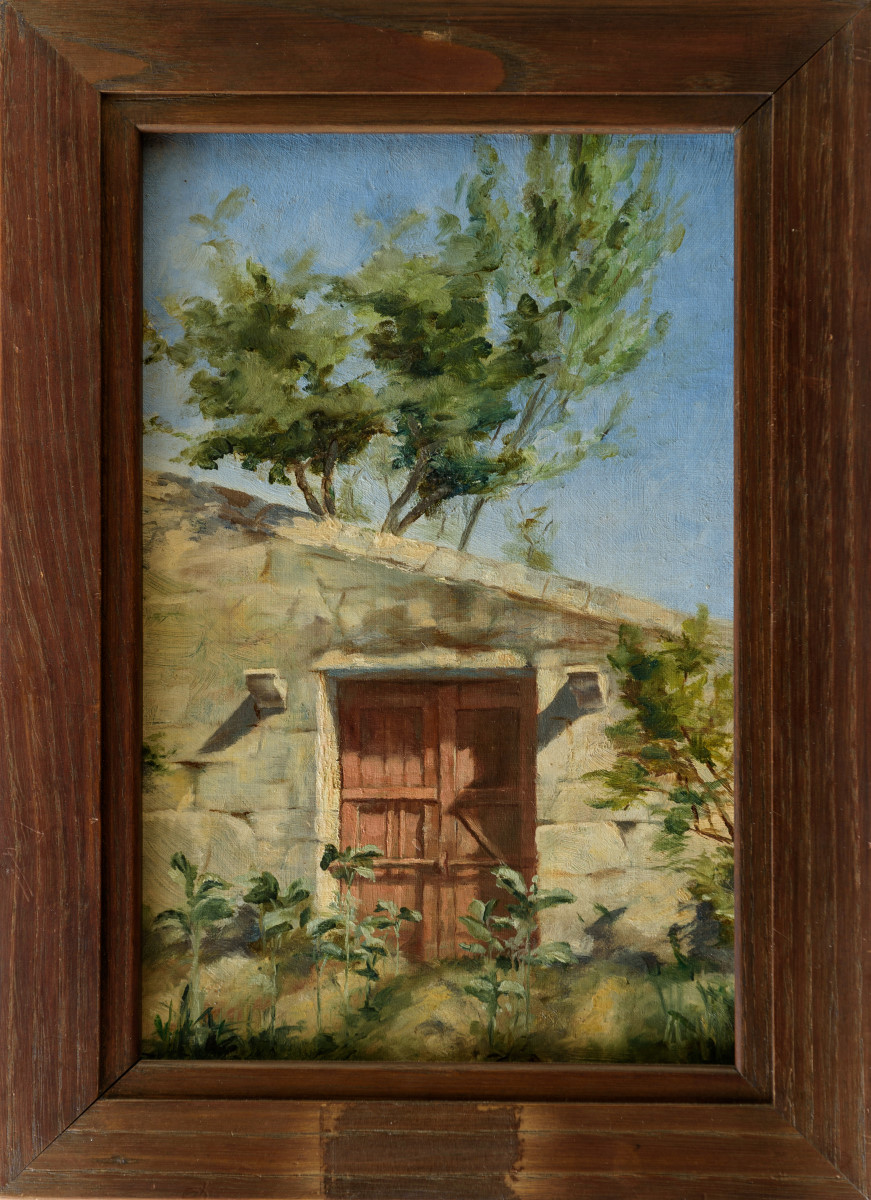
Gate of Quinta da China

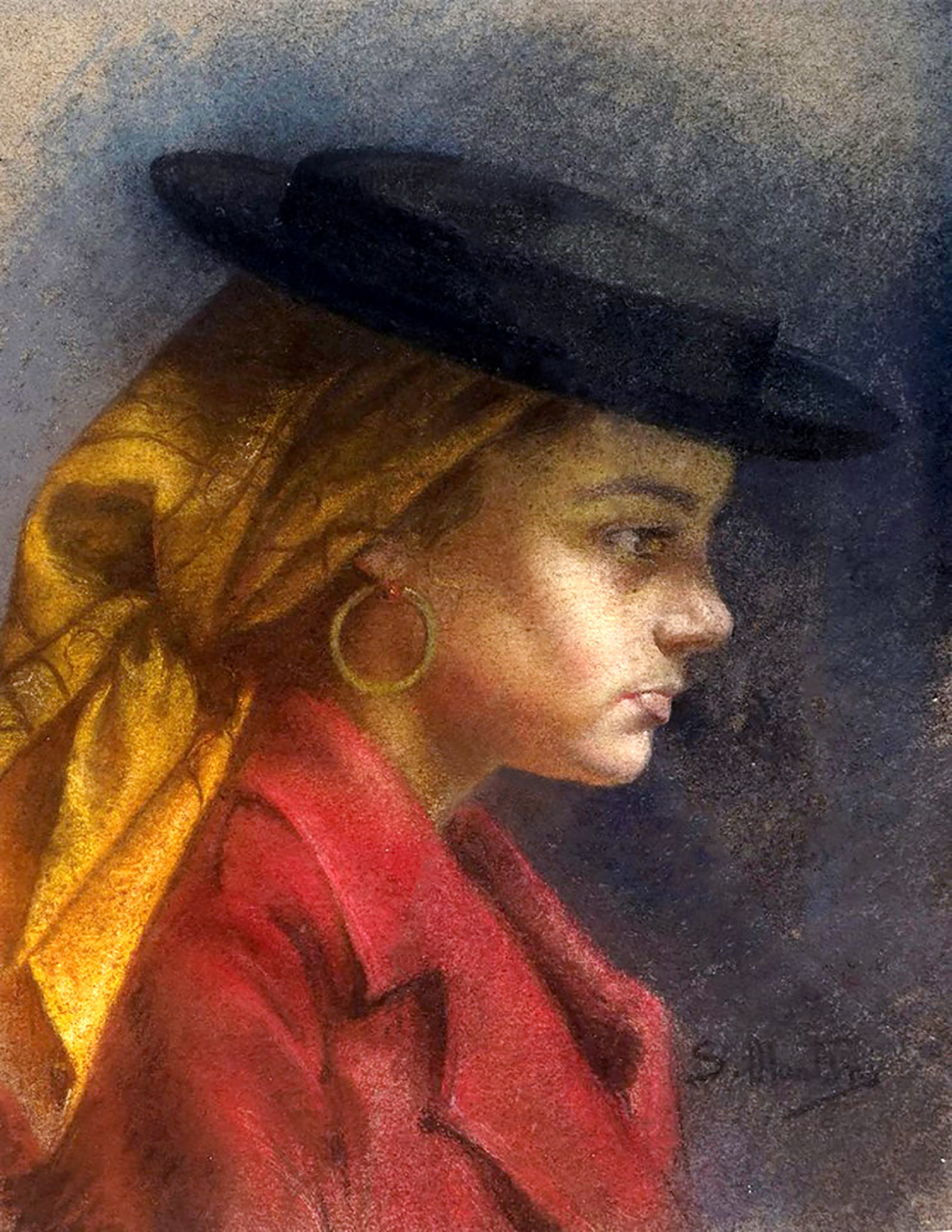
The Girl of Avintes

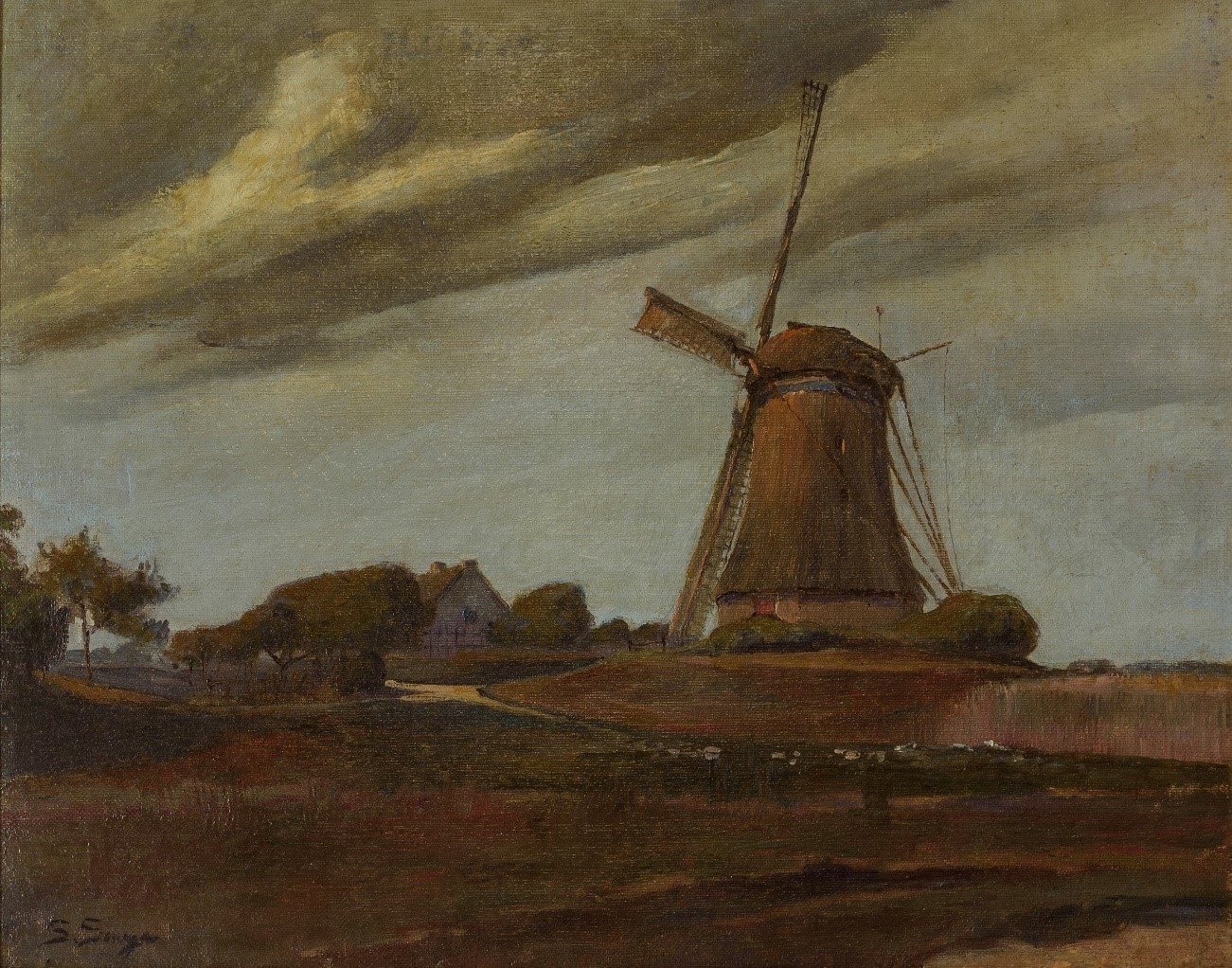
Windmill in the Netherlands
