= Caldo galego =

Soup dish from Galicia, Spain

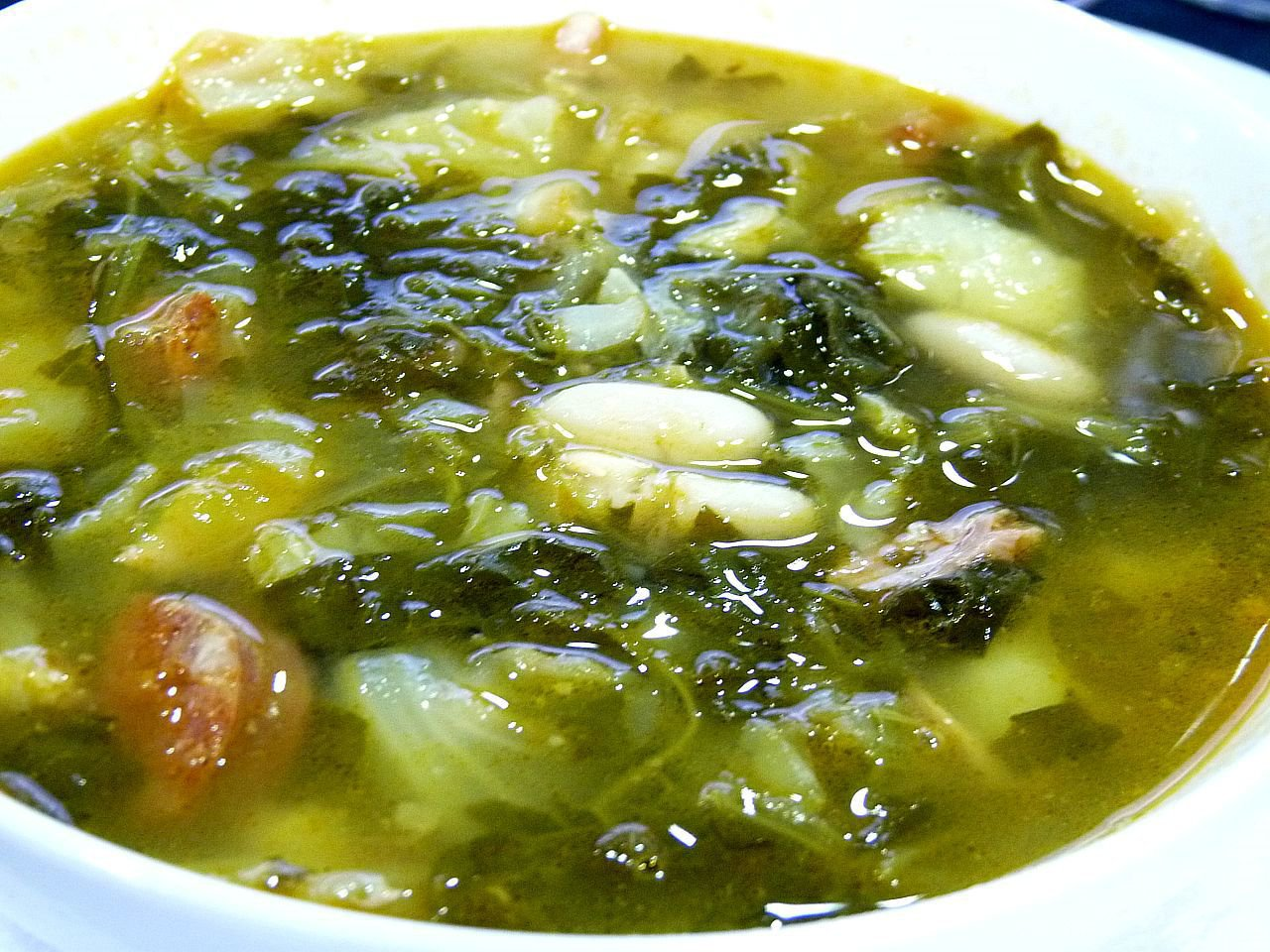
- Alternative names: Caldo; Galician broth
- Type: Soup
- Place of origin: Spain
- Region or state: Galicia
- Created by: Traditional
- Serving temperature: Hot
- Main ingredients: Cabbage or other greens, potatoes, white beans, fatty pork

Caldo galego or simply caldo (in Galician), also known as caldo gallego (in Spanish), meaning literally "Galician broth", is a traditional soup dish from Galicia. It is essentially a regional derivative (with added beans and turnip greens) of the very similar caldo verde, the traditional soup dish of neighbouring Portugal.

Ingredients include repolo (cabbage), verzas (collard greens), grelos (rapini), or navizas (sweet turnip greens); potatoes; white beans; and unto (lard). Additionally it can contain fatty pork, chorizo, ham, or bacon (compango).

It is served hot as a starter, often as part of almuerzo (lunch), and sometimes dinner. Traditionally it was usually served in cuncas (earthen bowls).

== Variations ==
Depending on the availability of seasonal ingredients there are several variations:

- Caldo branco includes chickpeas and beans.
- Caldo chirlo or vigueiro
- Caldo de castañas uses chestnuts

== See also ==
- Cabbage soup
- Caldo verde
- List of soups
- Shchi
