= Caldo verde =

Portuguese soup

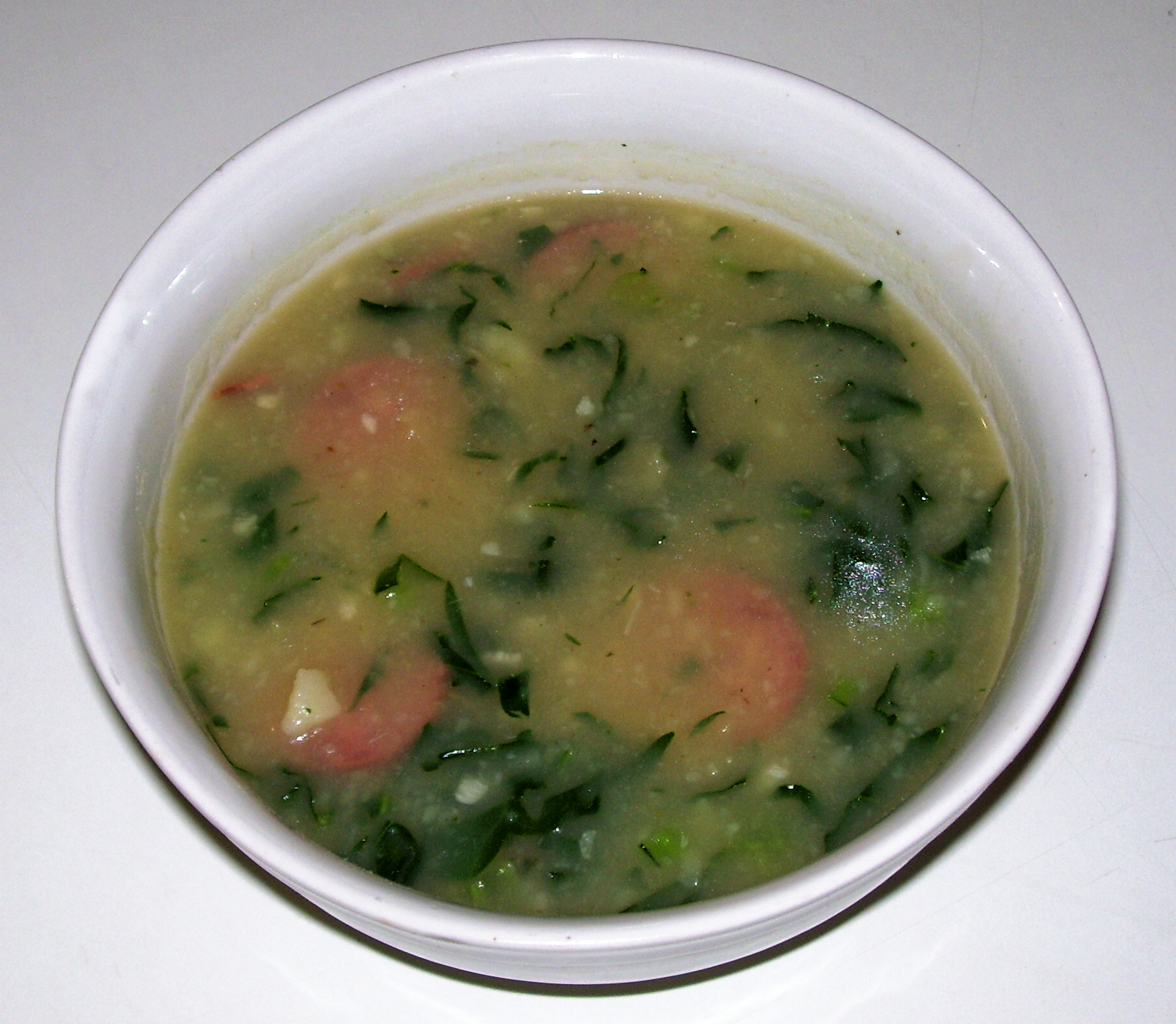
- Type: Soup
- Place of origin: Portugal
- Region or state: Minho Province
- Main ingredients: Portuguese cabbage, potatoes

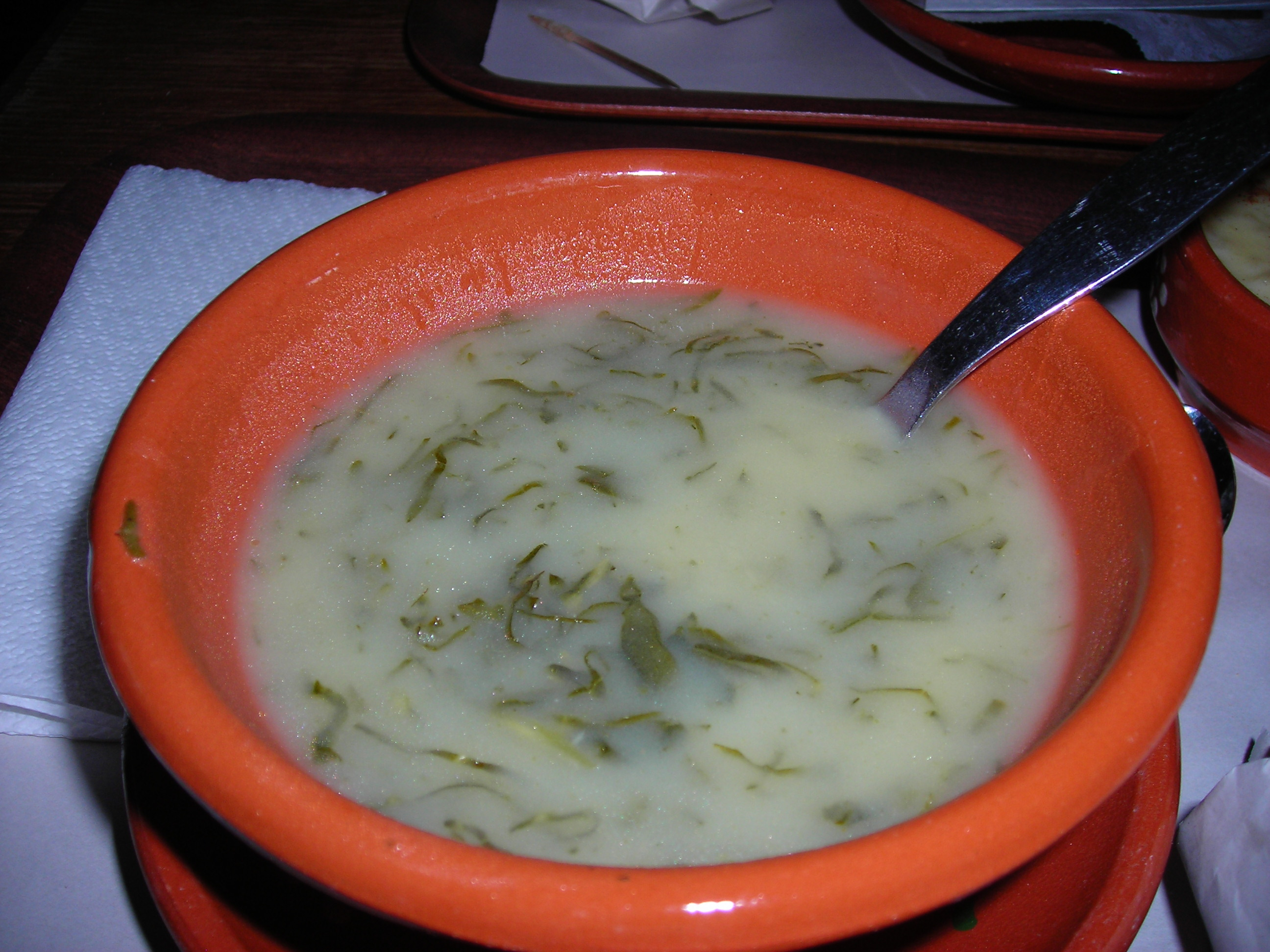
Traditional caldo verde

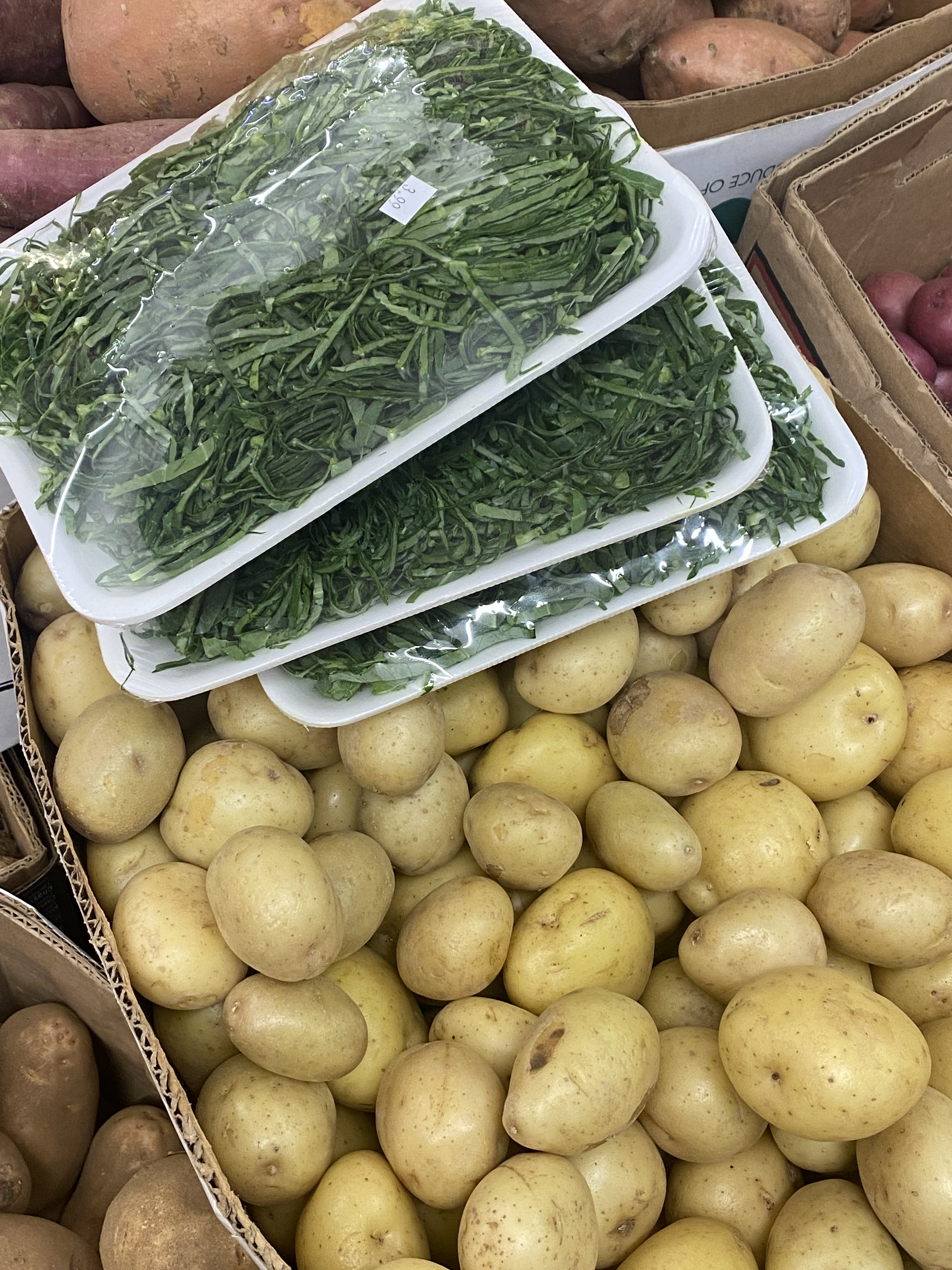
Two of the main ingredients arranged next to each other at a grocery store in Little Portugal, Toronto. The greens have been julienned specifically for the preparation of caldo verde.

Caldo verde (pronounced [ˈkaɫdu ˈveɾðɨ], Portuguese for "green broth") is a popular soup in Portuguese cuisine.

The basic traditional ingredients for caldo verde are julienned Portuguese cabbage or couve-galega (Note: A cultivar of collard greens) (or alternatively other leafy greens such as kale or mustard greens), potatoes, olive oil, black pepper and salt, mainly flavoured with onion and garlic. Some regional recipes favour slight variations, like turnip greens or added meat, such as ham hock, making it similar to Italo-American wedding soup. Traditionally, the soup is accompanied by slices of paio, chouriço or linguiça (boiled whole with the potatoes, then sliced and added to the finished soup when serving) and with a Portuguese cornbread or rye bread called broa on the side for dipping. In Brazil, the soup is accompanied by pão francês, as are virtually all kinds of soups. In Portugal, caldo verde is typically consumed during events such as weddings, birthdays and popular celebrations. It is sometimes consumed before a main course or as a late supper. It is traditionally served in earthenware bowls called tigela.

== History ==
Caldo verde originated from the Minho Province in northern Portugal, based on an earlier recipe brought to Portugal by English merchants. Today, it is a traditional favourite nationwide and abroad, particularly in significant communities of Portuguese descent found in locations like Argentina, Brazil, France, Goa, South Africa, Macau, Massachusetts, New Jersey, Rhode Island, and Toronto. References to the soup appear in many novels by Camilo Castelo Branco. In 2011, following the result of a public vote, the soup was announced as one of Portugal's Seven Wonders of Gastronomy, highlighting both its popularity and heritage in Portugal. In neighboring Galicia (historically and culturally close to Portugal) a similar dish, caldo galego is also a culinary tradition.

== See also ==
- Caldo galego
- Colcannon
- List of soups
- Rumbledethumps
- Shchi
- Stamppot
