= Castanyada =

Traditional Iberian Peninsula festival

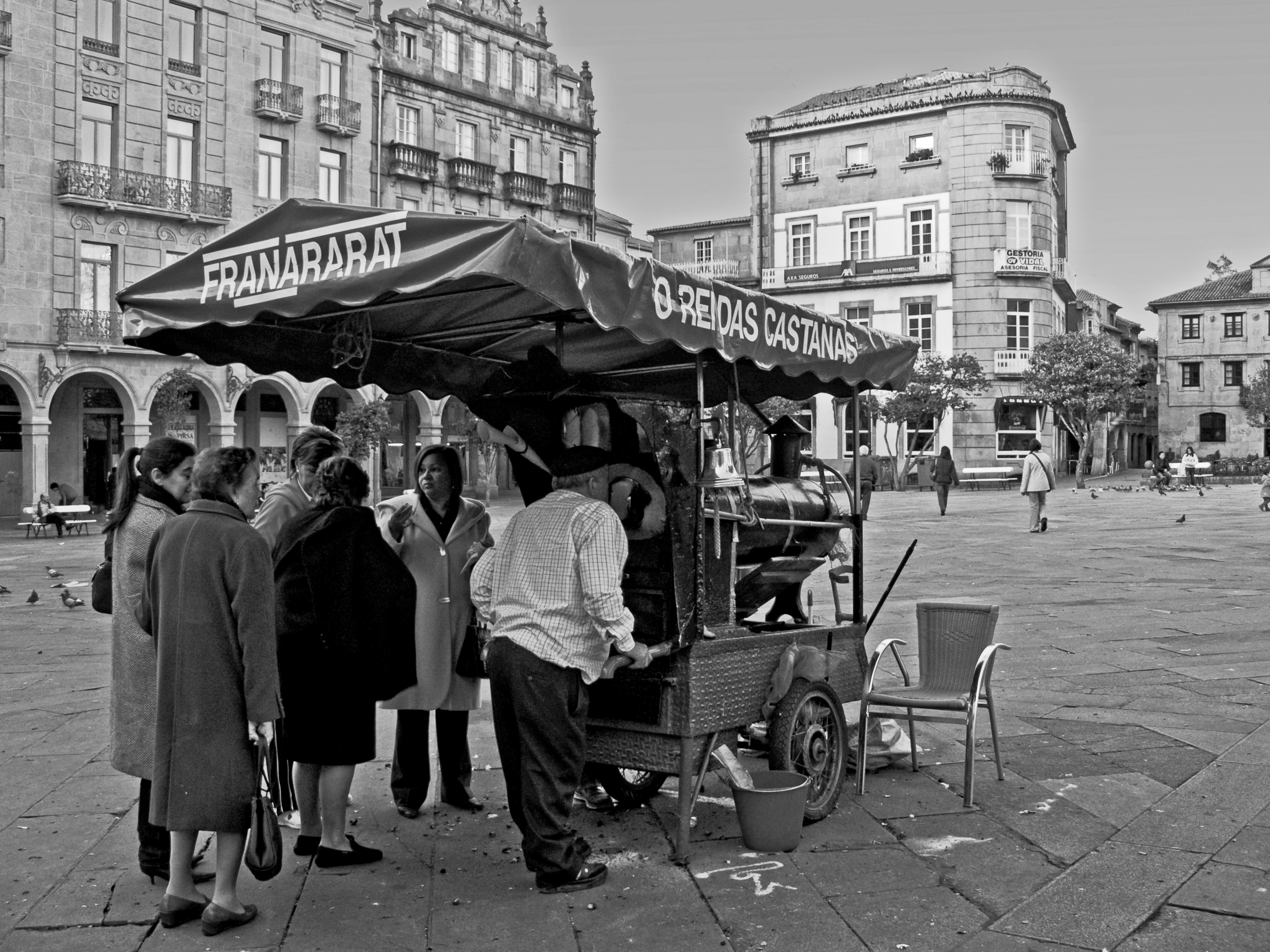
Castañada in the Plaza de la Herrería in Pontevedra

Magusto, Magosto, Magosta, Castanyada, or Festa da castanha (English: Chestnut festival) is a traditional festival in the Iberian Peninsula. It is popular in Portugal, Galicia and some areas of northern Spain, such as Cantabria, Asturias, Catalonia, and the provinces of León, Zamora and Salamanca and Cáceres, but also in some parts of the Canary Islands. The festival is also celebrated in both sides of the French-Spanish border. It has also spread internationally as a 'chestnut party'. Etymological origins are unknown, but there are several theories for the Magosto name: Magnus Ustus (great fire) or Magum Ustum (highlighting the magical character of fire).

It is believed to have Celtic roots, similar to the Samhain festival that celebrates the end of summer and the beginning of winter. In all the regions where it is celebrated, and especially in Galicia and Portugal, it is deeply related to the cult of the dead. It is customary to leave the fire of the house lit and place food around the fireplace to welcome back the spirits deceased members of the family. Numerous traditional rituals are celebrated throughout this feast related to purification, healing, remembering ancestors, attending mass or visiting the local healer.

== Portugal and Galicia ==
The "Magusto", "Magosto", or "Festa da castanha" is the essential Portuguese and Galician autumn pagan origin festival similar to the Gaelic Samhain (or "Samaín" word adapted to the Galician from the Irish Gaelic).

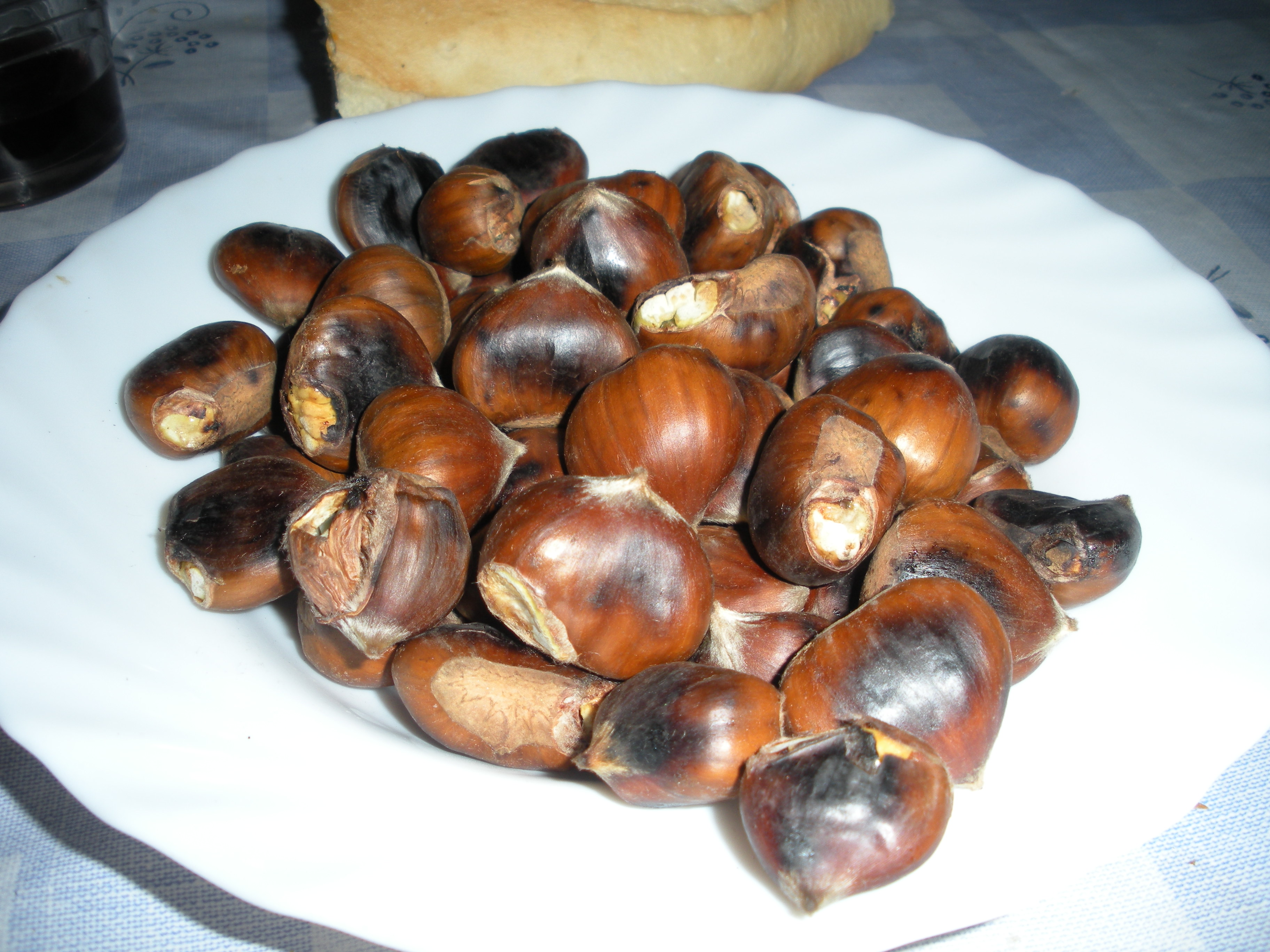
roasted chestnuts, part of the Magusto festival

In addition to chestnuts and local young wine, various foods have been incorporated such as sausages and other products made from the pig slaughter, which occurs at the same time of year. Traditionally, grilled sardines are also served, a great delicacy in this region.

Chestnut festival is traditionally celebrated in the same grove (souto), starting early in the afternoon to collect firewood and chestnuts. One or more bonfires are lit with sticks and pine needles. Young people take to the streets. It was customary for the girls to bring the chestnuts, and for the boys to bring the wine. Chestnuts are roasted on the floor, directly in the fire. Children play and are donned with soot and ash. The adults dance and sing, jumping over the remains of the fire.

In the case of Ourense, the festival is celebrated coinciding with the festivity of its patron, St. Martin of Tours, on November 11 known as St. Martin's Day. It is a widespread custom to go to a nearby mountain (in the case of the city one of the most used for this purpose is Monte Alegre) and light a bonfire in which the pork, sausages and chestnuts will be roasted. The occasion is used to taste the new wine of the harvest.

Throughout Portugal, the Magusto festivaltends to occur on St. Martin's Day, St. Simon's Day, and All Saints Day. A popular saying in Portugal attests to the ancient tradition of Magusto "No dia de São Martinho, comem-se castanhas e prova-se o vinho" (On St Martin's Day you eat chestnuts and drink wine).

== Catalonia ==
In Catalonia, celebrations involve eating castanyes (roasted chestnuts), panellets (special almond balls covered in pine nuts), moniatos (roast or baked sweet potato), Ossos de Sant cake and preserved fruit (candied or glazed fruit). Moscatell (Muscat) is drunk from porrons. Around the time of this celebration, it is common for street vendors to sell hot toasted chestnuts wrapped in newspaper. In many places, confectioners often organise raffles of chestnuts and preserved fruit.

It seems that the tradition of eating these foods comes from the fact that during All Saints' night, on the eve of All Souls' Day in the Christian tradition, bell ringers would ring bells in commemoration of the dead into the early morning. Friends and relatives would help with this task, and everyone would eat these foods for sustenance.

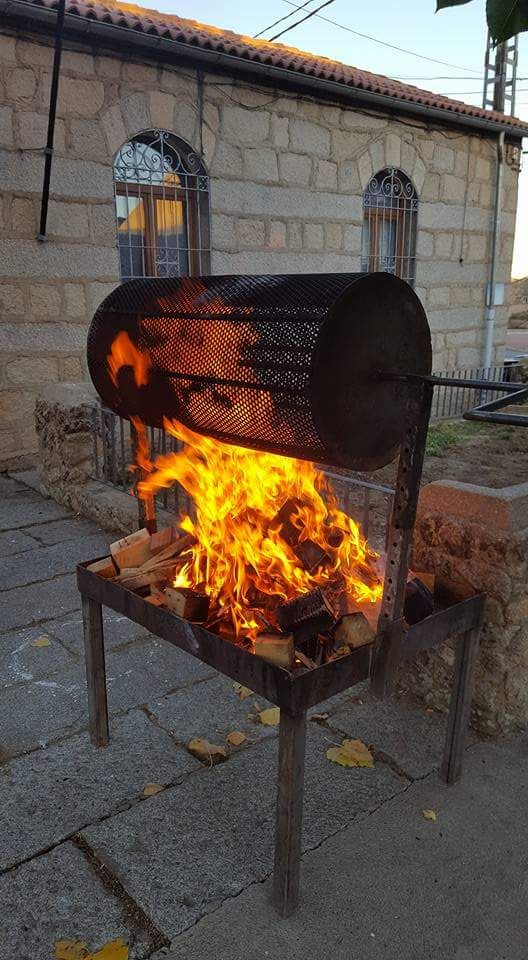
Roasted chestnut of All Saints' Day, a likely origin for the chestnut basis of this holiday

Other versions of the story state that the Castanyada originates at the end of the 18th century and comes from the old funeral meals, where other foods, such as vegetables and dried fruit were not served. The meal had the symbolic significance of a communion with the souls of the departed: while the chestnuts were roasting, prayers would be said for the person who had just died.

The festival is usually depicted with the figure of a castanyera: an old lady, dressed in peasant's clothing and wearing a headscarf, sitting behind a table, roasting chestnuts for street sale. La Castanyera is a popular folkloric character associated with a traditional song. She is typically depicted as an elderly woman wearing a headscarf and a long skirt. In modern popular culture, she is sometimes depicted accompanied by a cat named Marrameu. The character of Marrameu is mentioned in at least one folk song dating from 1917 that remains popular today. In the song, Marrameu dies while attempting to roast chestnuts.

In recent years, the Castanyada has become a revetlla of All Saints and is celebrated in the home and community. It is the first of the four main school festivals, alongside Christmas, Carnestoltes and St George's Day, without reference to ritual or commemoration of the dead.
