= Leeuw =

Leeuw is Dutch for lion. It occurs as a surname, most commonly in the form of De Leeuw ("the lion"; 9,814 people in the Netherlands in 2007 and 2,211 in Belgium in 1998). "De Leeuw", “Leeuw” (873 & 34 people) and Van der Leeuw (765 & 9 people) are thought to mostly be toponymic surnames, with the first bearers named "(from) the Lion" after a house, windmill or farm with that name. The more common surname Van Leeuwen has a distinct origin in the small town of Leeuwen and perhaps in the city of Leuven.

== Places ==
- Leeuwen
- Denderleeuw
- Zoutleeuw
- Sint-Pieters-Leeuw

== People ==
People with these surnames include:

Leeuw

- Clinton Leeuw (born 1982), South African squash player
- Reginald Leeuw (fl. 2015), South African Anglican Dean

De Leeuw / DeLeeuw

- Adele DeLeeuw (1899–1988), American writer of Dutch-themed children's stories
- Bas de Leeuw (b. 1959), Dutch sustainability expert
- Dan DeLeeuw (fl. 1993–2015), American (?) visual effects artist
- Dianne de Leeuw (b. 1955), Dutch figure skater
- Eddy De Leeuw (1956–2015), Belgian sprinter
- Edith de Leeuw (b. 1962), Dutch psychologist
- Gerry DeLeeuw (1926–2014), Canadian football player
- Jan de Leeuw, 15th-century Flemish goldsmith, portrayed by Jan van Eyck
- Jan de Leeuw (b. 1945), Dutch statistician
- Jan De Leeuw (born 1968), Flemish children's book writer and psychologist
- Johanna de Leeuw (b. 1932), Dutch-born American writer
- Karel de Leeuw (1930–1978), American mathematician
- Lisa De Leeuw (b. 1958), American porn actress
- Marcel Deleeuw (born 1943), Dutch-born Canadian football player
- Marine Deleeuw (b. 1994), French fashion model
- Melvin de Leeuw (b. 1988), Dutch footballer
- Michael de Leeuw (b. 1986), Dutch footballer
- Mineke de Leeuw (b. 1938), Dutch author
- Nata De Leeuw (b. 1991), Canadian ski jumper
- Paul de Leeuw (b. 1962), Dutch television comedian, singer and actor
- Puck de Leeuw (1953–2002), Dutch documentary filmmaker
- Reinbert de Leeuw (1938–2020), Dutch conductor, pianist and composer
- Sabrina De Leeuw (b. 1974), Belgian high jumper
- Sarah de Leeuw (b. 1973), Canadian writer
- Thomas de Leeuw (1560–1612), French engraver of Flemish origin
- Ton de Leeuw (1926–1996), Dutch composer
- Ton de Leeuw (born 1941), organizational theorist

Van Leeuw

- Philippe Van Leeuw (born 1954), Belgian film director, screenwriter and cinematographer

Van der Leeuw

- Aart van der Leeuw (1876–1931), Dutch author and poet
- Bastiaan Govertsz van der Leeuw (1624–1680), Dutch landscape painter
- Caroline van der Leeuw (b. 1981), Dutch jazz singer
- Cees van der Leeuw (1890–1973), Dutch industrialist and psychiatrist
- Charles van der Leeuw (b. 1952), Dutch journalist and author
- Gerard van der Leeuw (1890–1950), Dutch historian and philosopher of religion
- Govert van der Leeuw (1645–1688), Dutch landscape painter, son of Bastiaan
- Joke van der Leeuw-Roord (born 1949), Dutch historian
- Koos van der Leeuw (1893–1934), Dutch theosophist and author
- Marcellino van der Leeuw (b. 1990), Dutch footballer
- Pieter van der Leeuw (1647–1679), Dutch landscape painter, son of Bastiaan

Fictional characters

- Loeki de Leeuw, a lion puppet featured before and after advertisement blocks on Dutch television between 1972 and 2004.

== See also ==
- De Vlaamse Leeuw, the official anthem of Flanders
