= Limburgian cuisine =

Culinary traditions of Limburg

Limburgisch cuisine, the cuisine of the Province of Limburg, is different from the Belgian and Dutch cuisines but also shares many similarities with these cuisines. Maastricht is known for its Limburgian cuisine.

Limburg is a little different compared to the rest of the Dutch and Belgian provinces. The landscape is hilly in the southeast (while the rest of the Dutch landscape is cultivated and flat) and the Limburgish language could be said to be a separate language rather than a dialect of Dutch. This different landscape provides the Limburgish cuisine with a lot of game meat, especially in the hunting season. The north of the Limburg is quite flat and is the largest asparagus producing area of the Netherlands. In the southwest is found the Haspengouw which is famous for being the fruit basket of Belgium.

== Origins of differences ==
Limburgian cuisine is shaped by the practice of fishing on its rivers (most notably the Meuse) and its farming. Limburg is also renowned for its varieties of cheese, most notably the Limburger cheese. Limburgian cuisine has often been called a Burgundian cuisine; this means that along with big portions and a certain unpretentiousness of presentation, the diner can expect a high standard of ingredients and preparation.

Other Limburgian specialities are beer and Jenever. Hasselt, the capital of Belgian Limburg, is home to the National Jenever Museum. For a comparatively small region, Limburg produces a very large number of beers in a range of different styles. Almost every style of beer has its own particular, uniquely shaped glass or other drinking-vessel. The recipes for a number of home- and restaurant-prepared dishes call for the inclusion of one or other of the region's beers. Limburg has many brands of beer. Some breweries in Limburg are Alken-Maes, Lindeboom, Brand, Gulpener, Christoffel, Leeuw, Hertog Jan and Alfa. Many of these breweries use water from the Meuse River, which flows through the entire length of the region. Gulpener and Alfa, however, use their own wells in the hilly southeast of the region. Achel brewery or Brouwerij der Sint-Benedictusabdij de Achelse Kluis is a Limburgian Trappist brewery, and the smallest of the seven currently approved Trappist breweries. It is located in the Abbey of Saint Benedict in the Belgian municipality of Achel. It brews five kinds of Trappist beers.

== Typical dishes ==
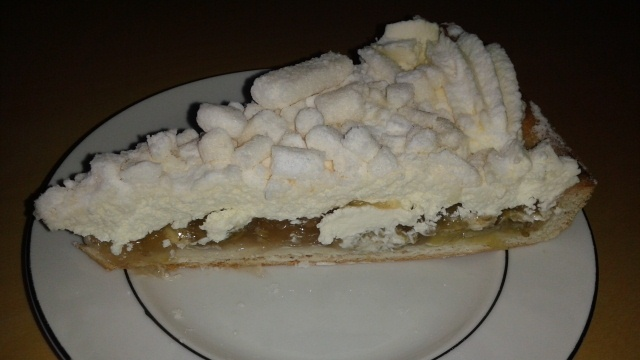
Real Limburgian gooseberry vlaai with meringue

- Deep-fried chipped potatoes are a very popular food item. They are called written in Limburgisch. However, unlike the 6–10 mm thick "French fries" which are normally served in American fast-food restaurants, Limburgian fries are more substantial (12–15 mm thick) and are typically fried in suet (preferably ox), similar to Belgian fries.
- Konijn in beer/lapin à la bière: rabbit in beer, usually a spontaneously fermented, sour beer.
- The most famous dish from Limburg is vlaai, a large round pie that comes in many varieties, most commonly with a fruit filling. It is so characteristic for the province that the common name for vlaai is Limburgse vlaai.
- Beef is the most used meat in Limburg. A popular Limburgish beef dish is Tête de veaux, beef with mushrooms and a tomato based sauce.
- Mestreechter stroeap (a thick, dark brown sugar syrup made from pears and apples).
- In Limburg the asparagus is so popular in the spring season that it is also called queen of vegetables. Asparagus are traditionally eaten with ham, hard boiled eggs, boiled potatoes and sauce of molten butter.
- Limburger is a cheese that originated in the historical Duchy of Limburg, which is now divided between modern-day Netherlands, Belgium, and Germany. Limburger is especially known for its pungent odor. The bacterium used to ferment Limburger cheese and other rind-washed cheeses is Brevibacterium linens; this same bacterium is found on human skin and is partially responsible for human body odor. Herve cheese is a particular kind of Limburger produced in the Land of Herve. Platters of these cheeses are "perfectly paired with tangy Kriek ale, made from cherries grown in the area’s famous fruit orchards."
- In Limburg nonnevotte are sometimes served during New Year's Eve, although it is mostly eaten during Carnaval. Nonnevotte (literally nun's arses) are a kind of round doughnuts.
- Fries are usually ordered with the traditional Limburgian dish zoervleis, a type of sweet and sour stew (traditionally horse meat, now sometimes cow meat).
- Head cheese is known under several regional names and variations. In Dutch it is called hoofdkaas meaning headcheese while in Limburgisch it is called gekrusj or zult, and is eaten on bread or with Limburgian sausage as a starter. There's a red, sweet variety and a slightly sour, grey variety. The red one can be compared to Brabantic zult. Sülze and Presskopf are also found in Limburg though the Sülze is less sour whereas the Presskopf often contains black pepper and is eaten on wholewheat bread. In Belgian Limburg, head cheese is also called kop or kopvlees, which translates as meat from the head.
- Balkenbrij is made of stock left over from the making of sausages like liverwurst, boiled with flour (and sometimes blood, which turns the color from white to black) and bacon and mainly other various cuts of the animal like liver, kidney and lungs, all of which are cooked, ground, then cooked again with flour or oatmeal and a special spice mix ("rommelkruid") consisting of liquorice, sugar, anis, cinnamon, clove, white pepper, mace, ginger powder and sandalwood, and finally poured into a bowl and cooled off to achieve the form of a loaf. The cuts of the loaf (about 1 cm thick) are covered in flour and fried. There are as many recipes as there are Limburgian regions. Balkenbrij is technically a relative of the American scrapple and a distant relative of the English black pudding and Scottish Haggis.
