= Daniela Merolla =

American anthropologist (born 1960)

Daniela Merolla (born 1960) is a Professor in Amazigh / Berber Literature and Art at the INALCO, Institut National des Langues et Civilisations Orientales (Sorbonne Paris-Cité). Her work investigates intertextuality and multilingualism in African oral and written literatures, cinema, and websites. She developed the notion of “Amazigh/Berber literary space”.

== Biography ==
After graduating at the University of Rome “La Sapienza” in history of religions and cultural anthropology, Daniela Merolla received her doctorate in comparative literature from Leiden University in the Netherlands and her “habilitation à diriger des recherches” at Aix-Marseille University in France. She attended courses in Berber language, literature and linguistics at the University of Naples "L'Orientale" in Italy and at the INALCO (Berber Research Centre) in France. Her research included fieldwork in the Aurès and in Kabylia (Algeria), in the Rif and in the Sous (Morocco), as well as in migrant environments in France and in the Netherlands. Until 2015 she taught and did research in African Literatures and Media at Leiden University.

== Verba Africana series ==
Merolla established the audiovisual series on oral performances Verba Africana thanks to an international network of researchers and universities and in cooperation with the World Oral Literature Project.

== Publications (selection) ==
- “Amazigh/Berber Literature and ‘Literary Space’. A contested minority situation in (North) African literatures.” In Routledge Handbook of Minority Discourses in African Literature, Routledge, 2020, edited by Tanure Ojaide and Joyce Ashuntantang, pp. 27-47.
- “Cultural heritage, artistic innovation, and activism on Amazigh Berber websites.” Journal of African Cultural Studies, 32:1, 42-59.
- Afrikaanse letterkunde: tradities, genres, auteurs en ontwikkelingen (African literatures: traditions, genres, authors and developments), Amsterdam University Press, 2019, with Mineke Schipper (first author) and Inge Brinkman.
- Les cinémas berbères. De la méconnaissance aux festivals internationaux. Karthala, 2019, edited with Kamal Naït Zerad and Amar Ameziane.
- Searching for Sharing: Heritage and Multimedia in Africa. Open Book Publishers, 2017, edited with Mark Turin. Open Source http://www.openbookpublishers.com/product/590
- «Au-delà des ‘deux Afriques’ au nord et au sud du Sahara: les études littéraires berbères dans le cadre des études africaines». Etudes et Documents Berbères, 2017(38), pp. 71-90.
- «Rif: littérature». Encyclopédie Berbère, 2017 (51), pp. 6956-6972.
- “Orality and Technauriture of African Literatures” (edited special section), Tydsckrif vir Letterkunde (S.A.), 51, 1, 2014: 79 – 174.
- Transcultural Modernities: Narrating Africa in Europe. Brill, 2009, edited with Elizabeth Bekers and Sissy Helff.
- De l’art de la narration tamazight / berbère. Deux cents ans de collecte et de recherche dans les études littéraire berbères. Peeters, 2006.
- Migrant Cartographies. New Cultural and Literary Spaces in Post-colonial Europe. Lexington Books, 2005, edited with Sandra Ponzanesi.
- Les contes berbères chaouis d’après Gustave Mercier. Rüdiger Köppe Verlag, 2002, with Mena Lafkioui.
- Gender and Community in the Kabyle Literary Space. Cultural strategies in the Oral and in the Written. CNWS Publications, 1996.
