= Van Leeuwen =

Van Leeuwen may refer to:

- Van Leeuwen (surname), a Dutch surname
- Van Leeuwen Ice Cream, an American ice cream parlor chain
- Van Leeuwen Pipe and Tube Group, a Dutch steel distributor
- Bohr–Van Leeuwen theorem, a physics theorem
- Robbie van Leeuwen, a Dutch jazz musician
