= Pig slaughter =

Pig's slaughtering process

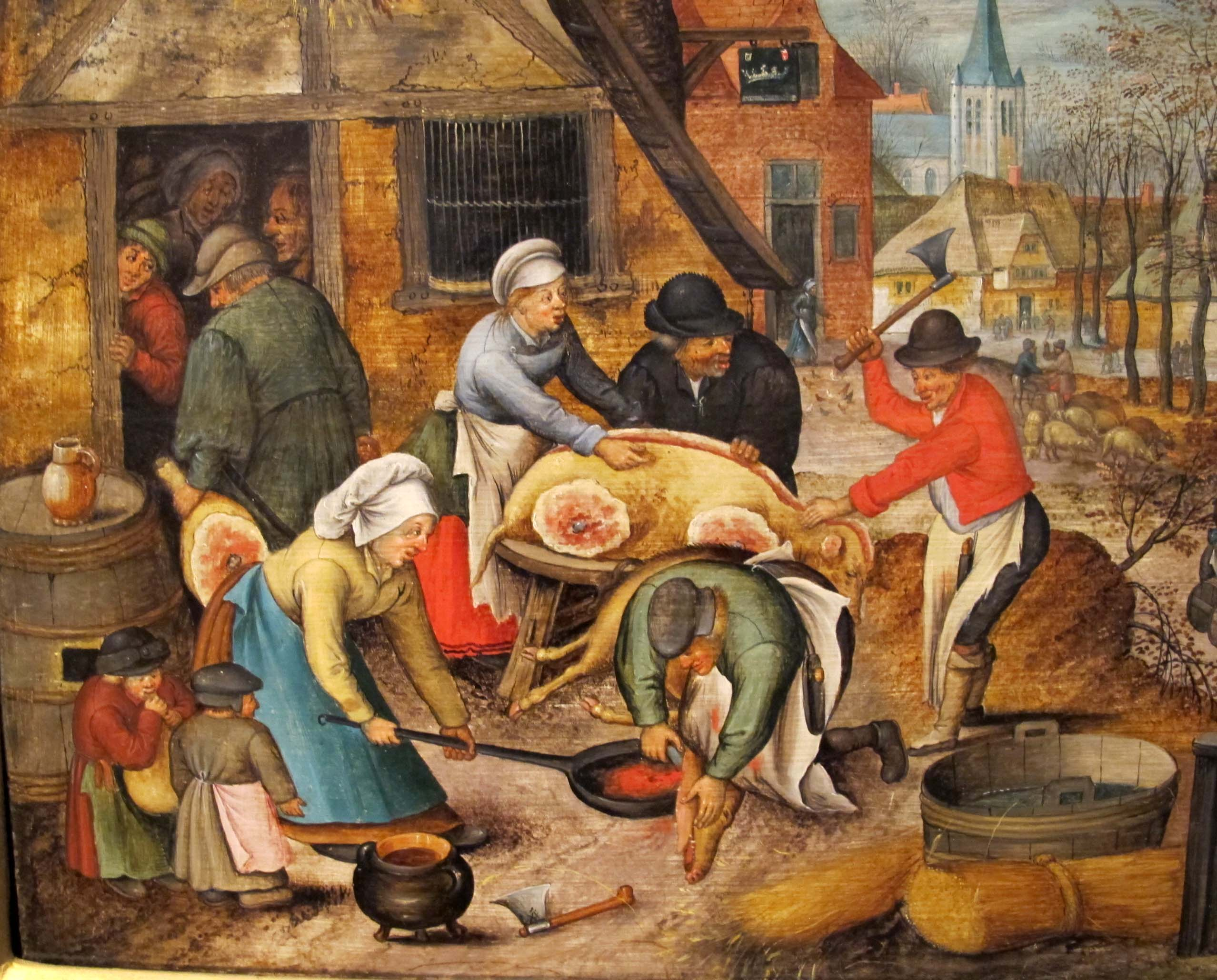
Peasants slaughtering a pig, by Flemish artist Pieter Brueghel, after 1616

Pig slaughter is the work of slaughtering domestic pigs for their meat. It regularly happens as part of traditional and intensive pig farming, which is both a common economic activity as well as a traditional feast in some European and Asian countries.

== Agriculture ==
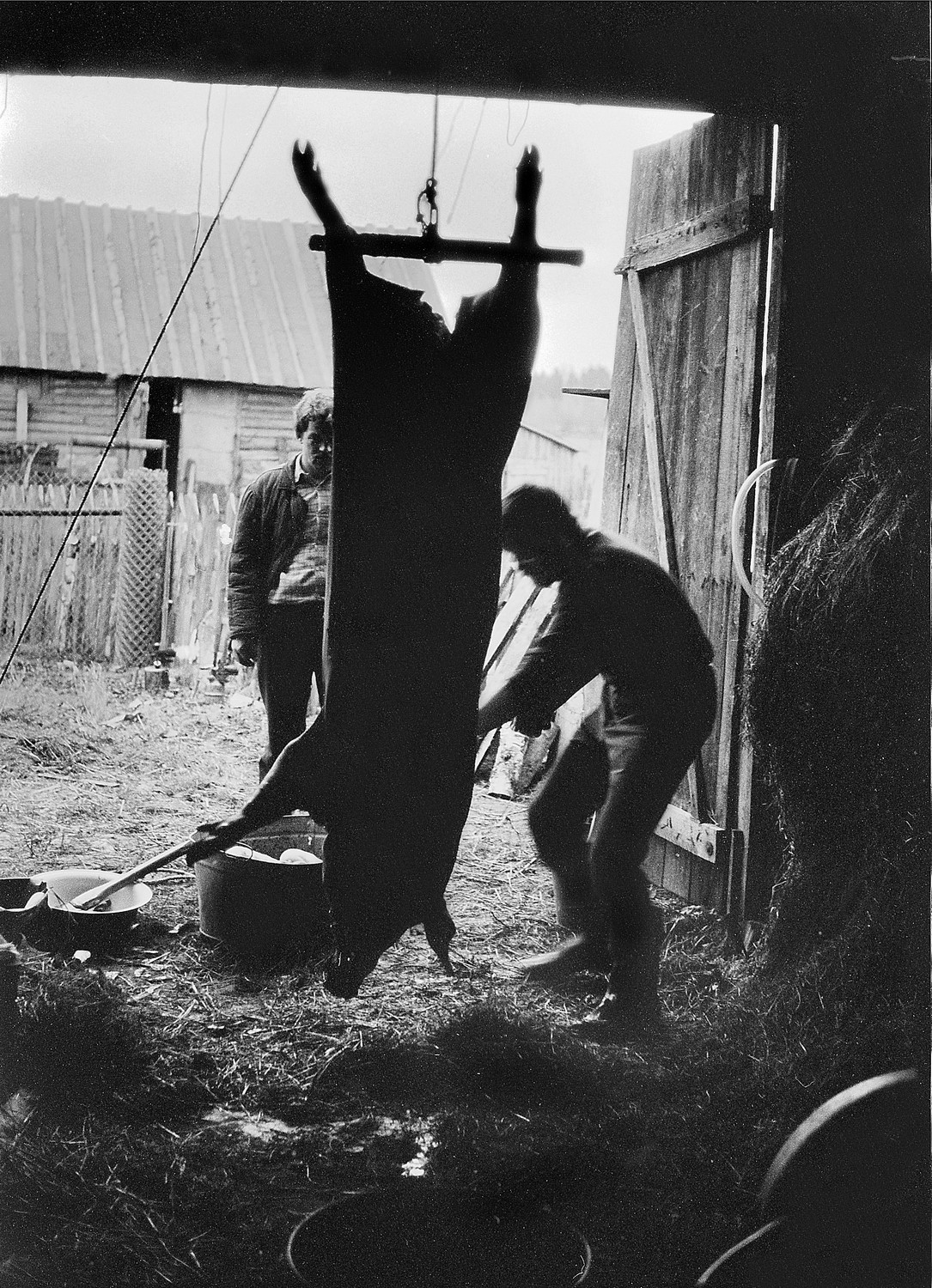
Pig butchering in Estonia in 1983. Photo by Jaan Künnap

Pigs are slaughtered at different ages. Generally they can be divided into piglets, which are 1.5 to 3 months old; the fattening pigs, intended for pork and bacon, which are 4 months to one year old; and finally the older pigs, such as sows (female pigs) and boars (uncastrated male pigs). The meat obtained from piglets is subdivided into more meaty or more fatty, determined by the thickness of bacon. Male hogs are usually castrated a month before slaughter. Their meat quality is determined on the mass of halves and the thickness of bacon on the back.

The Humane Slaughter Association states that the transport of pigs to slaughter and all the other procedures and circumstances leading up to the actual act of stunning and killing the pig are, in modern times, often carefully arranged in order to avoid excessive suffering of animals, which both has a humane rationale as well as helping provide for a higher quality of meat. Animal rights groups have recorded images of pigs being transported to slaughter in cramped and unhygienic conditions. They state that the transportation does cause suffering, which has economic rationale. Research also confirms stunning of pigs in CO_{2} gas chambers in particular has animal welfare concerns, as the high concentrations of CO_{2} used are highly aversive to pigs.

Typically, pigs are first rendered unconscious using one of the following means: stunning using electric current applied with electrodes, or stunning using captive bolt pistol, and inhalation of high concentration CO_{2}, the last being the most common. In some cases a .22 pistol/rifle which is shot directly into the brain is used instead. The pigs are then exsanguinated, usually via the carotid artery and the jugular vein, often by hoisting them on a rail. After the blood is gone, the carcass is drenched in hot water in a device called a pig scalder which helps in the removal of hair, which is subsequently completed by using scissor-like devices and then if necessary with a torch. However, in many countries across the world, rendering the pig unconscious is not standard practice and exsanguination occurs whilst the pigs are fully conscious.

The pig is then eviscerated, the head is usually removed, and the body is cut into two halves. The remaining halves are washed to remove any remaining blood, bacteria or remnants of bone, and then cooled down in order to help with the process of cutting and deboning.

In the European Union, the Regulation (EC) of the European Parliament and of the Council No. 852/2004, 853/2004 and 854/2004 cover various aspects of hygiene of foodstuffs that includes pig slaughter.

== European tradition ==
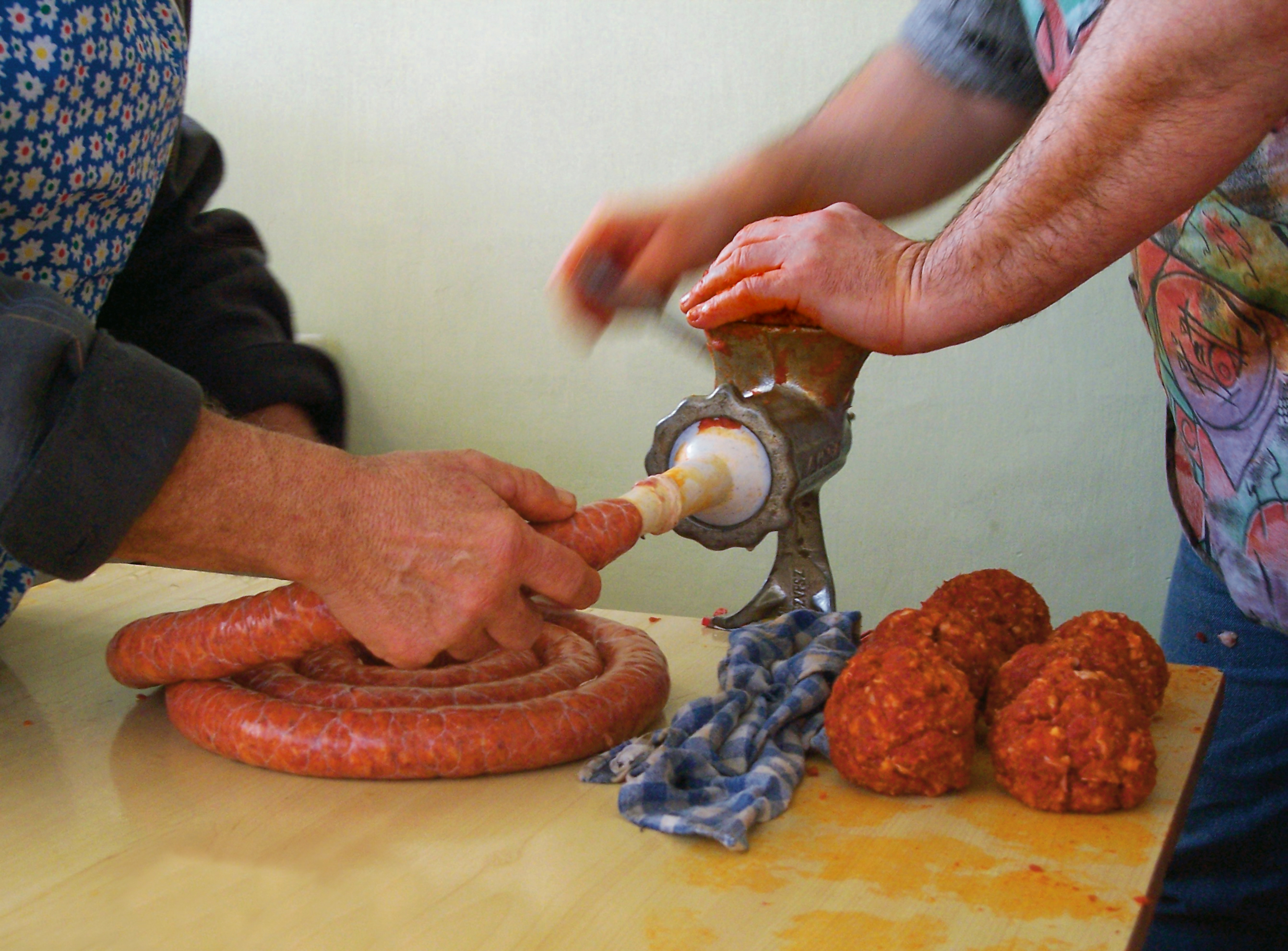
The process of making a sausage in a traditional Hungarian household

Pig slaughter is a tradition known in numerous EuropeEuropean countries and regions: Armenia (Խոզ մորթելը, Khoz mort’ely), in Albania, it is only traditional among Christians, Austria (Sautanz), Bulgaria (колене на прасе, kolene na prase), North Macedonia (колење на прасе, kolenje na prase), Croatia (kolinje), the Czech Republic (zabijačka), France (tue-cochon), Georgia (ღორის დაკვლა, ghoris dak’vla), Greece, Hungary (disznóvágás, disznótor or disznóölés), Italy (maialatura), Moldova, Montenegro (svinjokolj), Poland (świniobicie), Portugal (matança), Romania (tăiatul porcului, Ignat), Russia (Убой свиней, Uboy sviney) Serbia (svinjokolj), Slovakia (zabíjačka), Slovenia (koline), Spain (matanza), Ukraine, Corsica and others.

Family hog pens have also existed in the United States on small family farms, but have become rare in recent decades.

=== Traditional autumn activity ===
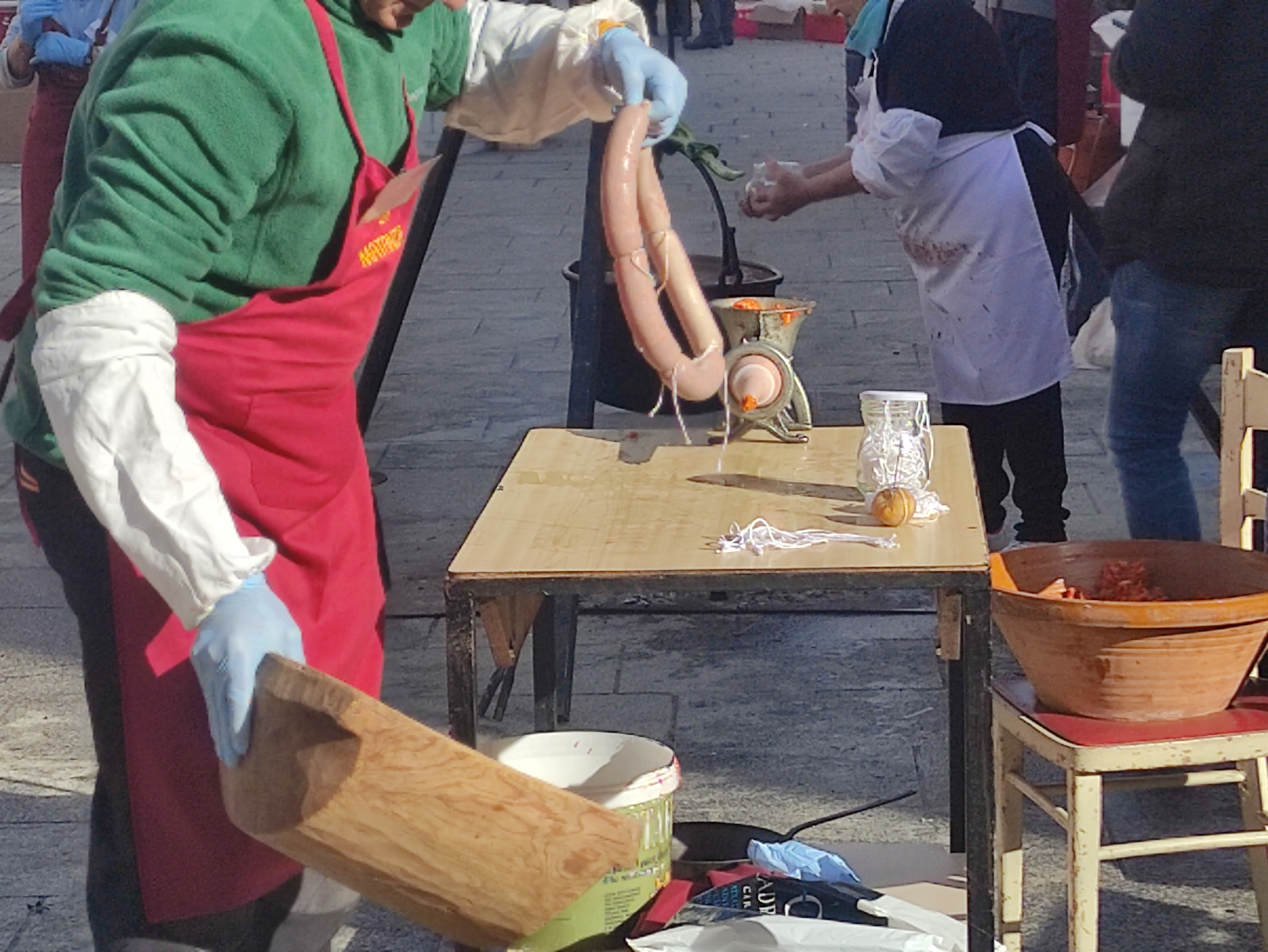
Making sausages during a Pig Slaughter, Salas de los Infantes (Spain, 2024).

The slaughter traditionally takes place in the autumn and early winter, and the timing has several practical considerations. It can start as soon as it gets cold, as the cold is required as a natural method of preserving the relatively large quantities of meat during the butchering. Yet, because people often do the work in the open, it is preferable that the temperatures aren't too much below freezing during this time, hence the slaughter rarely extends into winter. Also, slaughter activities typically need to produce results before the Christmas season, to provide for the festive cuisine.

In the past, this was also the only time of the year when people could afford to eat larger amounts of meat. In modern times, almost any family in Europe that is so inclined can afford to slaughter, yet there is also an abundance of pre-processed meat in the shops, so the traditional method of slaughtering is becoming more and more of a folk custom rather than a necessity.

The slaughter requires numerous preparations, including troughs, large quantities of boiling water, large wooden barrels for storing meat, pots, sharp knives, and in modern times also artificial intestines (hoses for various sausages).

Historically, butchering was a trade passed from father to son. Today the initial slaughter is normally performed by a professional butcher. After that, the meat is butchered by laymen, and the process is accompanied by various local rituals.

=== Act of slaughter and the butchering of carcass ===
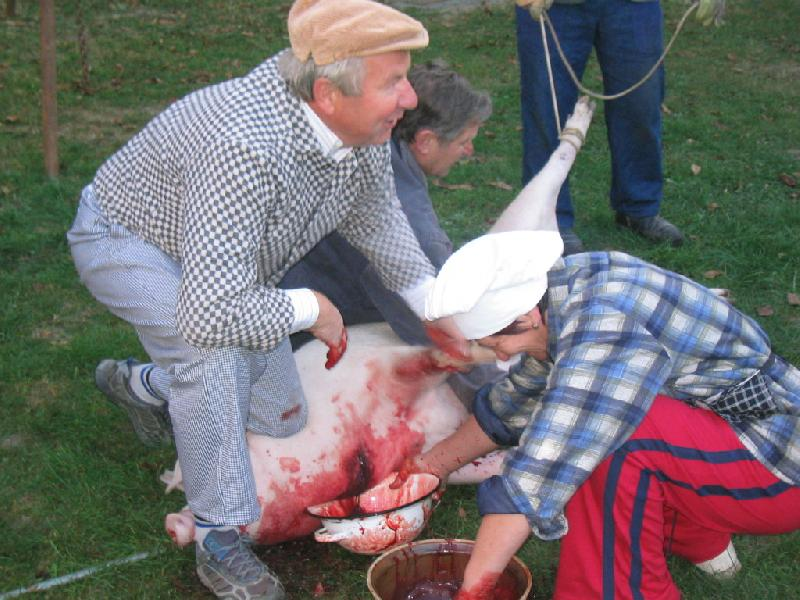
Stirring of blood in order to prevent its coagulation. Collected blood will be further used.

Traditionally, the pig is slaughtered with a knife and then put in a wooden or a metal trough and showered with hot water to remove the hair. The pig is then removed from the trough and any remaining hair is removed with a knife or a razor, and then it is again washed with hot water.

Today, the animal is rendered unconscious by electrical or carbon dioxide stunning and then immediately bled by cutting the throat. For quality reasons, mechanical means of stunning such as a captive bolt pistol are not recommended although in some abattoirs they do use it and the pigs are stunned using 80 volts.

Then, the pig's intestines are removed. The evisceration process is when the sexual, digestive and excretory organs are removed. These days, the pig can also be obtained as a half (Croatian: polovica or polutka), without intestines or blood.

In modern times, because of the danger of Trichinosis, people in some countries are required to have critical parts of the fresh meat tested by a veterinarian before any further contact with potentially infected meat.

Very sharp knives and a cleaver are required for butchering. The carcass is cut into hams, shoulders, bacon sides, pork bellies, ham hocks, loins, pork chops, and other cuts of lesser importance.

=== Processing of animal parts ===
After it is cut into pieces, the meat from the animal is then processed further into edible products.

The buttocks are salted and pressed in order to eventually produce ham. The ribcage meat is salted and smoked in order to get bacon. Salt is rubbed thoroughly into each piece of meat and all surfaces are covered. Some formulas also include much black pepper. The bulk of the meat is cut and ground to produce various sausages, which are traditionally wrapped into the intestines of various sizes.

Schematic representation of the main pork cuts.

The bulk of the fat is cut into small pieces. Some of it is fried to produce cracklings. Lard is made by rendering – heating fragments of fat in a large iron pot over a fire until it is reduced to simmering grease which congeals when cooled. Lard is then stored in lard tins with tin covers. The typical tins in the US are five US gallons (19 L). In some areas (mainly Eastern and Central Europe, but also Italy and United Kingdom), the fat is salted as is to produce salo, lardo or salt pork.

The intestines are stripped by drawing them through a clenched fist. They are then washed, cut into short pieces, and fried to make chitlins.

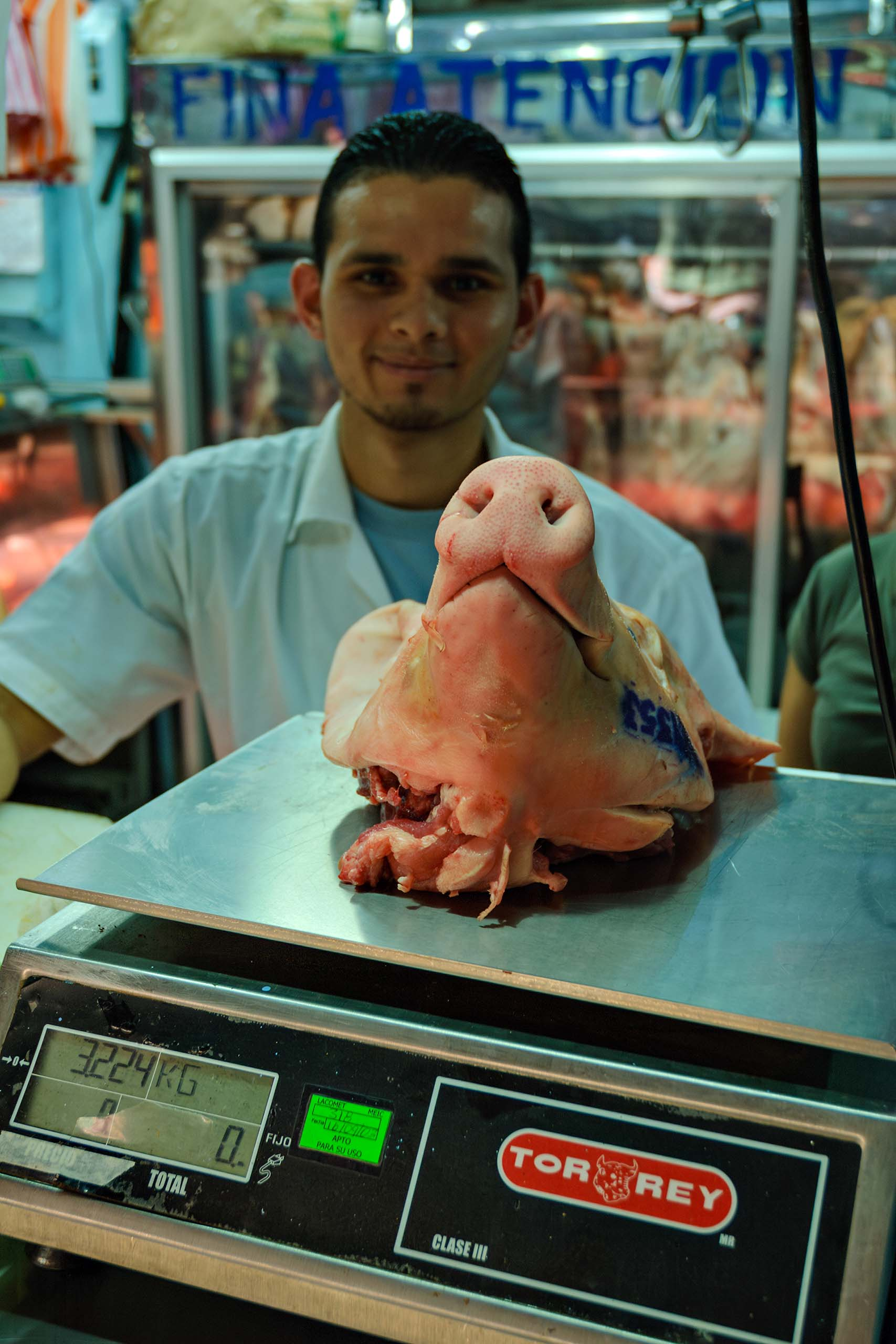
Pig's head on a scale at a butcher's at the covered market, Alajuela, Costa Rica

The various "leftovers" are put into various forms of headcheese jelly, etc. Most parts of the pig are used in this traditional process, even parts of the skin that would normally be thrown away are preserved to be cooked with beans.

The smoke house is essential for the preservation and long-term storage of hams, shoulders, bacon sides, and pork bellies. The meat is hung on racks and hooks in the smokehouse; and later smoked. Fragrant hardwood, such as hickory, beech, or cherry is allowed to smolder slowly in a pit below the hanging meat. This gives added flavor and color to the meat as well as serving to dry cure the pork.

== Country-specific statistics and customs ==
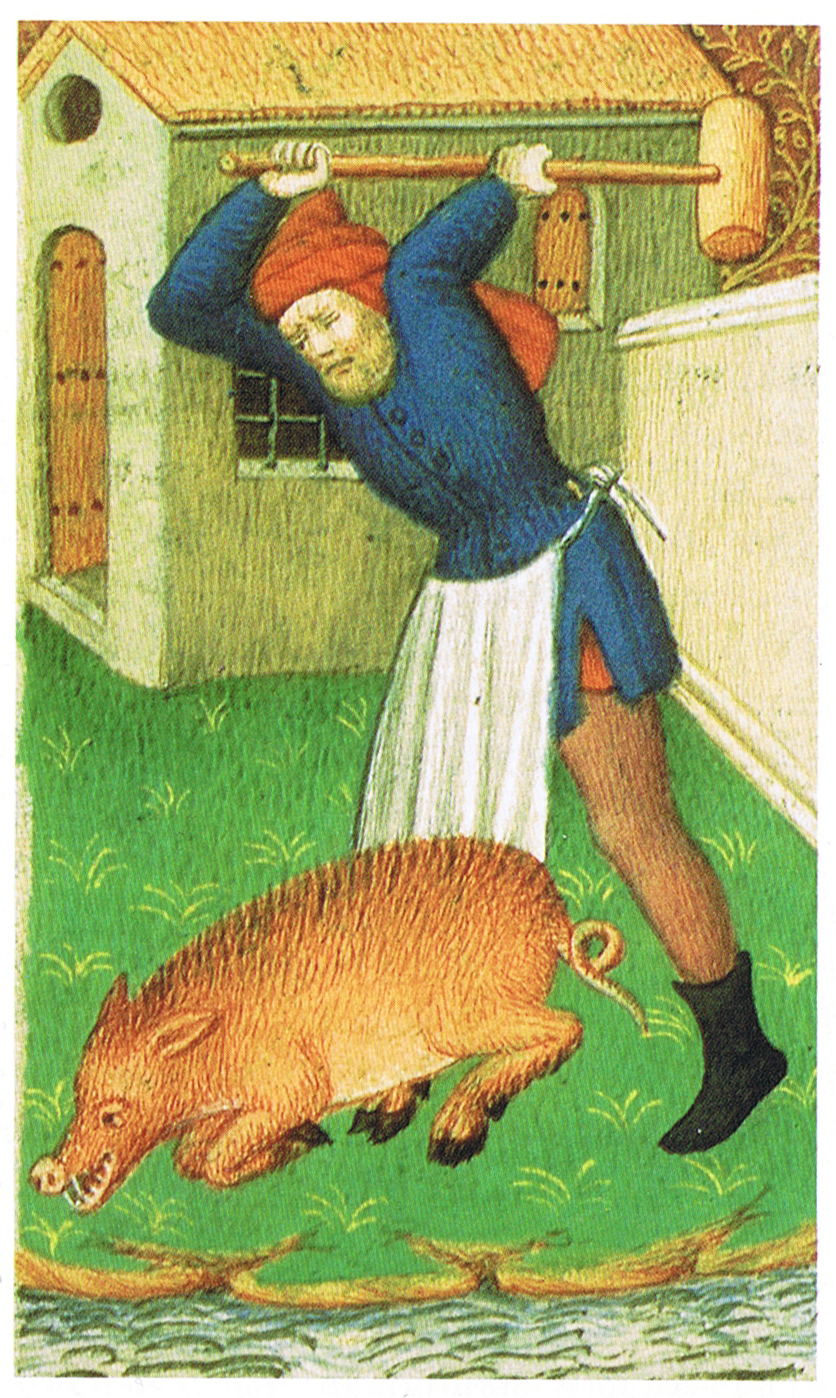
Illustration of medieval pig stunning, from The Medieval Cookbook

=== Former Yugoslavia ===
The traditional pig slaughter in Croatia as well as the neighboring Bosnia and Herzegovina, Slovenia and Serbia is a widespread practice that involves pig slaughtering, processing, and butchery of pig meat, and is observed by rural families, usually in late autumn. The tradition is variously called koline, kolinje, prašćina, svinjokolj, svinjokolja or svinjokolje or posjek. The names literally mean "pig-slaughtering" (svinja=pig, n., klanje=slaughter, n.). It is a custom specific to the parts of the countries in the Pannonian plain.

After WWII, in Yugoslavia, a state holiday fell on 29 November, with that and next day being non-working, so most slaughters were held on that occasion. In Croatian region Dalmatia, the pig-slaughter are traditionally done in period between Christmas and New Year's Eve.

The entire duration of the slaughter can be as long as three days. Because people were traditionally stocking up on supplies before winter, it became customary to slaughter more than one pig, which increased the amount of time necessary for the meat to be processed. Some families visit their relatives (often grandparents) and friends at that time of the year, in order to help. Also, little mechanization is used, with meat being cut manually. Any grinding is done with relatively small manually operated, mechanical grinding machines.

The traditionally produced ham (šunka), bacon (slanina), the sausages (kobasica, klobasa) such as blood sausage (krvavica) and kulen are well known as delicacies. Some of them, notably kulen, are classified under the laws of protected designation of origin. The byproducts such as cracklings (čvarci, ocvirki) or švargl and hladetina are parts of traditional cuisine.

To complement the activities, rakija or wine is drunk by participants during the butchering.

The pig liver is customarily roasted the same day of the slaughter.

Men and women were traditionally assigned different jobs during the slaughter. It was commonly the men who were doing the actual slaughter, the larger part of butchering, and the grinding of meat. Because the society is traditionally patriarchal, the women were in charge of a relatively menial tasks, such as waiting and cooking for the whole crew throughout the event, keeping the environment clean (washing and scrubbing), as well as the emptying the pigs' bowels in order to make them suitable for holding sausage meat.

The standard of hygiene long recommended by veterinarians has included various requirements for the people, tools and space used in the process. All people involved in the slaughter and butchering must be healthy, dressed with a hat, apron and boots, and clean hands. The tools (knives, axes, saws etc.) are sharpened, cleaned and disinfected before use, and they should be kept in a clean place throughout the process, preferably in a clean toolbox around the butcher's belt. The location of the killing needs to be a clean concrete surface with a sewer canal, meaning that the space can be easily cleaned. The trough used should have a zinced surface which is easy to clean and disinfect; the wooden troughs absorb water and microorganisms which makes them unsuitable.

The Croatian Ministry of Agriculture has published rules on sanitation requirements for animal slaughter since 1992, animal waste disposal rules since 2003, while regulations from 2005 also cover animal welfare in relation to slaughter. These rules track the relevant European Union regulation.

Croatian animal rights activists regard the traditional slaughtering process as cruel and outdated. They also question if European animal welfare and sanitary standards are really met, as there is not sufficient supervision available during the country-wide slaughter. Farmers are barely educated about the new standards they have to apply to, as this information is solely available through a website from the Ministry of Agriculture.

The most vocal Croatian animal rights organization "Animal Friends Croatia" advocates banning the entire practice.

In the process of Croatia's entry into the EU, there were widespread fears that new legislation would make svinjokolja as such illegal, forcing all pig slaughter to be conducted in controlled, inspected facilities. The fears were unwarranted because new regulation focused on stopping distribution of unhealthy meat products on the open market, rather than the traditional process where meat is consumed within household. Families check the meat for microbiological health and Trichinella

=== Czech Republic ===
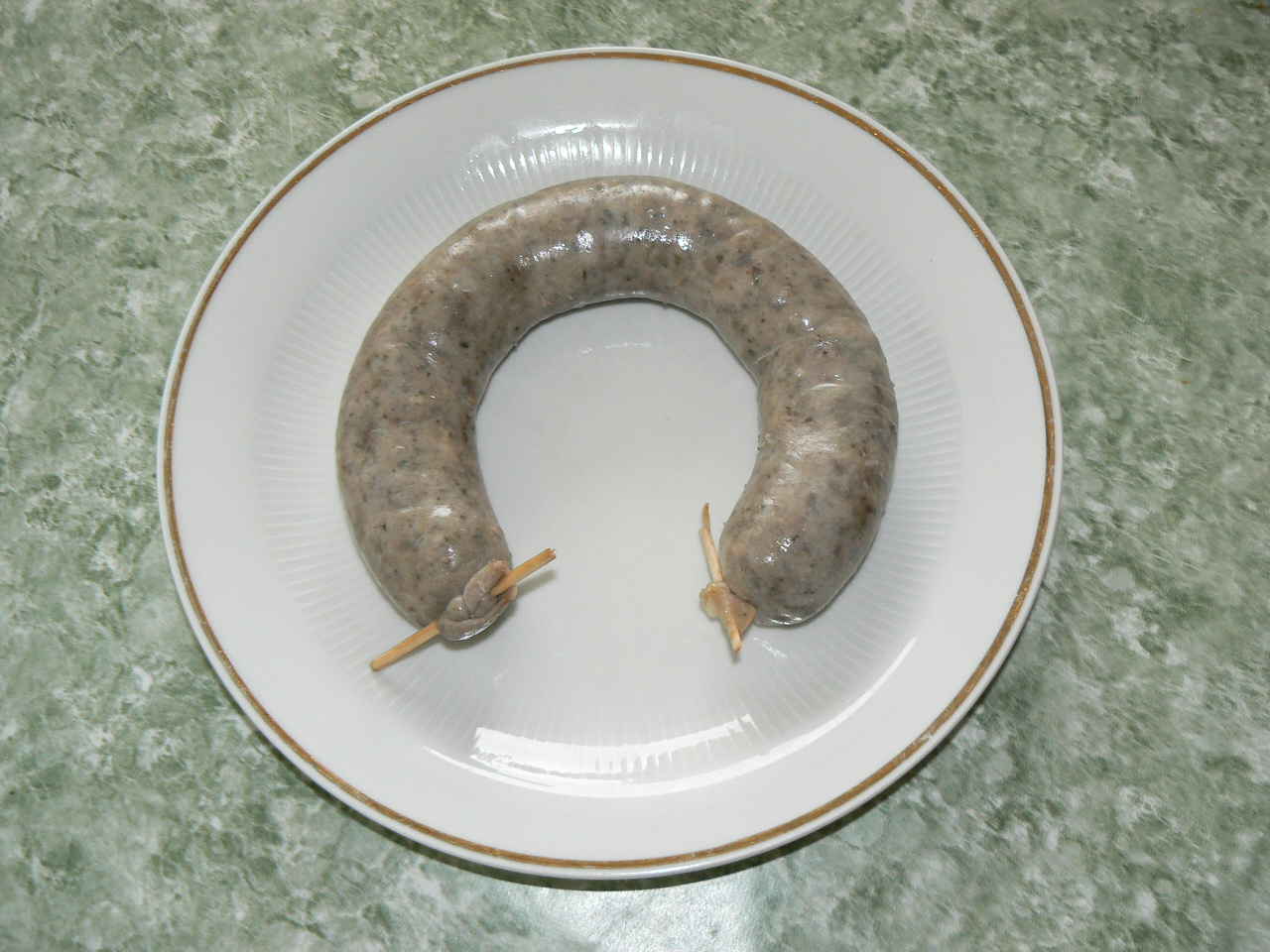
Jitrnice, traditional part of the Czech national cuisine

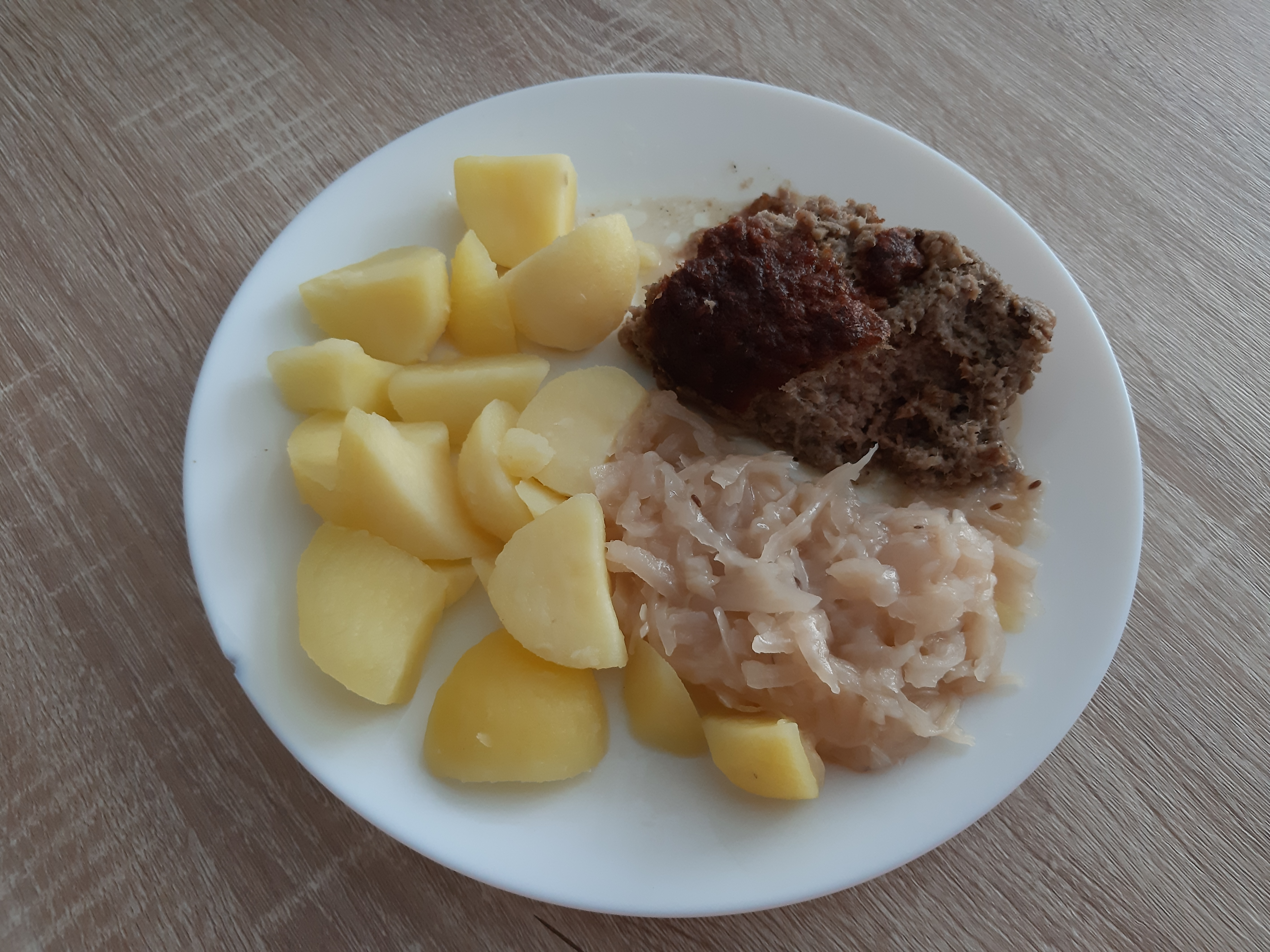
Prejt - boiled, ground and baked meat trimmings

In some countries traditional pig slaughter is a special event. Pig slaughter in the Czech Republic has usually taken place during the winter months, when low temperatures make it easier to store fresh meat and meat products. Preparations for the event extended over a number of days and involved a variety of ceremonies. The event itself was accompanied by the making of traditional dishes such as jitrnice, tlačenka, prdelačka and škvarky. After the slaughter, the young men of the village would visit neighbours and relatives bringing gifts of meat and fresh soup. The pig slaughter ended with what was called a karmina, a special celebration held in the household where the slaughter had taken place. Invited guests, sometimes dressed in masks, would join in the feasting and drinking. In the past, the traditional pig slaughters usually ended on Ash Wednesday.

Traditional pig slaughters (zabijačka) still (as of 2011) take place in public at Masopust (Mardi Gras) celebrations in many Czech towns and villages. However the domestic pig slaughter is a disappearing tradition. During the communist era it was cheaper and people preferred to raise and slaughter pigs at home. Many Bohemian and Moravian villagers worked in the JZD (collective farms) and it was easier for them to obtain the foodstuffs needed to fatten a pig. Since then pig raising and slaughtering has become less common in Czech villages and towns. It is also subject to regulation by the European Union. In 2009 Jan Březina, Czech politician and MEP, commented that: "The discovery that in Romania the animals are not paralyzed before slaughter provoked a hysterical reaction on the part of the European institutions. The older member states have begun calling for more stringent European regulation."

The traditional domestic pig slaughter was a favourite theme of the renowned Czech painter Josef Lada. In the play Prase (The Pig, 1987), Václav Havel tries to buy a pig for a zabijačka by local villagers, with difficulty because as a dissident he is considered politically suspect. In 1968, Jiří Šebánek, a founder of the Jára Cimrman Theatre, wrote the play The Pig Slaughter at Home. Toilet Horror.

=== Slovakia ===
In Slovakia, the pig slaughter (zabíjačka, zakáľačka, bravčovina, svinský kar, karmina) was an essential part of the winter traditions from early medieval times. The pig slaughter was considered an important event in village society and an opportunity for families to get together. According to Katarína Nádaská of the Department of Ethnology and Cultural Anthropology at Comenius University in Bratislava, the traditional period for pig slaughters usually started on 21 December, the feast day of St. Thomas. There was a special magical importance attached to the date and farmers believed that the meat of a pig slaughtered on St. Thomas Day would last longer. A second traditional pig slaughtering period began around Mardi Gras.

In the past there were a number of traditional customs associated with the pig slaughter. After the slaughter, the girls of the household would collect the bones and scatter them around the yard for love magic purposes. They believed that when a dog snatched the first bone, the girl who had thrown the bone would be the first one to marry.

=== Romania ===
In Romania pigs are traditional slaughtered around Christmas.

== See also ==
- Humane Slaughter Act
- Traditional diet
