= Van Leeuwen (surname) =

Van Leeuwen is a Dutch toponymic surname meaning "from Leeuwen". In 2007, nearly 28,000 people in the Netherlands carried the name, making it the 18th most common name there. There are two places named Leeuwen in Gelderland (Leeuwen and a hamlet absorbed in Wageningen) and two in Limburg (near Roermond and near Reuver). Considering the high frequency of the name and the small size of these two places, it has been speculated that people from many other places, such as the relatively larger Belgian cities of Leuven and Denderleeuw may have also ended up being called "van Leeuwen" as well. Although translated as "lions" in modern Dutch, the place name may be explained originating from Germanic hlaiw, meaning (burial) mound. The name appeared in records since the 13th-century in Holland. People with this surname include:

- Adrianus Cornelis van Leeuwen (1887–1991), Dutch composer and conductor
- Aletta van Leeuwen (1933–2001), Dutch poet and psychologist from the Netherlands Antilles
- Arie van Leeuwen (1910–2000), Dutch hurdler
- Ary van Leeuwen (1875–1953), Dutch-American flutist
- Bart van Leeuwen (1950–2017), Dutch photographer and author
- Boeli van Leeuwen (1922–2007), Dutch-Antillian author and poet
- Bram van Leeuwen (1918–2001), Dutch businessman
- Carol Van Leeuwen Grudowski (born 1977), American Artist
- Denys van Leeuwen (1402–1471), Limburgian Roman Catholic theologian and mystic
- Dirk van Leeuwen (born 1945), Dutch Anglican clergyman
- Eugenie van Leeuwen (born 1970), Dutch cricketer
- Gerrit Johan van Leeuwen (1756–1825), Dutch fruit and flower painter
- Hannie van Leeuwen (1926–2018), Dutch CDA politician
- Hans van Leeuwen (born 1946), Dutch-American engineering professor
- Hans van Leeuwen (physicist) (1932–2024), Dutch physicist
- Hendrika Johanna van Leeuwen (1887–1974), Dutch physicist, co-discoverer of the Bohr-van Leeuwen theorem
- Herman van Leeuwen (1884–1926), Dutch gymnast and high jumper
- Jan van Leeuwen (born 1946), Dutch computer scientist
- Jean Van Leeuwen (1937–2025), American author of children's books
- Joke van Leeuwen (born 1952), Dutch author of children's books
- Laura van Leeuwen (born 1986), Dutch gymnast
- Liz VanLeeuwen (1925–2022), American politician in the state of Oregon
- Marc van Leeuwen (born 1960), Dutch mathematician
- Martin van Leeuwen (born 1981), Dutch football defender
- Martine van Leeuwen (born 1968), Dutch competitive sailor
- Nans van Leeuwen (1900–1995), Dutch children's book illustrator and author
- Robbie van Leeuwen (born 1944), Dutch guitarist and founder of the band Shocking Blue
- Steven van Leeuwen, American (?) web publisher
- Theo van Leeuwen (born 1947), Dutch linguist and communication theorist
- Thomas van Leeuwen (born 1994), Dutch motorcycle racer.
- Troy Van Leeuwen (born 1970), American musician and producer
- Wietske van Leeuwen (born 1965), Dutch ceramist
- Wilfred van Leeuwen (born 1973), Dutch football manager
- Wilhelmus Frederik van Leeuwen (1860–1930), Dutch politician and Mayor of Amsterdam

Double-barreled surnames

- Arthur Docters van Leeuwen (1945–2020), Dutch politician and jurist
- Willem Marius Docters van Leeuwen (1880–1960), Dutch botanist and entomologist
- Jan Willem Storm van Leeuwen (born 1941), Dutch chemist
