= Blood tongue =

German head cheese with tongue

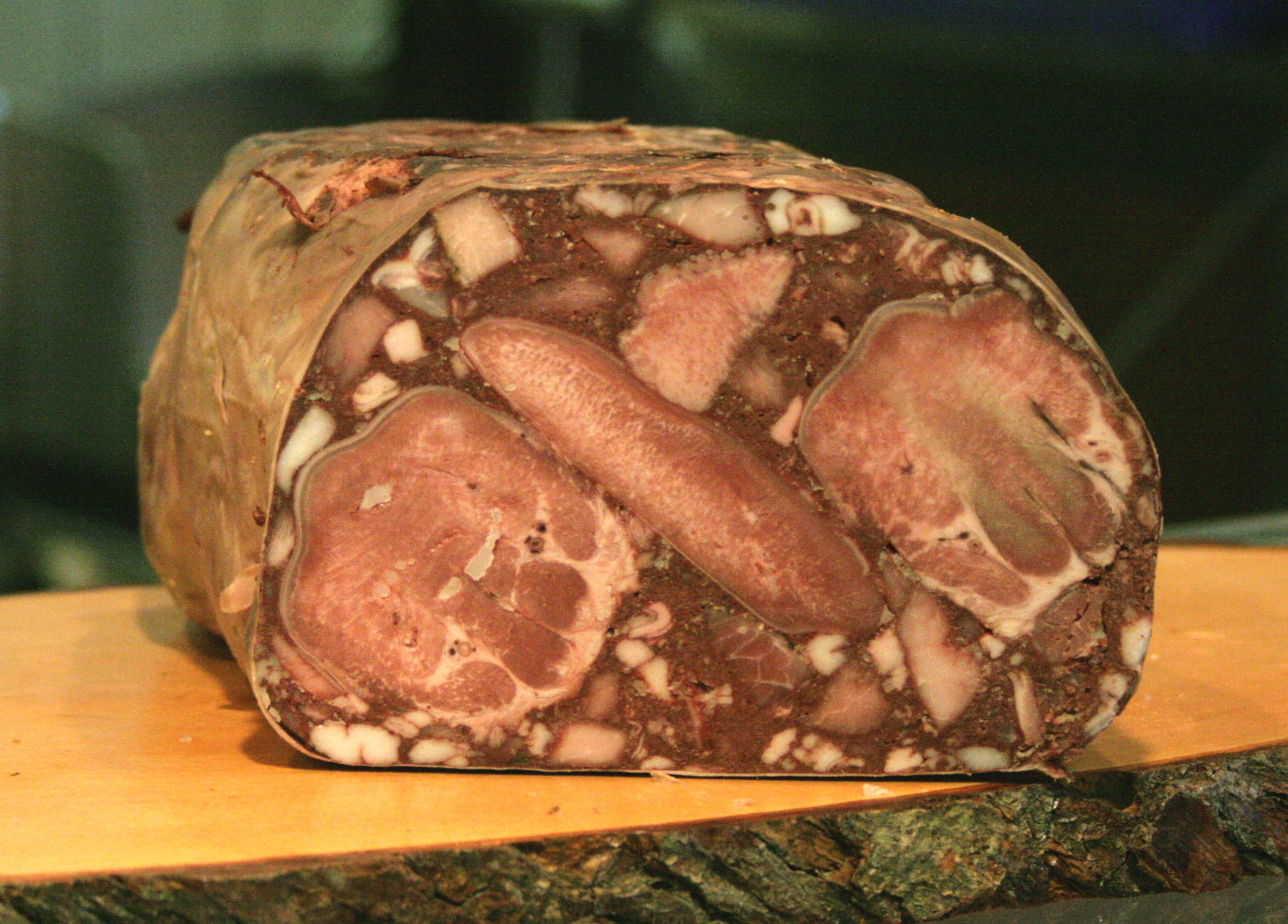
Cold cut of blood tongue

Blood tongue, or Zungenwurst (translation: tongue sausage), is a variety of German head cheese with blood. It is a large head cheese that is made with pig's blood, suet, bread crumbs and oatmeal with chunks of pickled beef tongue added. It has a slight resemblance to blood sausage. It is commonly sliced and browned in butter or bacon fat prior to consumption. It is sold in markets pre-cooked and its appearance is maroon to black in color.

It is also sold in some delis as a cold cut.
