= Head cheese =

Cold cut non-dairy meat jelly or terrine

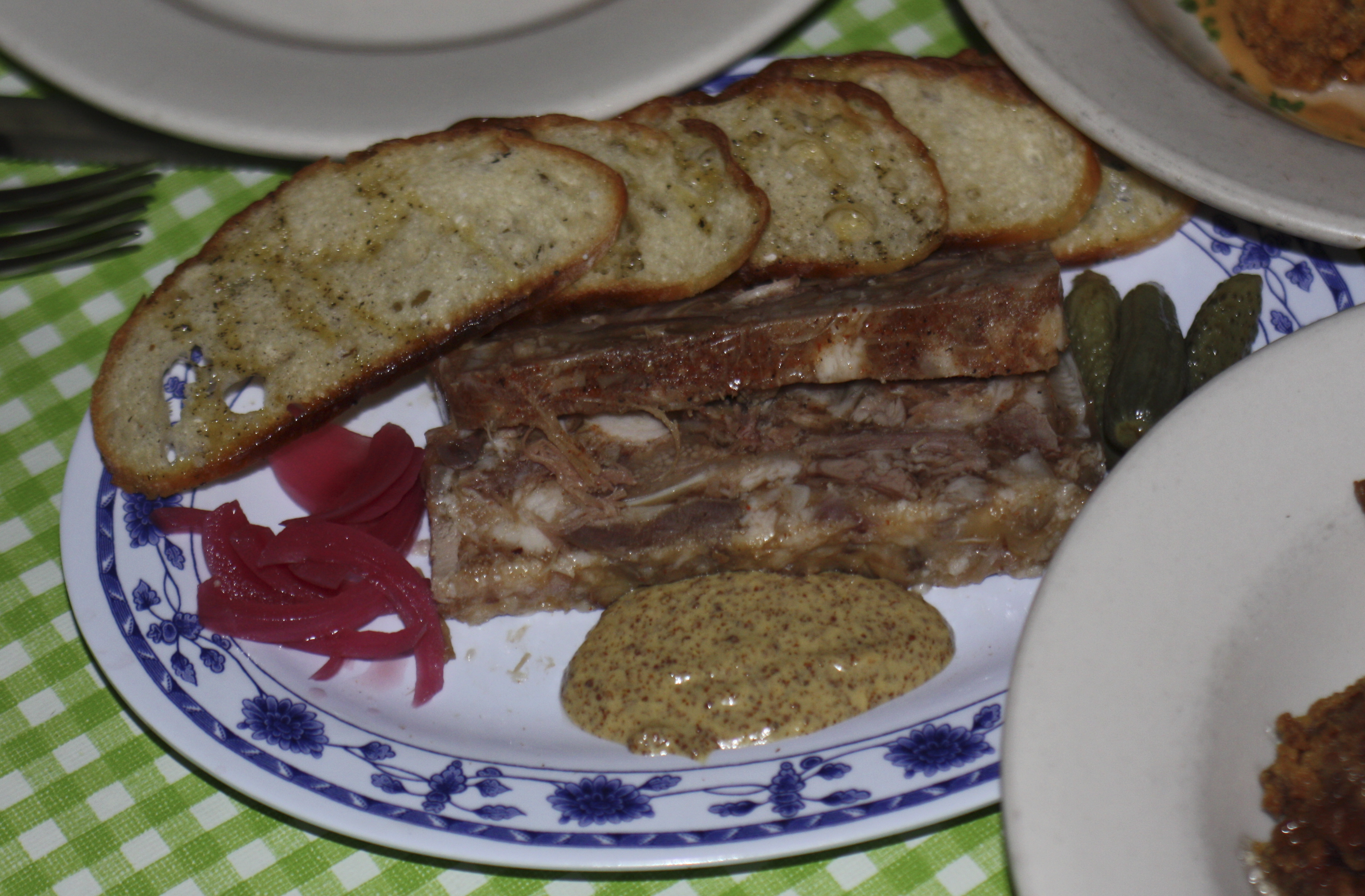
Head cheese, Elizabeth's restaurant, New Orleans

Head cheese (Dutch: hoofdkaas) or souse or brawn is a meat jelly or terrine made of meat. Somewhat similar to a jellied meatloaf, it is made with flesh from the head of a calf or pig (less commonly a sheep or cow), typically set in aspic. It is usually eaten cold, at room temperature, or in a sandwich. Despite its name, the dish is not a cheese and contains no dairy products. The parts of the head used vary, and may include the tongue but do not commonly include the brain, eyes or ears. Trimmings from more commonly eaten cuts of pork and veal are often used, while the feet and heart are used less often.

Variations of head cheese exist throughout Europe and elsewhere, with differences in preparation and ingredients. A version pickled with vinegar is known as souse. Historically, meat jellies were made of the head of an animal, less its organs, which would be simmered to produce a naturally gelatinous stock that would congeal as the dish cooled. Meat jellies made this way were commonly a peasant food and have been made since the Middle Ages. Earlier brawns heavily featured spices and herbs, but beginning in the eighteenth century, the amount of seasoning was reduced. Contemporary brawn now features minimal spicing, usually sage, and perhaps a little lemon juice. Head cheese recipes may also require additional gelatin, or more often need to be reduced to set properly.

== Etymology ==
The English term head cheese is a calque derived from the Dutch word hoofdkaas, which literally translates to 'head cheese'. The term hoofdkaas can be divided into hoofd ('head') originating from the animal heads commonly used to prepare the dish, and kaas ('cheese') describing the texture, which resembles that of cheese.

== Terminology ==
The term head cheese is used in North America, potted heid in Scotland, and brawn elsewhere in Britain and Australia. The name brawn, coming from German and Old French, has had a variety of meanings, from roasted meat to specific types of food. At one point, in English, it referred to the meat of the wild boar, then abundant in Great Britain, from which this jellied dish was made. The term souse, a corruption of the German Sülze, is used for the pickled variety in North America and the West Indies.

== By country ==
=== Europe ===
- Austria: Head cheese is known as Presswurst, Sulz or Schwartamaga in the most western regions. Depending on the region, it is often served with a light dressing (vinegar, sunflower seed oil or pumpkin seed oil, sliced onions).
- Bulgaria: The meal пача (pacha) is prepared from pig's heads (primarily the ears), legs, and often tongue. The broth is heavily seasoned with garlic before cooling.
- Croatia: This cut is generally known as hladetina, and is commonly produced after the traditional slaughter of pigs. A strongly seasoned version of this cut is called tlačenica. The name švargl is used for a variant where the chopped parts are stuffed inside the pig's stomach, similar to a Scottish haggis.
- Cyprus: made with pork and known as zalatina, a word possibly derived from the English word gelatin. It is often seasoned with lemon juice.
- Czech Republic: The huspenina or sulc (from German Sülze) is made from pig's heads or legs boiled together, chopped, mixed in their broth, poured into a pan, and left in the cold to solidify. Other ingredients may include onion, pepper, allspice, bayleaf, vinegar, salt, carrot, parsley, root celery, and sometimes eggs. A similar product, tlačenka, is basically huspenina with some more meat, chopped liver, and various offal, poured into a prepared pig stomach and left to solidify under the weight. Tlačenka is generally thicker than huspenina, and commonly is eaten with chopped onions and sprinkled with vinegar.
- Denmark, Norway and Sweden: Sylte, sylta or aladåb, was originally made from the head of pig, but now commonly is made from the forequarters or shanks of pork or veal and seasoned with allspice, bay leaves, and thyme; this forms part of the traditional Christmas smörgåsbord, served on rugbrød or lefse with strong mustard and pickled beetroots. A rolled version (Danish/Norwegian: rullepølse, Swedish: rullsylta) made in an otherwise similar way also exists; however, this contains very little aspic.
- Estonia: Sült is similar to the German or Croatian dish (the name is a loan, as well), but usually is less seasoned and is made from higher quality meat. Sült tends to be a rather loose form of head cheese with higher aspic to meat ratio and the aspic soft enough that the dish would usually start to slightly fall apart/melt if left at room temperature (harder variants do exist). Sometimes carrots or greens are added. It is a traditional Christmas dish, but is sold in stores year round. The traditional sült is made from pork using its gelatinous parts. Beef, poultry, and fish variants are also available. Sült might be served with diluted vinegar to be poured over. Horseradish or strong mustard are also common accompaniments.
- Finland: Head cheese is known as syltty, tytinä or aladobi.
- France and Belgium: In French, it is referred to as fromage de tête, tête pressée, tête fromagée (which translates as 'cheesed head') or pâté de tête.

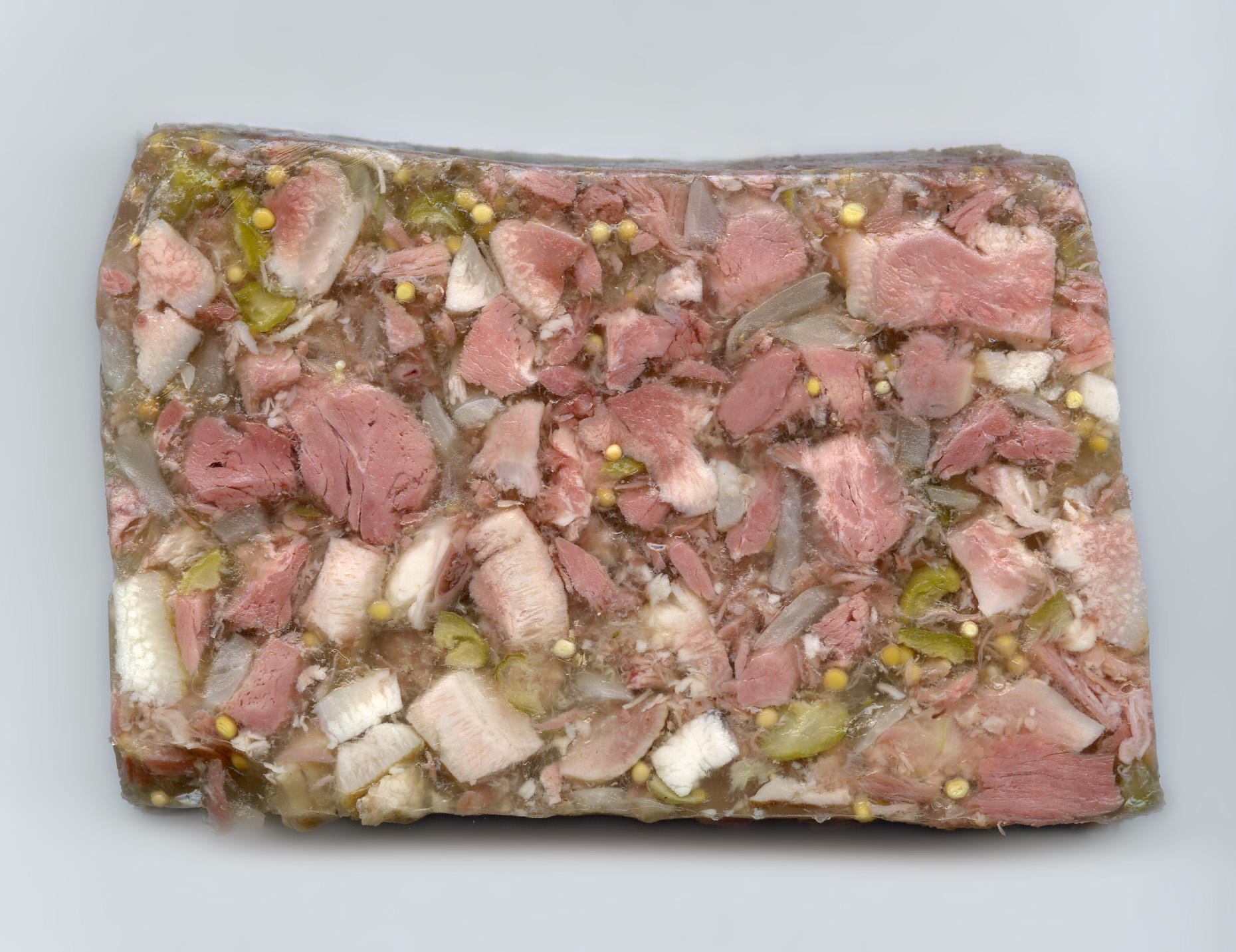
German Sülze

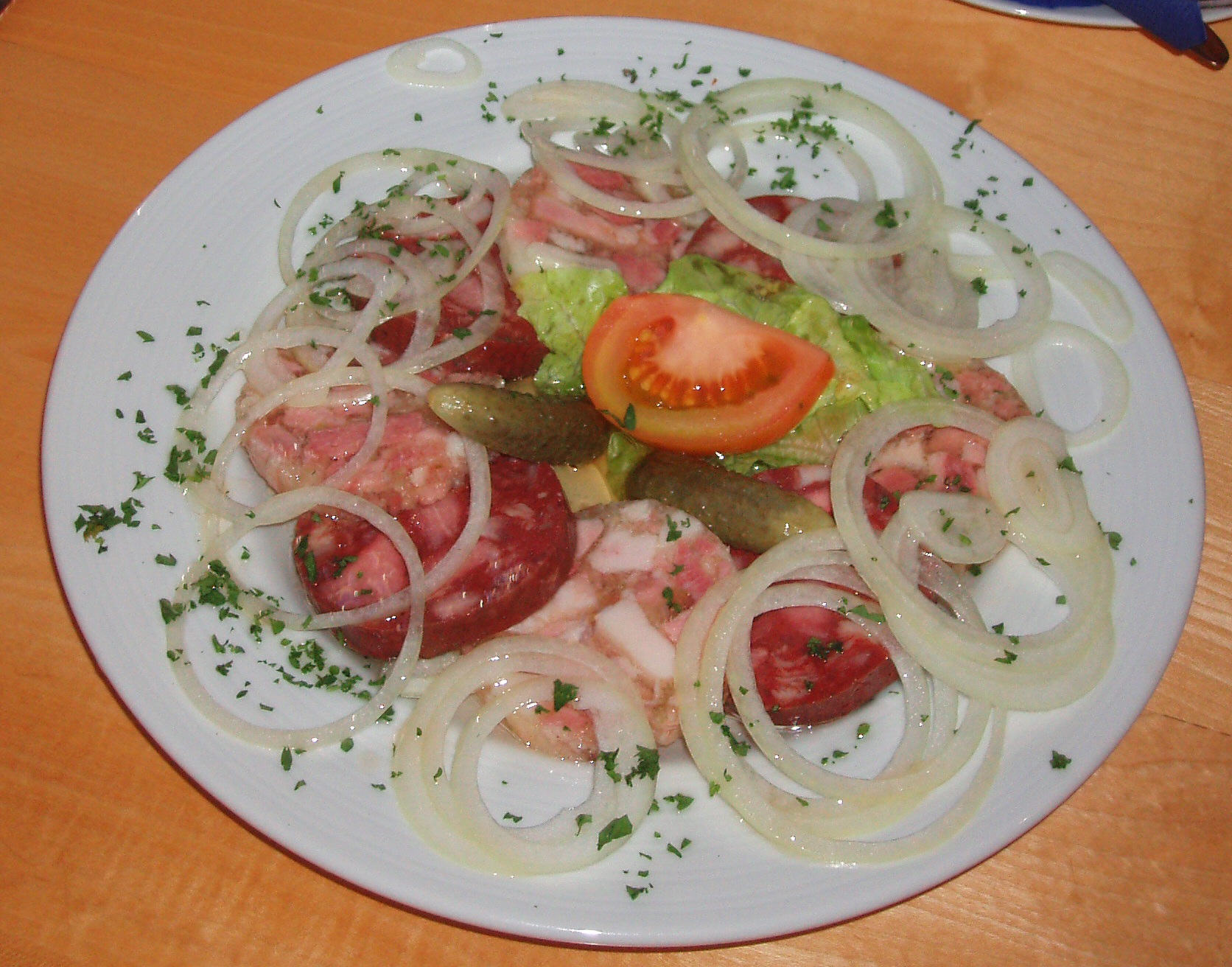
Saurer Presssack

- Germany: Head cheese is known as Sülze, Schwartenmagen, or Presskopf. In Bavaria, Presssack comes in three varieties (deep red, pinkish, and grey) in the form of a large (15 cm (5.9 in) diameter) sausage. Sülze can have a tangy flavour by adding pickles or vinegar. It usually takes the form of a rectangular loaf, which is then sliced into portions. There is a white coloured variety and two different red ones, using blood, one made with beef tongue (as in Zungenwurst) and aspic, the other without. In Franconia, Saurer Presssack is served in a salad with a vinaigrette and vegetables. Early references to Sulcze in documents of the Counts of Katzenelnbogen date from 1410 and 1430.

When using only pure meat of highest quality (i.e., without fat, gristle or meat of lower quality) it is called Kaisersülze ('Emperor's Aspic').

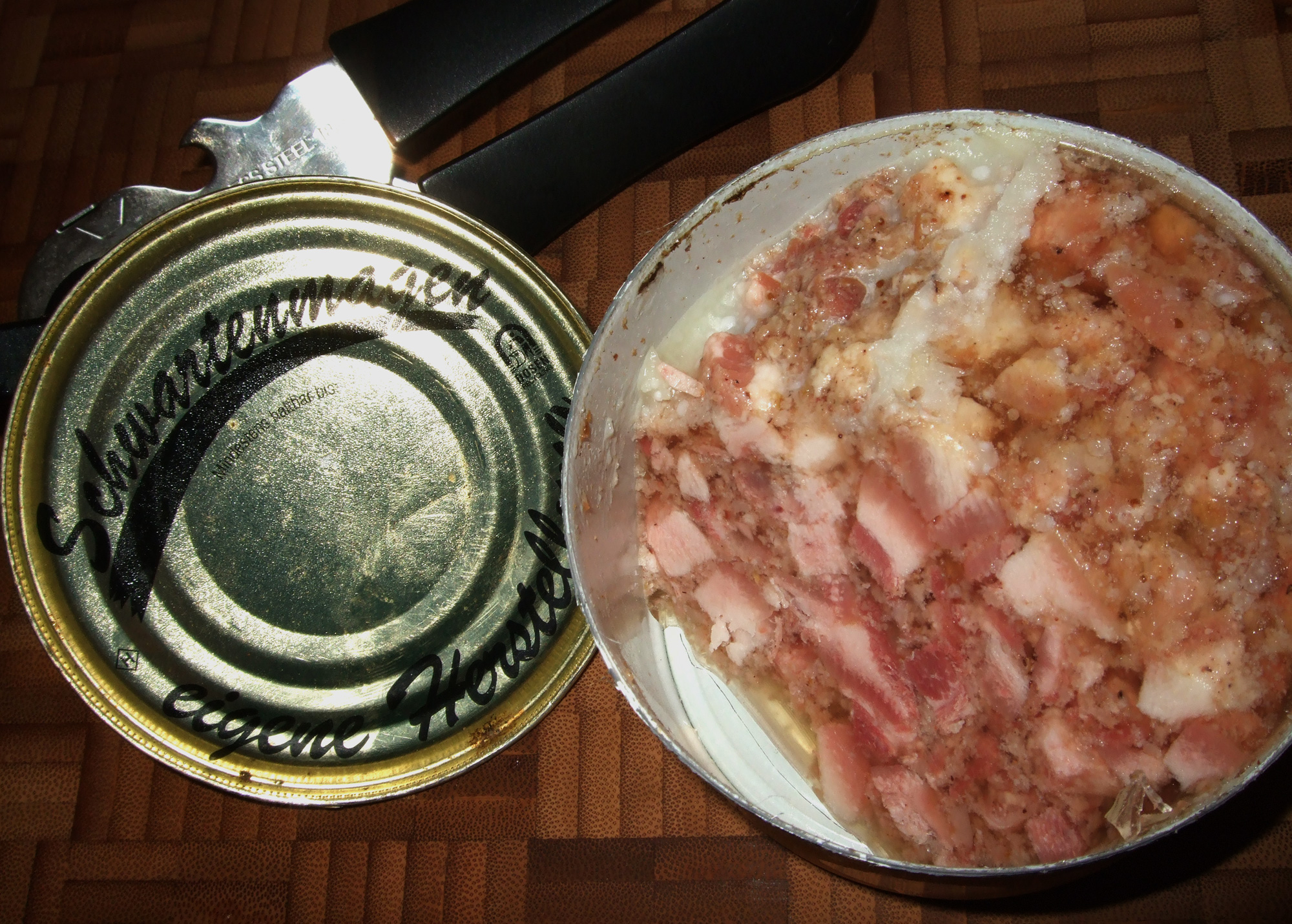
German Schwartenmagen in a tin as it is sold as a type of Hausmacher-Wurst, i.e. homemade sausage

- Greece: In Greece and among Greeks of the diaspora, it is known as pichti (πηχτή) and usually incorporates vinegar.
- Hungary: A variant of head cheese, disznósajt, or disznófősajt (pork cheese or pork head cheese), is made of mixed meat slices (especially from the head of the pig,) spices, paprika, and pieces of bacon cooked in spicy stock. The chopped meat is stuffed into the pig's stomach, similar to Scottish haggis, pricked with needles, then pressed down with weights to remove excess fat and make it tight and compact. Often it is smoked like sausages or ham.
- Iceland: Sviðasulta, a form of head cheese, is made from svið, singed sheep's head, sometimes cured in lactic acid.
- Ireland: brawn is considered a rare delicacy and is made from pig's head. It dates from at least the early 19th century CE.
- Italy: In Genoa, a similar cold cut goes by the name of testa in cassetta, literally 'head in a box', but it is possible to find it throughout all of central and northern Italy, where it is called coppa di testa, or simply coppa, soppressata in Tuscany, or – in some northern regions – formaggio di testa ('head cheese'). In central Italy (Lazio, Umbria), it is common to put orange peel pieces in it, or to serve it in a salad together with oranges and black olives. In the Campania region, the head and foot, called 'o pere e 'o musso, is boiled, left whole and sliced, served with lupini beans and fresh lemon. A version in aspic from Sicily known as liatina includes the head, feet, skin and ears, flavored with bay leaf, pepper, vinegar and lemon.

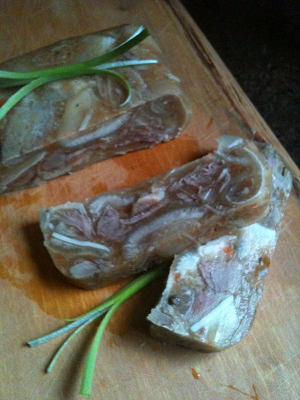
Sliced Latvian head cheese

- Latvia: Galerts is a similar Latvian food consisting of meat in gelatin, often with vegetables, such as carrots, and celery added to the resulting colloidal suspension. Horseradish or vinegar can be poured over the galerts when serving it.
- Lithuania: Košeliena (derived from košė 'pulp, squash') or šaltiena (derived from šalta, 'cold', referring to how the dish is served), is usually made from pig's feet; sometimes part of head is added.

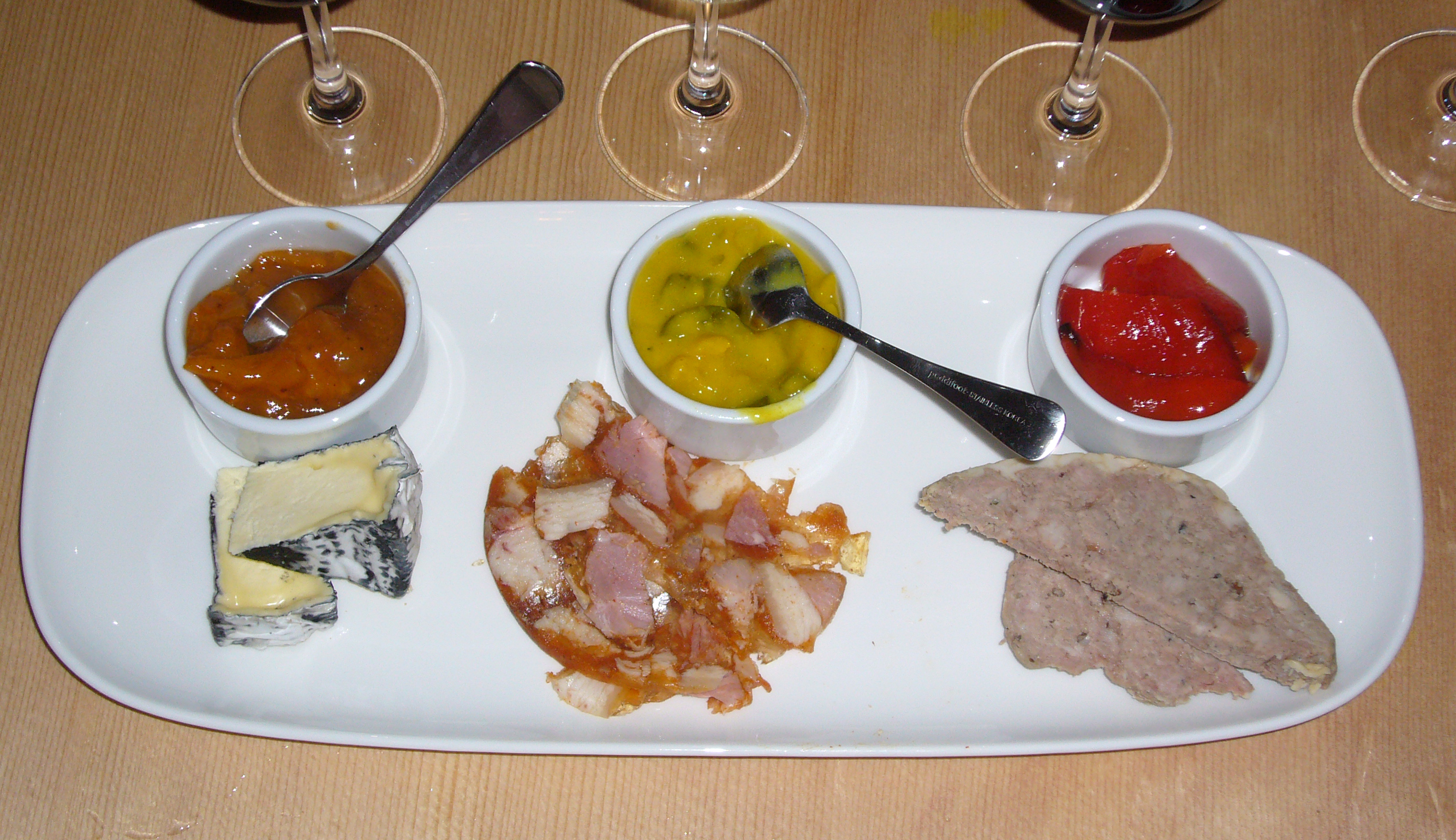
Camembert, head cheese, and terrine de campagne

- Luxembourg: Jelli is essentially the same as in the neighbouring Germany and France, made from pork, and commonly eaten on buttered bread (optionally with mustard). A specialty are varying kinds of pastries filled with jelli that are made with aspic containing Riesling wine, most famously Rieslingspaschtéit.
- Netherlands and Belgium: Head cheese is known under several regional names and variations. In Brabant, it is called zult and is made with blood. Pig's foot provides the gelatin and a little vinegar is added to it. In Limburg, it is called hoofdkaas, meaning 'head cheese', and is eaten on bread or with Limburgisch sausage as a starter. A red, sweet variety and a slightly sour, grey variety are available. The red one can be compared to Brabantine zult. Both zult and preskop are also found in Limburg, though zult is less sour, whereas preskop often contains black pepper and is eaten on wholewheat bread. In Belgium, head cheese is also called kop or kopvlees, which translates as 'meat from the head'.
- Poland: The nearest Polish equivalent of head cheese is salceson. According to Słownik Wyrazów Obcych PWN, the word comes from the Italian salsiccione meaning salsiccia di grosse dimensioni. According to Wielka Encyklopedia Powszechna PWN, salceson traditionally is encased in either a pig's stomach or a cow's bladder. Specific varieties include: s. ozorkowy 'tongue' which uses beef tongue; s. brunszwicki 'Brunswick' which uses liver and is spiced with marjoram; s. włoski 'Italian' which is spiced with garlic, black pepper, fennel and cumin seeds; s. czarny 'black' which contains blood, semolina and bread crumbs, and can be regarded as a variant of kaszanka.
- Portugal: Known as cabeça de xara, it is mainly prepared in the Alentejo region.
- Romania: Two versions include tobă 'drum' or, especially in Transylvania, caş de cap de porc ('pig head cheese', akin to the Hungarian disznófősajt), which looks like a wide, 4 in (10 cm) sausage and the marginally similar piftie. It is the same dish as Serbian and Macedonian pihtije, in which the ingredients are poured into a bowl and refrigerated. Piftie is not necessarily head meat, but can be different kinds of meat, boiled with garlic and bay leaves. It is prepared by boiling pig's feet to make a soup, as feet contain more gelatin than any other part of the pig. The mixture is then cooled to make a jelly. Usually, garlic is added.
- Russia: Head cheese is a popular food for festive occasions. Beef or lamb head cheese is also popular in the Jewish community. It is more popularly called saltisón (сальтисон), zelts (зельц), or kholodets (холодец).
- Serbia: Head cheese in Serbia is called švargla, and it is particularly popular in northern Serbia, Vojvodina. While each village has its special recipe, with particular seasoning or special cuts of meat added, the basic švargla is made with pig's tongue, heart, kidneys, skin and meat from the head. The meat is seasoned with paprika, salt, black pepper and garlic. Preparation consists of boiling the ingredients, filling the pig's stomach with them, and boiling the whole filled stomach again. Once the boiling is done, švargla is then pressed under weight, and smoked for several days.
- Slovakia: A special variety of head cheese, called tlačenka (pressed one), is popular in Slovakia. It is made of pork stomach stuffed with offal and leftover parts of pig's heads and legs. It is seasoned with garlic, paprika, black pepper, and other ingredients and usually smoked. It is traditionally served with sliced onion, vinegar, and bread.

Huspenina (also called studeno, meaning 'cold one') is similar to a certain extent, but made with less meat and more gelatine. It is more similar to aspic, pork jelly, or hladetina.

- Slovenia: it is known as tlačenka, 'pressed-one', or informally as žolca.

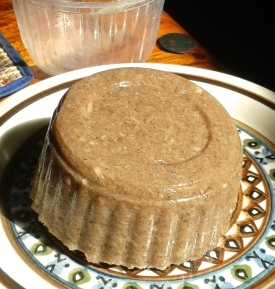
Potted heid, a Scottish version of head cheese

- Spain: This cold cut is known as cabeza de jabalí, 'boar's head'.
- Sweden: Known as sylta, a few variations are available with different meats, spices, and preparation methods, the most popular being kalvsylta (jellied veal), pressylta (pressed pork and veal brawn), and rullsylta (rolled and pressed side of pork). Common seasonings are onions, white pepper, allspice, cloves, salt and bay leaves, and occasionally carrots and herbs are added to the ingredients. Sylta is often regarded as a seasonal food eaten at the julbord at Christmas.
- Switzerland: The recipe is known as sülzli, and it is typically made with chopped ham or pork.
- Ukraine: known as kovbyk, kendiukh or saltseson, head cheese is usually a combination of a variety of pork meats made into a pressed loaf.
  - Volhynia and Polisia historical regions have a specific variant of the dish, called matsyk, which is made to be especially meaty, filled to the brim with cured pork.

- United Kingdom: In England and Wales, head cheese is referred to as brawn or (in Yorkshire and Norfolk) pork cheese. In Scotland, it is known as potted heid (potted head of beef, pork, or sheep); the similar potted haugh or hough is made from the shank of the animal.

=== Africa ===
South Africa: Known as sult in Afrikaans and brawn in South African English. It is often flavoured with curry.

=== Asia ===
Iran: A common breakfast dish is known as kallepache. Kallepache is served in special restaurants known as kallepazi. It consists of cooked sheep's head marinated in its oil and cinnamon. Iranians eat it as a heavy dish from about 5:00am. The original name in Turkish is Kelle Paça, where "Kelle" means head, and "paça" means trotters/sleeves. The dish has deep roots in Anatolian cuisine.

China: In certain parts of Northern China, such as Beijing, 'pig head meat' is cooked and thinly sliced and served at room temperature. In southern China, xiao rou (肴肉) is made by boning and pickling pig trotters with brine and alum. The meat is then rolled, pressed and eaten cold. In northeastern China, a jellied pork skin dish is often made and served with a spicy soy sauce and vinegar mixture with crushed garlic and red chili powder.

Korea: In Korean cuisine, a similar dish, pyeonyuk (편육), is made by pressing meat, usually from the head of the pig. It is eaten as anju (dishes associated with alcoholic beverages) and usually served to funeral visitors.

Vietnam: In Vietnam, giò thủ is a similar cold cut dish made around Tết for New Year celebrations. It is a dish popular in the North and made of pork belly, pig's ears, garlic, scallions, onions, wood ear mushrooms, fish sauce, and cracked black pepper. Traditionally, giò thủ is wrapped in banana leaves and compressed in a wooden mold until the gelatin in the pig's ears bind it together.

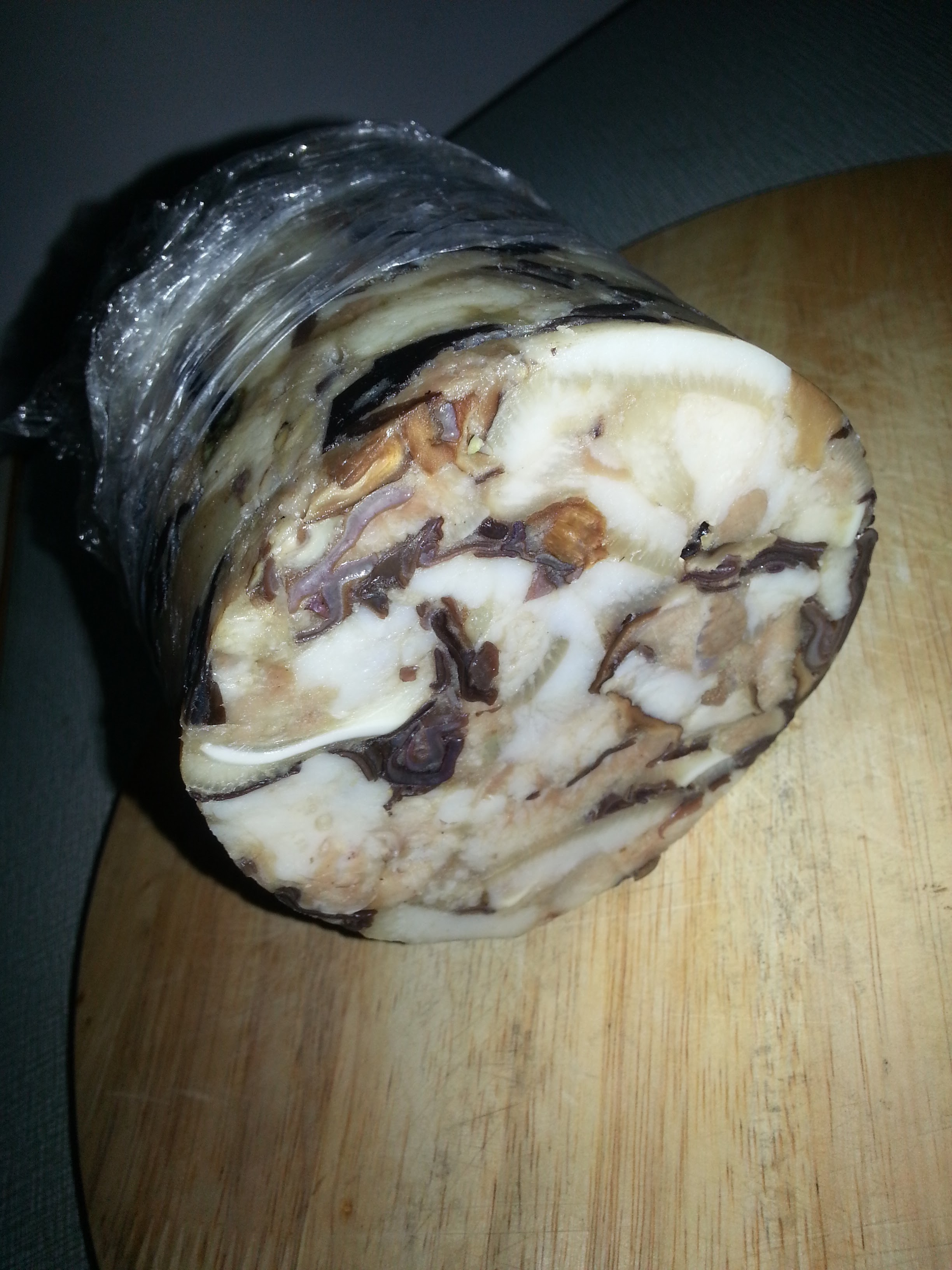
A piece of giò thủ

=== Australia ===
In Australia, it is known as brawn or Presswurst. It is usually seen as something of an old-fashioned dish, although various large firms, such as D'Orsogna, Don Smallgoods and KR Castlemaine produce it.

=== Caribbean ===
Souse is pickled meat and trimmings usually made from pig's feet, chicken feet or cow's tongue, to name a few parts. The cooked meat or trimmings are cut into bite-sized pieces and soaked in a brine made of water, lime juice, cucumbers, hot pepper, salt and specially prepared seasonings. Usually it is eaten on Saturday mornings, especially in St. Vincent and Barbados. In Trinidad and Tobago, it is served or sold at most social gatherings, such as parties, all-inclusive fetes and sporting competitions.

=== Latin America ===
Head cheese is popular and is usually referred to as queso de cabeza in Chile and Colombia. In Peru, Ecuador, Bolivia, and Costa Rica, it is also known as queso de chancho. It is known as queso de cerdo in Uruguay and Argentina. In Panama, it is known as sous (from Caribbean English souse), made with pig's feet and prepared the same way as in the Caribbean; it is a dish from the Caribbean coast, where most of Panama's West Indian community resides.

In Brazil, head cheese is popular among the gaucho population and is commonly known as queijo de porco 'pig cheese'. In the German-colonized cities, such as Pomerode and Blumenau, it follows the German recipe and is known as Sülze.

In Mexico, it is known as queso de puerco and is usually spiced with oregano, vinegar, garlic, and black pepper.

=== North America ===
Alberta, Canada: the typical jellied meat available in stores is labelled "head cheese", whether or not it is actually made from the head. The large Eastern European community in the province also has a (declining) tradition of making jellied meat at home, usually from pigs' feet, and this is called studenetz in the local dialect of the Ukrainian language.

Pennsylvania, United States: In the Pennsylvania Dutch language, head cheese is called souse. Pennsylvania Germans usually prepare it from the meat of pig's feet or tongue and it is pickled with sausage.

Wisconsin, Illinois, Michigan, and other portions of the Upper Midwest, United States: Head cheese and sulze are both made from pork snouts and tongues, but head cheese often uses larger chunks of smoked meat, while sulze generally uses unsmoked, chopped meat and has added vinegar and pickles.

Louisiana, Mississippi, Alabama, and other portions of the Deep South, United States: The highly seasoned hog's head cheese is very popular as a cold cut or appetizer. A pig's foot provides the gelatin that sets the cheese, and vinegar is typically added to give a sour taste. It is a popular Cajun food and is often encountered seasoned with green onions. It is called in Louisiana French fromage de cochon. In Mississippi, Alabama, and other Southern states, it is encountered in a spicy form known as souse or less spicy as hog's head cheese.

Newfoundland and Labrador, Canada: Throughout Newfoundland, brawn is typically made from wild game such as moose and caribou.

Ontario, Canada: Commercial, processed versions made with pork are sold in the deli section in some grocery stores in Ontario, such as in the German 'heimat' of Waterloo Region.

Quebec, Canada: Called tête fromagée, it is commonly available in grocery stores and butcher shops along with cretons and terrines.

Prince Edward Island, Canada: Now uncommon and seen as old fashioned. It was common before 1970 and often referred to as potted head or potted meat.

New Brunswick, Canada: A spread similar to cretons made from pork head and Boston butt and seasoned primarily with onion, salt, and summer savory, is often referred to as head cheese.

== See also ==
- Blood tongue
- Pork jelly
- P'tcha
- Aspic
