= Govert van der Leeuw =

Dutch Golden Age landscape painter

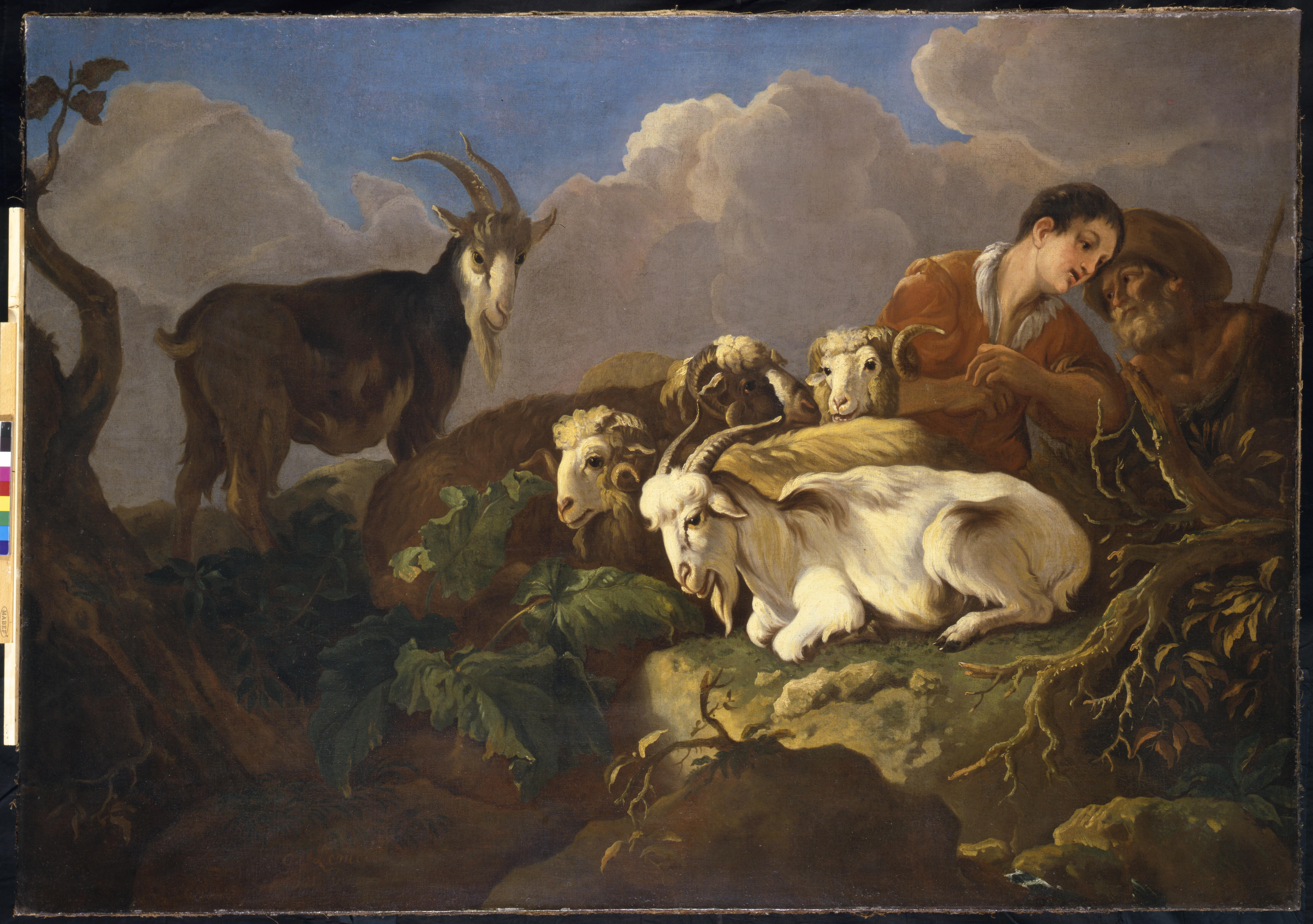
- Shepherds
- Born: 11 November 1645; Dordrecht
- Died: 3 July 1688 (aged 42); Dordrecht
- Known for: Painting
- Movement: Dutch Golden Age painting

Gabriel, or Govert van der Leeuw (1645–1688), was a Dutch Golden Age landscape painter.

== Biography ==
He was the brother of Pieter van der Leeuw, and they learned to paint from their father, the painter Bastiaan Govertsz van der Leeuw, who had been a pupil of Jacob Gerritsz Cuyp. As a young man he traveled to Amsterdam, where he married the sister of David van der Plas. He then set off on a 14-year journey, spending 4 years in Paris and Lyons, 2 years at the Court of Savoy in Turin, a year in Rome, and 7 years in Naples, before returning to Amsterdam. He painted landscapes in the manner of Johann Heinrich Roos and Giovanni Benedetto Castiglione. He was planning another journey south, and had stopped to see his mother in Dordrecht on the way, when he unexpectedly died.

According to the RKD, he was registered in the Amsterdam workshop of his cousin, the painter Nicolaes Pietersz. Berchem in 1651, and in 1672, he attended the funeral of his nephew, Nicolaes Berchem II, in Paris. He was influenced not only by Roos and Castiglione, but also by Pieter Mulier II and Luca Giordano. He signed his works 'gvd leeu' or in Italy, 'G De Leone'. The RKD claims he married in 1684, not before he started his journey, as Houbraken claimed.
