= Mena B. Lafkioui =

French Berber linguist

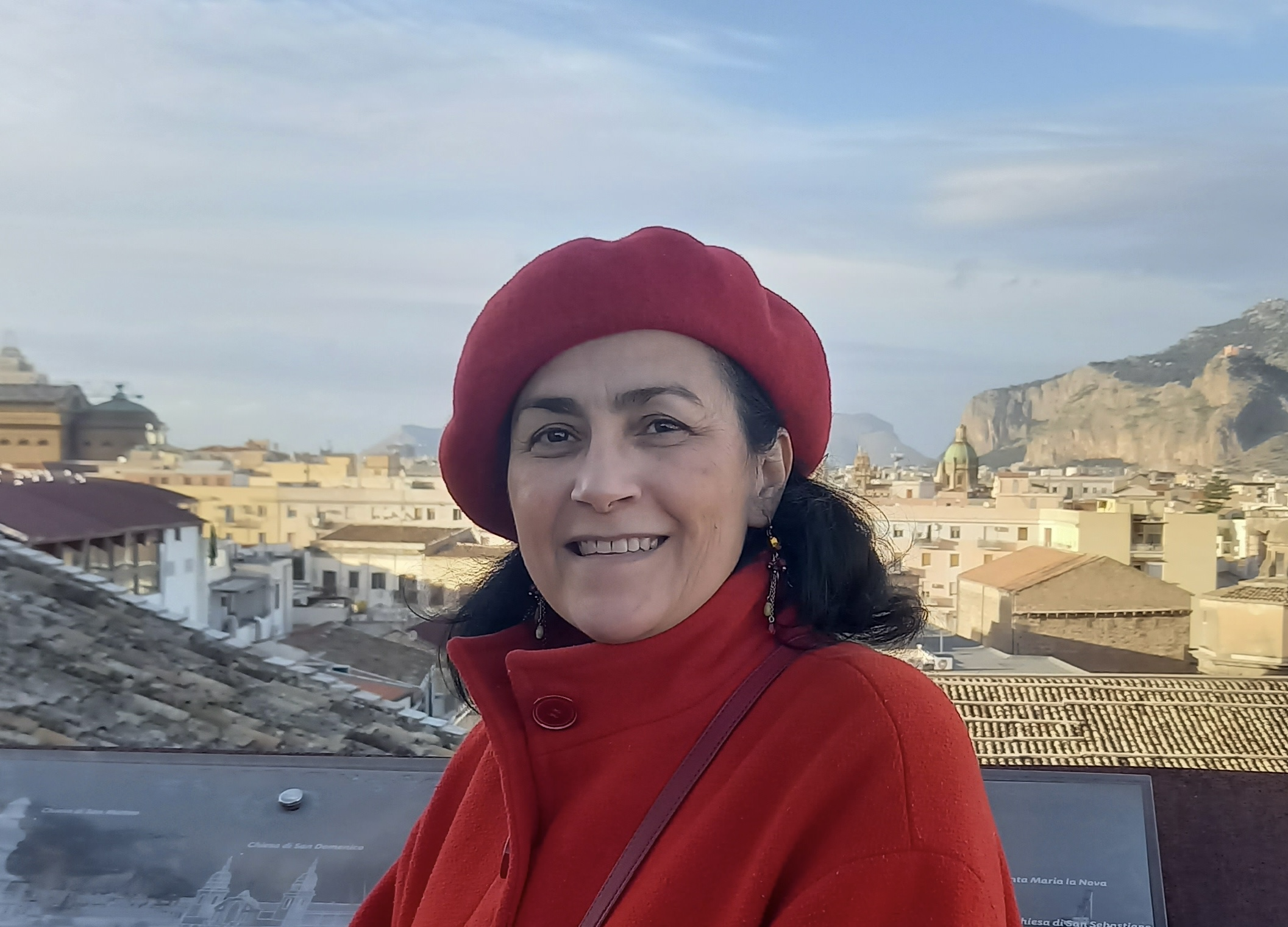
- Mena B. Lafkioui in 2023
- Title: Full Professor; Research Director; Chair Tamazight Linguistics

Academic background
- Thesis: Syntaxe intégrée de l'énoncé non-verbal berbère: Rifain d'Ayt Wayagher, Maroc du Nord (1999)
- Website: https://www.ehess.fr/fr/personne/mena-b-lafkioui https://ehess.academia.edu/MenaLafkioui

Mena B. Lafkioui is a linguist specializing in Tamazight linguistics. She is currently Research Director at the French National Centre for Scientific Research and Full Professor (Director of Studies) of Tamazight Linguistics at the School for Advanced Studies in the Social Sciences.

== Education and career ==
Lafkioui received her PhD at the National Institute for Oriental Languages and Civilizations (INALCO) in Paris, France, in 1999 with a thesis entitled, "Syntaxe intégrée de l'énoncé non-verbal berbère: Rifain d'Ayt Wayagher, Maroc du Nord". She subsequently worked at INALCO as a postdoctoral researcher, as well as at Ghent University in Belgium (1999–2000) and Leiden University in the Netherlands (2001–2004). In 2005 she took up a research professorship at the University of Calabria in Italy, before being appointed senior research professor at the University of Milano-Bicocca in 2008. She left this position in 2014 for her current position as director of research at the French National Centre for Scientific Research (CNRS) in Paris. In 2018 she was appointed Director of Studies at the School for Advanced Studies in the Social Sciences (EHESS).

== Research ==
Lafkioui has published widely on the linguistics of the Berber languages and Arabic, writing mainly in English and French. Her areas of interest include negation, information structure, sociolinguistics and dialectology. Her magnum opus and most-cited work is her linguistic atlas of Berber varieties of the Rif: this has been described as "the most extensive atlas of dialect variation in Berber ever published" and "an essential reference for anyone interested in linguistic variation within Berber or across North Africa as a whole".

== Honors ==
She has been an ordinary member of the Academia Europaea since 2013.

== Selected publications ==
- Lafkioui, Mena B. 1996. La négation en tarifit (Negation in Tarifit). In Salem Chaker and Dominique Caubet (eds.), La négation en berbère et en arabe maghrébin (Negation in Berber and Maghrebi Arabic), 49–77. Paris: L'Harmattan.
- Lafkioui, Mena B. 2007. Atlas linguistique des variétés berbères du Rif (Linguistic atlas of Berber varieties of the Rif). Cologne: Rüdiger Köppe. ISBN 978-3-89645-395-2
- Lafkioui, Mena B. 2013. Reinventing negation patterns in Moroccan Arabic. In Mena B. Lafkioui (ed.), African Arabic: Approaches to Dialectology, 51–94. Berlin: Mouton de Gruyter.
- Lafkioui, Mena B. 2013. Multilingualism, multimodality and identity construction on French-Based Amazigh (Berber) websites. Revue francaise de linguistique appliquee (French Review of Applied Linguistics) 18(2), 135–151.
