= Bram van Leeuwen =

Dutch businessman

Abraham "Bram" van Leeuwen, also known as Prince of Lignac (Rotterdam, 18 July 1918 – Málaga, 27 May 2001) was a Dutch businessman and high-profile millionaire.

== Poor start ==
Van Leeuwen grew up in Rotterdam under impoverished circumstances. The humiliation that he and only just one other kid had to borrow his schoolbooks made a big impression on him. This memory was one of the reasons Van Leeuwen promised himself to become rich and successful in life. He founded NTI: Nederlands Talen Instituut, one of the first language training companies. Just before and during World War II Van Leeuwen wrote an English training course – which was in great demand at that time. To receive permission from the German occupiers to start his company he was forced to develop a German course as well. He also founded Lecturama, a Dutch publisher specialized in collecting and (re)publishing special series and popular books and doing so making these publications obtainable for the mass market. After the war Van Leeuwen continued starting companies.

Van Leeuwen sold NTI and Lecturama to the Dutch Vendex concern in the 1970s for 300 million Dutch guilders.

== Lifestyle ==
Van Leeuwen was seen as an eccentric member of the jet set, living on board of his mega-yacht New Horizon L built by Feadship/Royal van Lent shipyard. He received many guests on board of this 60 meter long ship, where even the air-outlets are said to be solid gold. Rumors say Van Leeuwen bought the title Prince de Lignac but he always denied this and claimed he received it from a prince he met during the war. According again to Van Leeuwen his title was acknowledged by the São Paulo Aristocracy Court in 1966.

Van Leeuwen was openly homosexual, which was extremely controversial in the years immediately following World War Two. This openness drew substantial attention from gossip magazines, as did his penchant for hosting extremely lavish parties, and the fact that the servants on his yacht were exclusively Asian males; when asked why he hired only Asian males for these positions, van Leeuwen said only that they "serve the best".

== Death ==
Van Leeuwen died on his yacht at the age of 82 years. In his will Van Leeuwen left a small part of his fortune to his longtime partner Hans Verver (Euro 35 million + the yacht). The majority (Euro 100 million) was left to the Stichting Van Leeuwen Van Lignac. This foundation aims to help the physical and mental health of the people of Rotterdam, focusing on the elderly and/or lonely people and young children and orphans.
