= Salceson =

Central and Eastern European sausage

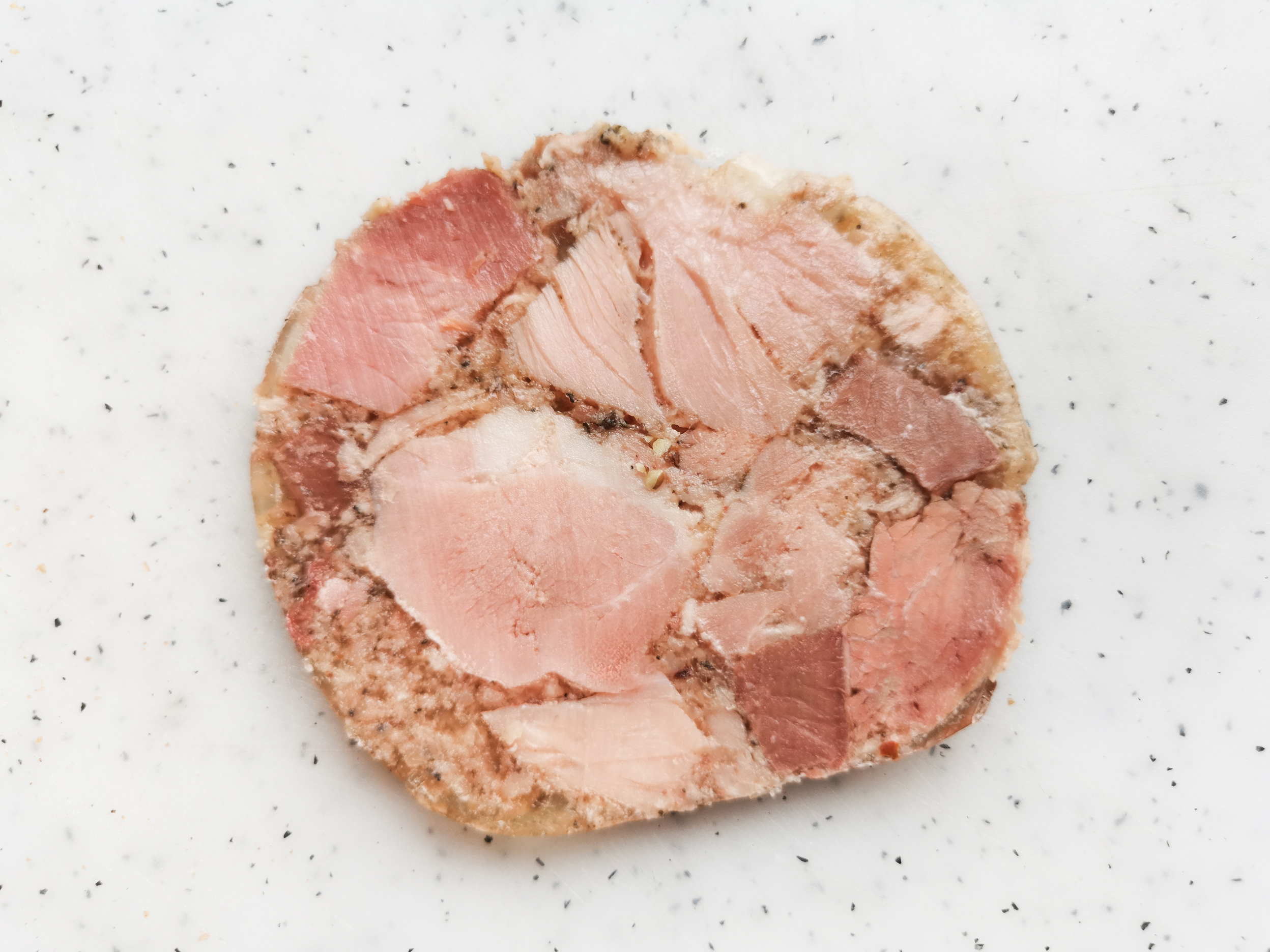
Salceson

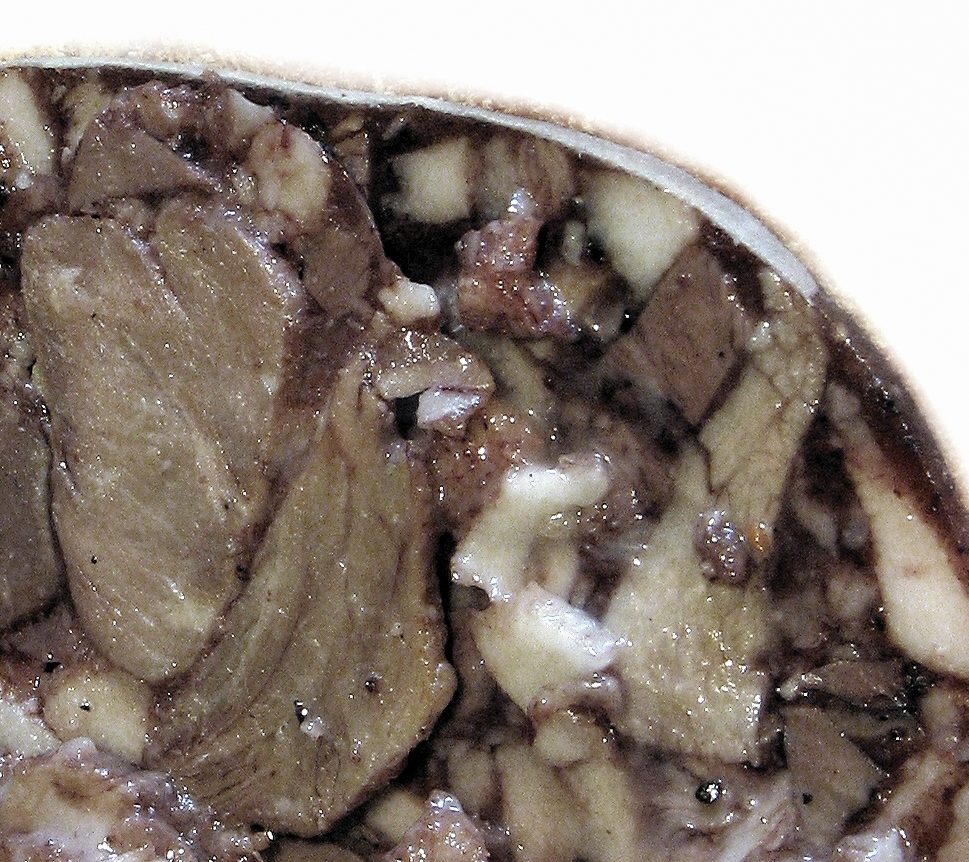
Salceson czarny (black)

Salceson is a type of meat found in Polish cuisine and other Central and Eastern European cuisines. There are several varieties of salceson which depend on the ingredients.

== Varieties ==
- Black 'Salceson' which contains blood
- White 'Salceson' made with a mixture of seasoned meats, without blood
- Ozorkowy (Tongue) 'Salceson' where the major meat component is tongue
- Włoski (Italian) 'Salceson' (brawn, skins, spices - garlic, pepper and caraway)
- Norweski (Norwegian) 'Salceson' (brawn, skins, broth, salmon, spices)
- Saksoński (Saxon) 'Salceson' (brawn, skins, broth, blood, offal, garlic, caraway, spices)
- Veal 'Salceson' (veal brawn and skins, broth, spices)
- Czosnkowy (Garlic) 'Salceson' (brawn, skins, broth, garlic)
- Północny (Northern) 'Salceson' (brawn, pork skin, blood, broth, garlic, liver, spices)
- Podlaski 'Salceson' (pork brawn, broth, chives, caraway, spices)

Typical ingredients: pork or veal tongues (cured), pork jowl, skins, pork liver.

The most popular type is white salceson, which can be bought from most butchers in Poland and in many grocery shops and supermarkets.

== See also ==
- Tlačenka
- Tobă
- Aspic
