= Marcellino van der Leeuw =

Dutch footballer

Marcellino van der Leeuw (born 15 June 1990 in Rotterdam) is a Dutch footballer who played for club Sparta Rotterdam during the 2009-2011 football seasons.
