= Pieter van der Leeuw =

Dutch painter

Pieter van der Leeuw (1647, in Dordrecht – 1679, in Dordrecht) was a Dutch Golden Age landscape painter.

According to Houbraken he was the son of Bastiaan Govertsz van der Leeuw and the younger brother of Govert van der Leeuw. He entered the Dordrecht painter's guild Pictura in 1669 and was regent when Houbraken himself entered in 1678.

According to the RKD he married in 1674 and became regent of the guild the same year. He is known for italianate landscapes in the manner of Adriaen van de Velde.
