= Tlačenka =

Czech and Slovak meat dish with brawn

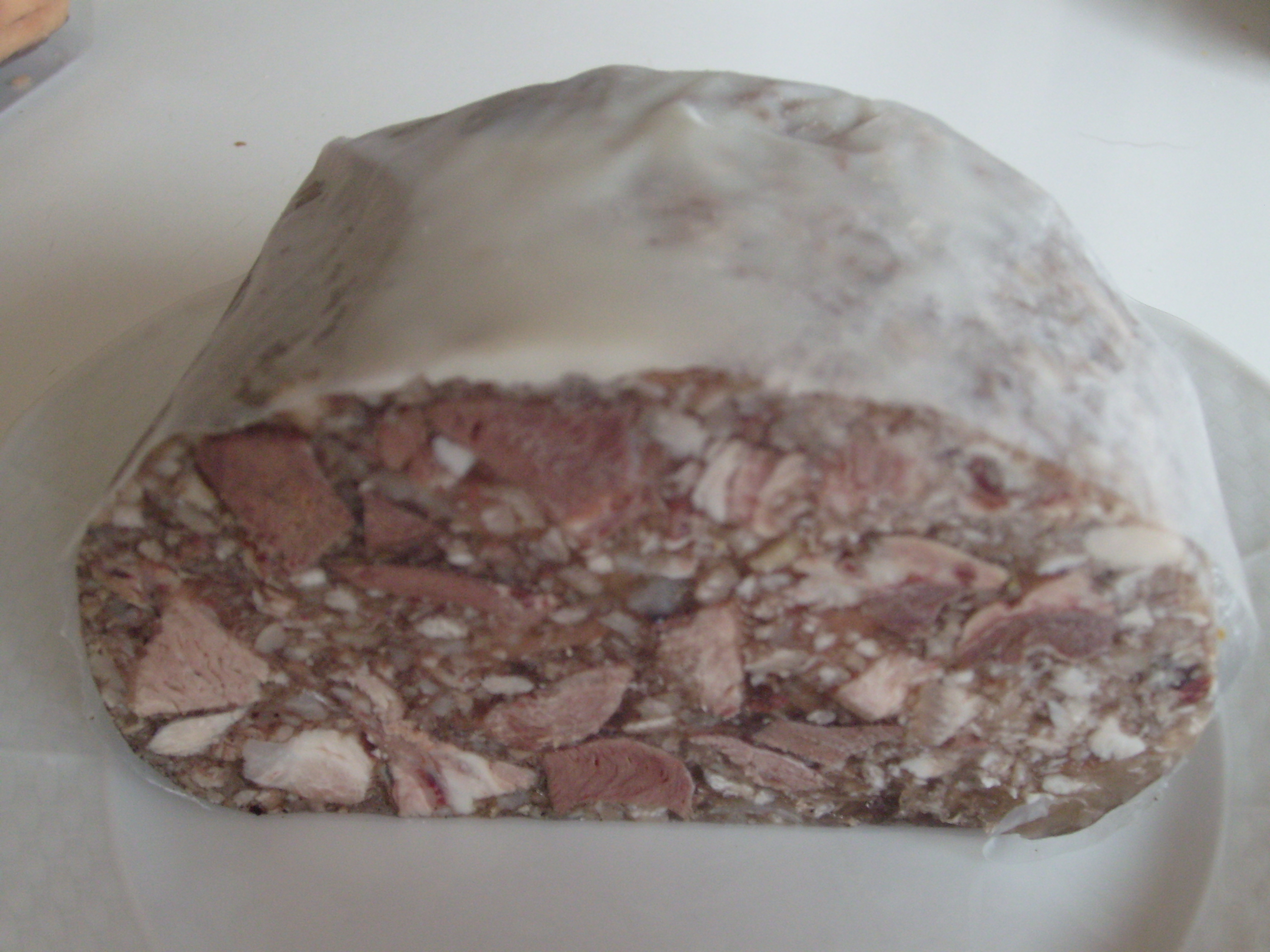
Tlačenka

Tlačenka is the Czech and Slovak variety of head cheese similar to Polish salceson. Czech light-colored tlačenka is made in a number of types. It is generally bonded with brawn—thick pigskin and hock/trotters broth—with various combinations of meat cutoffs (i.e. knuckle, head), offal (tongue, heart, liver) and fat with seasoning (salt and various combinations of spices such as marjoram, garlic, caraway, pepper, cloves, and allspice). Another version, dark-colored tlačenka, is made with added blood.

It is served with raw onions, rye bread, vinegar, mustard or smoked sausages.
