= Mineke Schipper =

Dutch writer (born 1938)

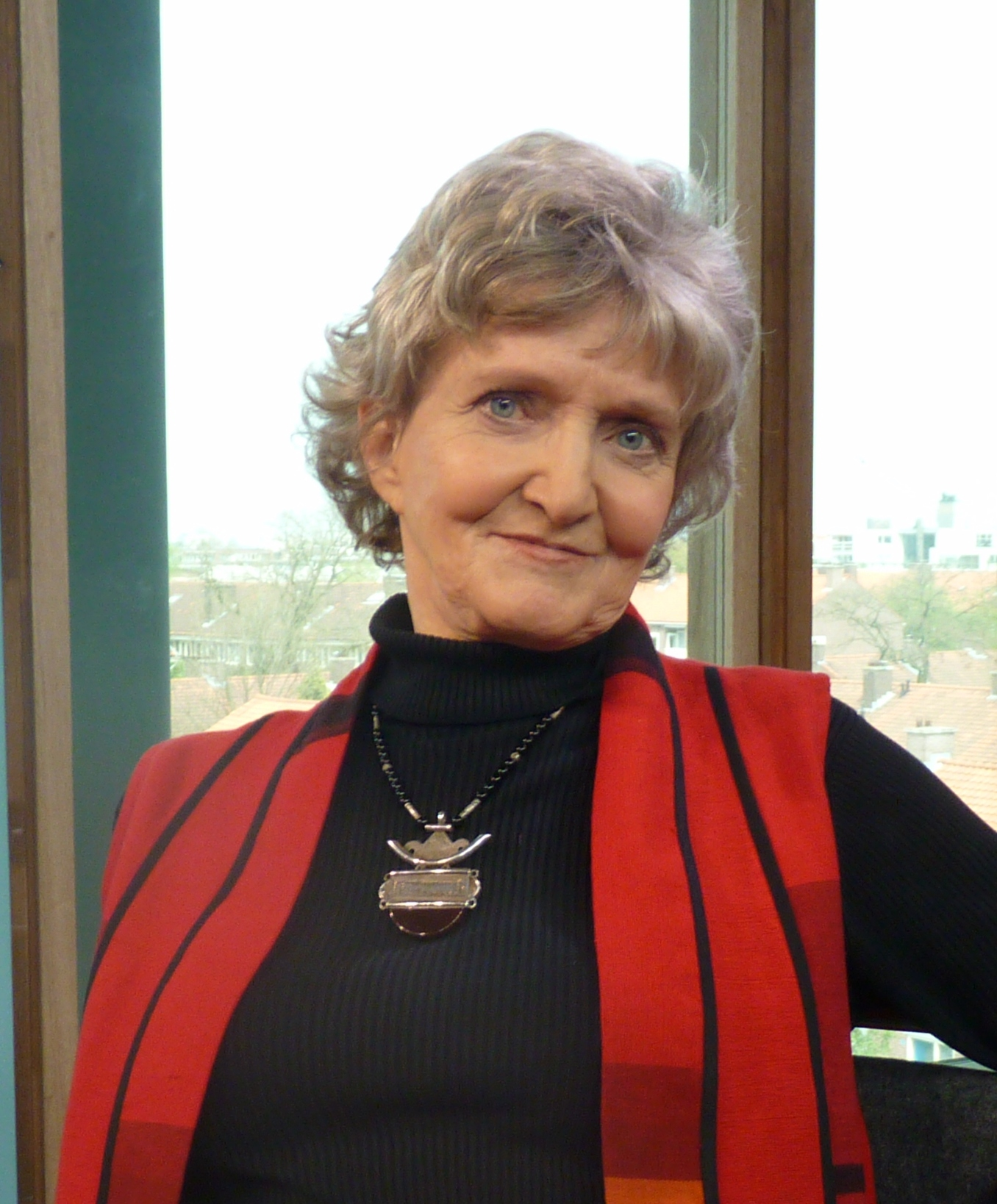
- Schipper (2012)
- Born: Wilhelmina Janneke Josepha de Leeuw; 6 December 1938 (age 87); Polsbroek, Utrecht
- Education: Vrije Universiteit Amsterdam, Universiteit Utrecht
- Occupation: Writer
- Writing career
- Subject: literature
- Notable work: Never Marry a Woman with Big Feet: Women in Proverbs From Around the World
- Website: minekeschipper.nl/en

Mineke Schipper (née Wilhelmina Janneke Josepha de Leeuw; born 6 December 1938 in Polsbroek) is a Dutch author of non-fiction and fiction. As a scholar she is best known for her work on comparative literature mythologies and intercultural studies.

== Description of the author ==
Thanks to her critical global perspective, Schipper has given an important impulse to the field of intercultural literary studies. Making her views accessible to both academic and non-academic audiences, she lectures not only at universities and scientific institutes (Berkeley, Beijing, Pretoria. Stockholm), but also to audiences outside the academy, such as policy makers in The Hague or Brussels.

She has also addressed a thousand rural women in the Amsterdam RAI congress centre; Jewish women in a synagogue in Leiden; a Muslim audience in a mosque in Nairobi; Egyptian folklorists in Cairo; and Cultural Institutes from Curaçao to Cambodia.

== Education ==
Mineke Schipper studied French and Philosophy at Amsterdam Free University and Literary Theory, followed by Comparative Literary Studies at the University of Utrecht. She started her career teaching French and African Literature at the Université Libre du Congo (between 1964 and 1972). She received her PhD in Amsterdam in 1973, writing the first thesis in the Netherlands on African literature) and dedicated herself to developing the field of intercultural literary studies. In 1988, she became the first Professor of Intercultural Literary Studies in the Netherlands, at the Free University of Amsterdam. In 1993, she moved to Leiden University, where she played a dynamic role in building intercultural bridges in researching and lecturing comparative literature in a global context.

In 1999, she received an honorary doctorate from Chengdu University (Sichuan Province) in China. Since 2000 she has been regularly invited by the Chinese Academy of Social Sciences (CASS) where she collaborates with colleagues on projects about epics and creation myths. In December 2008, she gave her farewell address at the University of Leiden.

Mineke Schipper lives in Amsterdam.

== Recognition ==
Her work on global oral traditions, proverbs, myths and creation mythologies has drawn significant attention. For her internationally acclaimed book Never Marry a Woman with Big Feet – Women in Proverbs from Around the World (hardback Yale University Press, 2004; paperback Amsterdam University Press and University of Chicago Press, 2006) she received the Eureka Award 2005 (academic book best accessible to a large audience). The book has been published in a number of languages and editions, which include Chinese, Turkish, Spanish, Arabic, Korean, Portuguese, and her interactive website contains more than 15,000 searchable proverbs about women from all over the world.

== Fiction ==
Mineke Schipper is also a fiction writer. Her three novels (in Dutch) are all set in the context of globalisation. Her 2007 novel Vogel valt vogel vliegt (Bird Falls Bird Flies Amsterdam: Prometheus) was praised by Nobel Prize winner J. M. Coetzee as "an absorbing story of the growth of adult love, and the letting go of past love, in the shadow of America’s imperial wars."

Besides novels, essays and academic books in various languages, she also publishes in general Dutch and international newspapers and magazines, among them NRC-Handelsblad, The Times, El Mundo, The Los Angeles Times, Birgün (Turkey) and Ex-Change (Hong Kong).

== Selected publications ==
- (in English) China's Creation and Origin Myths. Cross-cultural Explorations in Oral and Written Traditions. Ed. by Mineke Schipper, Ye Shuxian and Yin Hubin. Leiden: Brill Publishers, 2011. ISBN 90-04-19485-1
- (in English) Markham H. Geller & Mineke Schipper (eds): Imagening Creation. Leiden: Brill Publishers, 2008. ISBN 9789004157651
- (in English and Chinese) Mineke Schipper & Hubin Yin (ed.): Epics and Heroes in China's Minority Cultures. Guangxi & Beijing: Guangxi Normal University Press, 2004. ISBN 7-5633-4820-4
- (in English) Mineke Schipper: Never Marry a Woman with Big Feet. Women in Proverbs From Around the World. New Haven: Yale University Press, 2003. ISBN 0-300-10249-6
- (in English) Mineke Schipper: Imagining Insiders. Africa and the Question of Belonging. London & New York: Cassell, 1999. ISBN 0-304-70479-2
- (in English) Mineke Schipper: Source of All Evil. African Proverbs and Sayings on Women. London: Allison & Busby, 1991. ISBN 0-85031-863-7
- (in English) Mineke Schipper: Beyond the Boundaries. Text and Context in African Literature. Chicago: Dee, 1990. ISBN 0-929587-36-7
- (in English) W.J.J. Schipper, W.L. Idema, H.M. Leyten: White and Black. Imagination and Cultural Confrontations. Amsterdam: Royal Tropical Institute, 1990. ISBN 90-6832-810-7
- (in English) Unheard Words. Women and Literature in Africa, the Arab world, Asia, the Caribbean and Latin America. Ed. by Mineke Schipper. London: Allison & Busby, 1985. ISBN 0-85031-639-1
- (in English) Mineke Schipper: Theatre and Society in Africa. Johannesburg: Ravan Press, 1982. ISBN 0-86975-135-2
- (in English) Text and Context. Methodological Explorations in the Field of African Literature. Ed. by Mineke Schipper-de Leeuw. Leiden: Afrika-Studiecentrum, 1977. ISBN 90-70110-16-4
- (English) "Who Am I?": Fact and Fiction in African First-Person Narrative in African Literature: An Anthology of Criticism and Theory, 1989.
- (in French) Mineke Schipper: Theatre et societe en Afrique. Dakar: Nouvelles Editions Africaines, 1984. ISBN 2-7236-0960-X
- (in French) M. Schipper-de Leeuw: Perspective narrative et recit Africain à la première personne. Leiden: Afrika-Studiecentrum, 1976. No ISBN
- (in French) Mineke Schipper-de Leeuw: Le blanc et l'Occident. Au miroir du roman négro-africain de langue française (des origines au festival de Dakar: 1920-1966). Assen: Van Gorcum, 1973. ISBN 90-232-1105-7
- (in German) Mineke Schipper: Heirate nie eine Frau mit großen Füßen. Frauen in Sprichwörtern. Eine Kulturgeschichte. Frankfurt am Main: Eichborn, 2007. ISBN 978-3-8218-5624-7
- (in German) Mineke Schipper: Eine gute Frau hat keinen Kopf. Europäische Sprichwörter über Frauen. München: Deutscher Taschenbuch Verlag, 1996. ISBN 3-423-30521-5

== Sources ==
- Libellus amicorum voor Mineke Schipper (Red. Hedda Maria Post, Daniela Merolla et al.). Leiden, Zoetermeer, FWA Wensholt, 2008. No ISBN.
