= Bastiaan Govertsz van der Leeuw =

Dutch painter

Bastiaan Govertsz van der Leeuw (11 January 1624 – 20 December 1680]) was a Dutch Golden Age landscape painter.

According to Houbraken he was the father of Govert van der Leeuw. He was born at Dordrecht where he became a pupil of Jacob Gerritsz Cuyp. He did well as a painter of live animals such as cows and sheep, but he gave up painting and he became a collector of the excise duties on beer, living at Dordrecht till his death.

According to the RKD he was a pupil of the painter Jacob Gerritsz. Cuyp in 1638 and became the father of the artists Govert and Pieter van der Leeuw. He died, aged 56, in his home city of Dordrecht.
