= Nonnevot =

Sweet and Salty Limburgian pastry

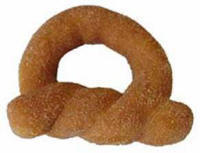
- Alternative names: Strik/sjtrik; Poeffel
- Type: Doughnut
- Place of origin: Netherlands
- Region or state: Limburg
- Main ingredients: Flour, yeast, milk, butter, brown sugar, lard

Nonnevot (also: strik or poeffel) is a Limburgian pastry dating back to the 17th century. Hailing from the town of Sittard, the pastry has traditionally been associated with carnival (Limburgian: Vastelaovend) but is nowadays sold year-round in regional bakeries. Its name: nonnevot, or nun's buttocks, comes from the knotted shape of the pastry, resembling the knot on the back of a nun's tunic. The nonnevot is prepared by deep-frying a mixture of flour, yeast, milk, salt, butter, brown sugar, and lard.

== See also ==
- List of doughnut varieties
- List of fried dough varieties
