= Leeuwen =

Coordinates: 51°53′9″N 5°31′55″E

Leeuwen is a former municipality consisting two villages of Beneden-Leeuwen and Boven-Leeuwen, now in the municipality of West Maas en Waal, in the Dutch province of Gelderland .

Leeuwen was a separate municipality until 1818, when it was merged with Wamel.
