= Pekpol =

Pekpol Ostrołęka S.A.
- Company type: Joint-stock company
- Industry: Food
- Founded: 1974; 52 years ago
- Headquarters: Ława, Poland
- Area served: Poland
- Key people: Tomasz Łączyński
- Products: Meat
- Website: www.pekpol.pl

Pekpol is a corporate group of enterprises specialised in the food industry of meat products, with its headquarters based in Ława near Ostrołęka in Poland. The company handles the production and distribution of bacon, thin and thick kiełbasa, sausages and mortadella, deli meats and block meat products.

== History ==
Zakłady Mięsne Pekpol Ostrołęka was founded in 1974. Since its foundation, the production process has been modernised and has become fully automatised. The production plants dispose of an advanced mechanisation process including a red meat cutting-up belt, a line for lunch meat slicing as well as a line for the packaging of products. The firm offers meat produce in 190 different varieties.

== Distribution ==
Pekpol Ostrołęka products cover the entire Polish market, merchandising in local and retail stores: Makro, Kaufland, Intermarché and Netto. Apart from the national market, the company exports around the European market, inter alia in Estonia, Germany, France, Netherlands, Sweden, the United Kingdom, Ireland, the Czech Republic as well as in Lithuania, Latvia and Hungary.

Pekpol Ostrołęka holds the following certificate regulations for standards of quality control: British Retail Consortium, International Food Standard and HACCP.

== Brands and products ==
- Kurpiowskie – kiełbasa, prosciutto, pork chop, bacon, pâté, rejbak and lard.
- Ready Chicken and Ready Pork – pork hock, chicken wings, quarter-chicken, hock-with-bone and snack-size kabanosy.
- Prosciutto – Krotoszyn pork chop, boiled pork ham, village ham, mammoth ham, Ostrołęka ham, canned ham, block canned ham, Sopot prosciutto, gammon, bacon rouladen, vented bacon, smoked Dutch bacon, steamed Dutch bacon, sliced bacon, pork chop rouladen, garlic rouladen, vented pork chop, vented ham, hetman ham, Cygańska ham, conserved bacon.
- Kiełbasa
- Sausages and baloney
- Poultry products
- Cold cuts
- Dziarskie Jarskie / Ready Vege – celery pâté, lentil and carrot pâté, chickpea pâté, red bean pâté.
- Roast produce
- Oak roasted produce – oaken prosciutto, dry Krakowska kiełbasa, Podwawelska kiełbasa, scorched biała kiełbasa, kabanosy in a variety of spiced variants, village kiełbasa.
- Block and lunch meat products
- Meat products
