= Olive loaf =

Type of deli meat loaf stuffed with olives

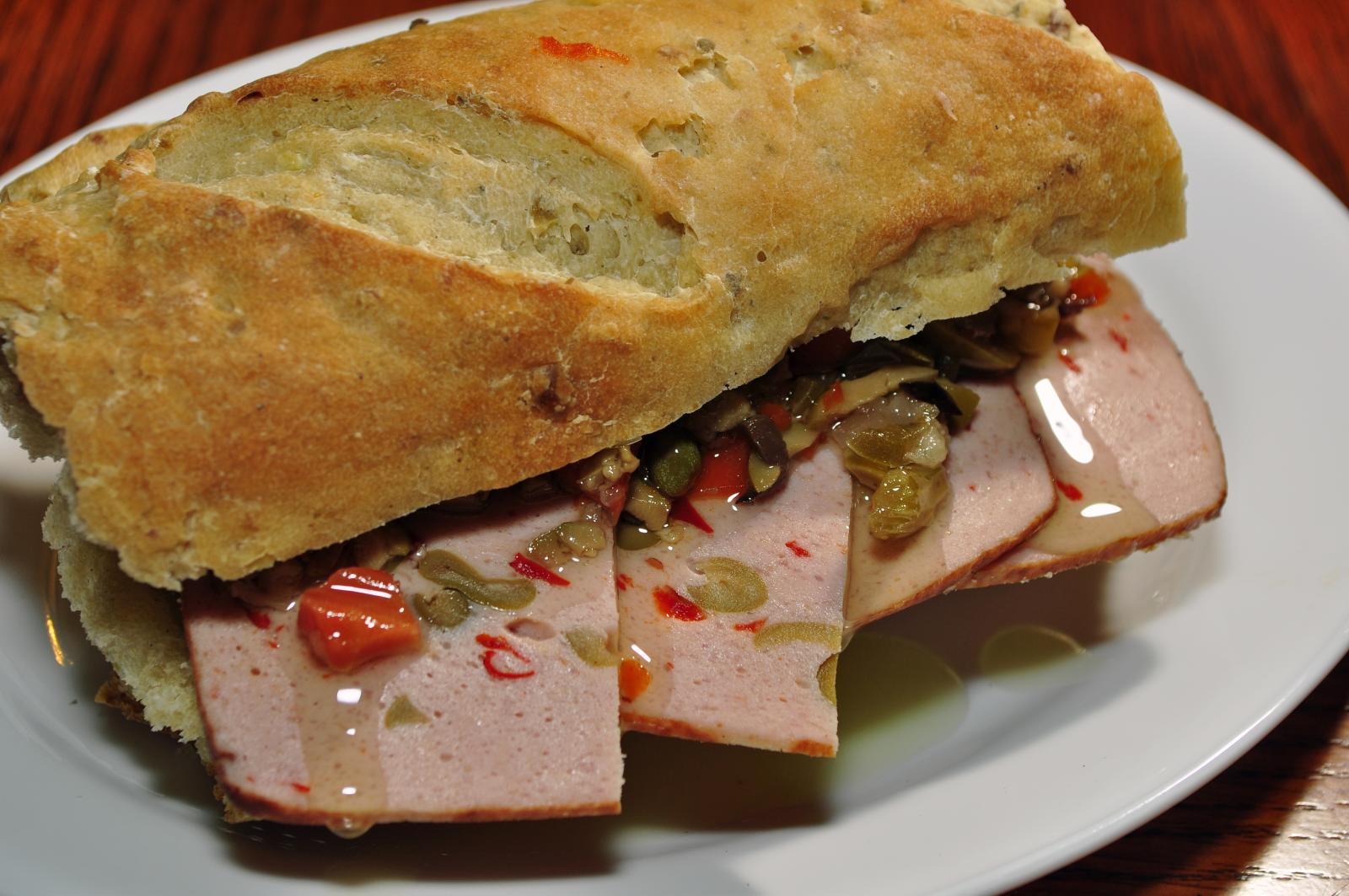
- Sliced olive loaf on a sandwich made with olive bread
- Type: Cold cut
- Course: Typically served as a sandwich filling or cold platter deli meat
- Place of origin: United States (derived from Italian charcuterie traditions)
- Serving temperature: Cold or at room temperature
- Main ingredients: Meat mixture (commonly beef, pork, and chicken) and pimiento-stuffed green olives

Olive loaf is a type of meatloaf or cold cut embedded with pimiento-stuffed green olives, similar to the Italian sausage meat mortadella.

The deli meat—typically a mixture of beef and pork, though chicken has also been used by meat producers such as Oscar Mayer—is prepared by incorporating green olives and spices such as mace, coriander, and pepper for flavor. Black olives are rarely used in place of green olives. Some recipes thicken the meat mixture with additives such as milk powder and soy flour to prevent the olives from sinking. It is often sold pre-sliced in standardized loaf form for retail packaging or deli counters.
