= Lunch meat =

Precooked or cured meats that are sliced and served cold or hot

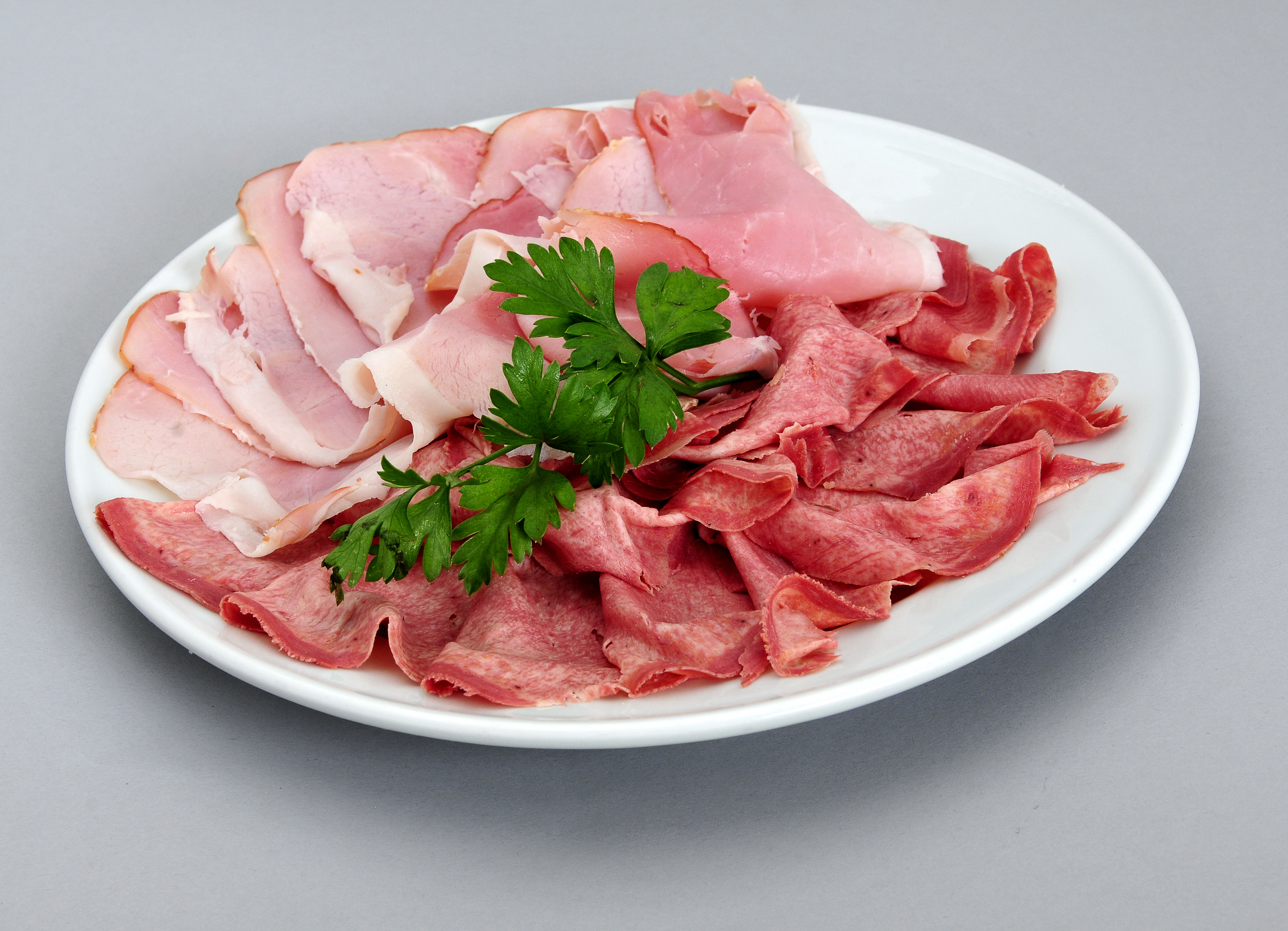
- A platter of cold cuts
- Alternative names: Cold cuts, luncheon meats, sandwich meats, cooked meats, sliced meats, cold meats, deli meats

Lunch meats—also known as cold cuts, luncheon meats, cooked meats, sliced meats, cold meats, sandwich meats, delicatessens, and deli meats—are cooked or cured meats that are sliced and served cold or hot. They are typically served in sandwiches or on their own. They can be purchased canned, sliced (usually in vacuum packs), or they can be sliced to order, most often in delicatessens and charcuteries.

Lunch meats are processed meats designed for convenience. Preservatives widely added to extend the shelf life have been increasingly scrutinized due to potential links to diseases. In the US, Listeria infection is possible and has resulted in additional guidelines from the CDC for the elderly.

== Types ==
- Bresaola
- Chicken breast
- Chicken loaf (also known as chicken roll)
- Corned beef
- Cotechino
- Ham
  - Baked
  - Boiled
  - Chipped chopped
  - Cooked
  - Éisleker
  - Jamón: serrano or ibérico
  - Presunto
  - Prosciutto
  - Smoked
- Head cheese
  - Salceson
- Meatloaf
  - Ham and cheese loaf
  - Olive loaf
  - Pepper loaf
  - Pimento loaf
  - Spiced luncheon loaf (also called old-fashioned loaf, and spiced lunch meat) is a luncheon meat made from coarse-ground lean pork and beef mixed with spices, formed into a loaf, and baked.
  - Veal loaf
- Mortadella
- Pork roll
- Roast beef
- Roast lamb
- Roast pork
- Sausages
  - Bierwurst or beerwurst
  - Blood tongue (Zungenwurst)
  - Bologna, Polony
    - Lebanon
  - Braunschweiger
    - Brühwurst
    - Mettwurst
  - Chorizo
  - Devon
  - Extrawurst
  - Gelbwurst
  - Jagdwurst
  - Krakowska (Kraków-style pork sausage)
  - Kabanos
  - Myśliwska
  - Liverwurst
  - Prasky
  - Morcilla
  - Salami
    - Alpino
    - Capocollo
    - Finocchiona
    - Italian-style
    - Jewish-style
    - Pepperoni
    - Soppressata
  - Salchichón
  - Saucisson sec (dry, maturing, salty, savoury-tasting French salami)
  - Sausagemeat stuffing
  - Summer sausage
  - Teewurst
- Smoked meat
  - Montreal-style smoked meat
  - Pastrami
- Tongue
- Turkey breast
- Spam and Treet

== Health ==
Most sliced lunch meats are higher in fat, nitrates, and sodium than those that are sliced to order, as a larger exposed surface requires stronger preservatives. Processed meats may significantly contribute to incidence of heart disease and diabetes, even more so than red meat.

A prospective study following 448,568 people across Europe showed a positive association between processed meat consumption and mortality caused by cardiovascular disease and cancer. A prospective study in the US following half a million people flagged a similar association between death and increased processed meat consumption. The World Cancer Research Fund International guidelines on cancer prevention recommend avoiding all processed meats.

== Safety ==
Deli lunch meat can be infected by Listeria. In 2011, the US Centers for Disease Control and Prevention (CDC) advises that those over age 50 reheat lunch meats to "steaming hot" 165 °F (74 °C) and use them within four days. In 2023, after a recent outbreak, the CDC advised that "people who are pregnant, aged 65 or older, or have a weakened immune system" reheat deli products in order to "kill any germs", even when there is no ongoing outbreak.

== See also ==
- Smallgoods
- Delicatessen
- Charcuterie
- List of dried foods
- List of sandwiches
- Dagwood sandwich
