= German trawler V 1523 Deltra I =

German fishing trawler

History
- Name: Oliva (1920); Gothmund (1920–33); Otto Telschow (1933–34); Baltrum (1934–38); Deltra I (1938–43); Oliva (1943–46); Deltra I (1946–51); Deltra (1951–57)
- Namesake: Gothmund, Otto Telschow; Baltrum
- Owner: Hochseefischerei Trave (1920–28); Hochseefischerei Cuxhaven AG (1928); F. Busse (1928–33); F. Kuhr (1933–34); Leege & Co. (1934–38); Polowy Dalekomorskie SA (1938–40); Kriegsmarine (1942–44); Polowy Dalekomorskie SA (1946–57)
- Port of registry: (Weimar Republic) Lübeck, Germany (1920–28); (Weimar Republic) Cuxhaven, Germany (1928–33); (Nazi Germany) Cuxhaven, Germany (1933-34); (Nazi Germany) Nordenham, Germany (1934–38); Dieppe, France (1938–40); (Nazi Germany) Hamburg, Germany (1940–42); Kriegsmarine (1943–43); (France) Dieppe (1946–57)
- Builder: Werft Nobiskrug GmbH
- Yard number: 98
- Launched: 25 March 1920
- Completed: 24 July 1920
- Commissioned: 1 June 1942
- Identification: Fishing boat registration LK 3 (1920–33); Code Letters PBSJ (1920–34); Fishing boat registration PG 412 (1933–34); Code Letters DRAO (1934–38, 1940–42); Fishing boat registration ON 156 (1934–38); Code Letters FPFW (1938-40, 1946–57); Fishing boat registration GDY 133 (1938–40); Fishing boat registration H 141 (1940–42); Pennant Number V 1523 (1942-43); Pennant Number V 215 (1943); Fishing boat registration GDY 126 (1946–51); Fishing boat registration GDY 219 (1951–57)
- Fate: Scrapped

General characteristics
- Type: Fishing trawler (1920–42, 1946–57); Vorpostenboot (1942–44)
- Tonnage: 251 GRT98 NRT
- Length: 39.40 m (129 ft 3 in)
- Beam: 7.34 m (24 ft 1 in)
- Draught: 2.92 m (9 ft 7 in)
- Depth: 3.90 m (12 ft 10 in)
- Installed power: Triple expansion steam engine
- Propulsion: Single screw propeller
- Speed: 10 knots (19 km/h)

Deltra I was a German fishing trawler that was requisitioned by the Kriegsmarine in the Second World War for use as a vorpostenboot. She was built in 1920 as Oliva and was renamed Gothmund in that year. She was renamed Otto Telschow in 1933, then Baltrum the next year and Deltra I in 1938.

Requisitioned in 1942, she served as V 1523 Deltra I and V 215 Oliva before being scuttled in 1944. She was raised post-war, repaired and returned to service as the Polish-owned, French-registered fishing trawler Deltra I. Renamed Deltra in 1951, she was scrapped in 1957.

== Description ==
The ship was 39.40 metres (129 ft 3 in) long, with a beam of 7.34 metres (24 ft 1 in). She had a depth of 3.90 metres (12 ft 10 in) and a draught of 2.92 metres (9 ft 7 in). She was assessed at 321 GRT, 126 NRT. She was powered by a triple expansion steam engine, which had cylinders of 32.5 centimetres (12 13/16 in), 52.5 centimetres (20 11/16 in) and 85 centimetres (33 1/2 in) diameter by 60 centimetres (23 3/4 in) stroke. The engine was built by the Görlitzer Maschinenfabrik, Görlitz, Germany. It was rated at 55nhp. It drove a single screw propeller, and could propel the ship at 10 knots (19 km/h).

== History ==
Oliva was built as yard number 98 by Werft Nobiskrug GmbH, Rendsburg, Germany for the Hochseefischerei Trave, Lübeck. She was launched on 25 March 1920 and completed on 24 July, on which date she was renamed Gothmund. The fishing boat registration LK 3 was allocated, as were the Code Letters PBSJ. On 1 January 1928, she was sold to the Hochseefischerei Cuxhaven AG. She was sold to F. Busse on 30 December 1928 and to F. Kuhr on 12 June 1933. She was renamed Otto Telschow, the fishing boat registration PG 412 was allocated. In April 1934, she was sold to Leege & Co, Nordenham and renamed Baltrum.fishing boat registration ON 156. In that year, her Code Letters were changed to DRAO. Baltrum was sold to the state-owned Polowy Dalekomorskie SA (DALMOR), Gdynia, Poland in 1938 and was renamed Deltra I. The Code Letters FPFW and fishing boat registration GDY 133 were allocated. Her port of registry was Dieppe, Seine-Inférieure, France. On 12 June 1940, her registration was changed to H 141. (Note: This registration is for Hamburg, indicating she had been captured by German forces)

On 1 June 1942, Deltra I was requisitioned by the Kriegsmarine for use as a vorpostenboot. She was allocated to 15 Vorpostenflotille, serving as V 1523 Deltra I. On 23 November 1943 she was allocated to 2 Vorpostenflotille, serving as V 215 Oliva. She was scuttled at Saint-Malo, Ille-et-Vilaine, France on 6 August 1944.

She was raised post-war and repaired. Returned to DALMOR, she became the fishing trawler Deltra I, registration GDY 126 on 7 August 1946. Her port of registry was Dieppe and her Code Letters were FPFW. On 14 August 1951, she was renamed Deltra, registration GDY 219. She was scrapped in Poland in September 1957.

== Notes and references ==
Notes

== Sources ==
- Gröner, Erich (1993). Die deutschen Kriegsschiffe 1815-1945 (in German). Vol. 8/I: Flußfahrzeuge, Ujäger, Vorpostenboote, Hilfsminensucher, Küstenschutzverbände (Teil 1). Koblenz: Bernard & Graefe. ISBN 3-7637-4807-5.
