= Kiełbaśnica =

Kiełbaśnica is an element of a female Polish national costume from the region of Upper Silesia dating back to the end of the 19th and the beginning of the 20th century. It is a long cylindrical linen cloth belt, around 5 to 10 centimeters in diameter, worn around a woman's hips.

Kiełbaśnica is stuffed with wool, feathers, cotton wool or cloth leftovers. On both ends of the belt there are sewn-in strings, used for tying it around one's hips. Its task is to make women look more attractive by widening their hips; thin women were considered sickly or poor at the beginning of the 20th century.

It also helps to fasten around the waist and hold the numerous skirts which are also parts of the national costume.

Its shape resembles kiełbasa, thus the name.
