= Quebec English =

English dialects in Quebec, Canada

- Region: Quebec, Canada
- Ethnicity: English-speaking Quebecers
- Native speakers: 640,000-1.1 million (L1); ~4.3 million (L2)
- Language family: Indo-European: Germanic; West Germanic; Ingvaeonic; Anglo-Frisian; Anglic; English; North American English; Quebec English
- Early forms: Old English: Middle English; Early Modern English
- Writing system: Latin (English alphabet); Unified English Braille

Language codes
- ISO 639-3: –
- Glottolog: cana1268
- IETF: en-u-sd-caqc

Quebec English (French: Anglais Québécois) encompasses the English dialects (both native and non-native) of the predominantly French-speaking Canadian province of Quebec. There are few distinctive phonological features and very few restricted lexical features common among English-speaking Quebecers. The native English speakers in Quebec generally align to Standard Canadian English, one of the largest and most relatively homogeneous dialects in North America. This standard English accent is common in Montreal, where the vast majority of Quebec's native English speakers live. English-speaking Montrealers have, however, established ethnic groups that retain certain lexical features: Irish, Jewish, Italian, and Greek communities that all speak discernible varieties of English. Isolated fishing villages on the Basse-Côte-Nord of Quebec speak Newfoundland English, and many Gaspesian English-speakers use Maritime English. Francophone speakers of Quebec (including Montreal) also have their own second-language English that incorporates French accent features, vocabulary, etc. Finally, the Kahnawake Mohawks of south shore Montreal and the Cree and Inuit of Northern Quebec speak English with their own distinctive accents, usage, and expressions from their indigenous languages.

== Quebec Anglophone English ==
The following are native-English (anglophone) phenomena unique to Quebec, particularly studied in Montreal English and spoken by the Quebec Anglophone minority in the Montreal area. Before the 1970s, minority-language English had the status of a co-official language in Quebec.

=== Phonology ===
Anglophone Montreal speaks Standard Canadian English, which has the Canadian Vowel Shift and Canadian raising, with some additional features:

- Resistance to the merry–marry merger: unlike the rest of typical North American English, Montreal English tends to maintain the distinction in words like Mary/merry versus marry, perish versus parish, and Erin versus Aaron. The vowels remain, as in traditional East-Coast American English and often British English, /ɛ/ and /æ/, respectively.
- The PRICE vowel is relatively backed.
- The "short a" or TRAP vowel is not raised before /g/ as elsewhere in Canada, but it is raised somewhat before /n/ for ethnic British and Irish Montrealers. Among other ethnicities, such as Jewish Montrealers, there may be no raising of the vowel in any context.
- The following vowel sounds are linguistically-conservative: the sets of vowels represented by the words GOAT (back and monophthongal), FACE (monophthongal), and MOUTH (back).

=== Vocabulary ===
Quebec English is heavily influenced by English and French. The phrases and words below show the variation of meaning in the Quebec English dialect.

Delay: an amount of time given before a deadline. "I was given a delay of 2 weeks before my project was due".

An animator: is not an artist but is someone who meets and entertains children.

A sweet carbonated beverage is commonly referred to as a "pop" in many parts of Canada, but in Montreal, it is a "soda" or "soft drink". A straight translation of the French liqueur douce.

A formation—this word in English would normally mean a routine stance used in a professional formation. (i.e. The men stood in formation). In Quebec a formation is a reference to an educational course or training session.

A pass—this phrase originates from Italian speakers, the word pass is often used in phrases such as "I am going to pass by a friend on the way to the movies". The phrase is comparatively used when you are already completing one action but can squeeze in another action on the way to your destination.

In standard English, the phrase "Your bus will pass in 2 minutes" would mean that you are about to miss your bus or that you have already missed your bus. Alternatively in Montreal the phrase pass can also mean to arrive or stop as a way to show that the action will happen in a relatively short time frame. Example: "Your bus will pass in 2 minutes".

Locations within the city are also commonly described using syntax borrowed from French. If a building is at the corner of St. Catherine and Peel streets in downtown Montreal, it may be described as being "on Saint Catherine, corner Peel." This is parallel to the French expression, "Sainte-Catherine, coin Peel" or "angle Peel".

=== French-language toponyms ===
English-speakers commonly use French-language toponyms and official names for local institutions and organizations with no official English names. The names are pronounced as in French, especially in broadcast media. Examples include the Régie du logement, the Collège de Maisonneuve, Québec Solidaire, the Parti québécois, Hochelaga-Maisonneuve, and Trois-Rivières.

- English toponyms in place of French (nonstandard when written): Older generations of English-speaking Montrealers are more likely to informally use traditional English toponyms that vary from official, French-language toponyms. In a notable generational distinction, it is uncommon among younger English-speaking Quebecers. Examples include Pine Avenue, Park Avenue, Mountain Street, Dorchester Blvd., St. James Street – often used without St., Blvd., Ave., Rd., etc. (names for the designations "avenue des Pins", "av. du Parc", "rue de la Montagne", "boulevard René-Lévesque", "rue S^{t}-Jacques"; the English-language official designations have reputedly been revoked, but evidence for that is difficult to find); Guy and Saint Catherine Streets; Town of Mount Royal, as it was chartered, and the charter has not been revoked; and Pointe Claire (pronounced [pwãɪ̯̃ ˈklaɛ̯ʁ] or [ˈpɔɪnt ˈklɛɹ] with English T and R and typography, instead of official "Pointe-Claire" with the French accent).

=== French loanwords ===
The use of a limited number of Quebec French terms for everyday place nouns (and occasional items) that have English equivalents; all of them are pronounced with English pronunciations or have undergone English clippings or abbreviations and so are regarded as ordinary English terms by Quebecers. At times, some of them tend to be preceded by the in contexts in which they would normally have a/an.

List of French loanwords

autoroute [ˌɒɾəˈɹuːt] instead of expressway
branché [bʁãˈʃeɪ̯] instead of trendy (colloquial)
chansonnier instead of songwriter
chez nous [ʃeɪ̯ ˈnuː] instead of "[at] our place"
the dep – instead of corner, variety, or convenience store; from dépanneur
coordinates instead of contact information
echo – ultrasound in reference to an échographie
epicerie – grocery store
fonctionnaire [ˌfõksjɔˈnɛːʁ] or [ˌfɒ̃ʊ̯̃ksjɔˈnaɛ̯ʁ] instead of civil servant
formation instead of training
the gallery – instead of balcony
garderie – nursery
the guichet [ɡiˈʃɛ] – instead of bank machine, even when all ATMs are labelled "ATM";
malaise - instead of malady or ailment
marché – market
the métro (or metro) instead of the subway, referring to rapid transit in urban areas; from the French chemin de fer métropolitain; metro is used outside Canada, though, as in the Washington Metro
nappe – a tablecloth
primary one, two, three, in contrast to Canadian English grade one, two, three etc.
resto – restaurant
the SAQ – the official name of the government-run monopoly liquor stores (pronounced "ess-ay-cue" or "sack"), the Société des alcools du Québec. That usage is similar to that in other provinces, like in neighbouring Ontario, where LCBO liquor stores are referred to as the "lick-bo" (for Liquor Control Board of Ontario).
secondary one, two, three, in contrast to Canadian English grade seven, eight, nine etc.
stage – apprenticeship or internship, pronounced as [staːʒ]
subvention – government grant or subsidy. The word exists in both French and English, but it is rarely heard in Canadian English outside Quebec.
tempo – driveway shelter in reference to the French commercial name Abris Tempo
terrasse [tɛˈʁas] – the French pronunciation and spelling of the translation for 'terrace' is common among anglophones in casual speech and is considered acceptable in semiformal expression such as journalism.
undertaking – business or enterprise

=== Pronunciation of French names ===
The pronunciation of French-language first and last names that uses mostly-French sounds may be mispronounced by speakers of other languages. For example, the pronounced "r" sound and the silent "d" of "Bouchard" may be both pronounced: /buːˈʃɑrd/. French-speakers and Quebec English-speakers are more likely to vary such pronunciations, depending on the manner in which they adopt an English phonological framework. That includes names like Mario Lemieux, Marie-Claire Blais, Jean Charest, Jean Chrétien, Robert Charlebois, and Céline Dion.

== Quebec Francophone English ==
Francophone second-language speakers of English use an interlanguage with varying degrees, ranging from French-accented pronunciation to Quebec Anglophone English pronunciation. High-frequency second-language phenomena by francophones, allophones, and other non-native-speakers occur in the most basic structures of English, both in and outside of Quebec. Commonly called "Frenglish" or "franglais", such phenomena are a product of interlanguage, calques, or mistranslation and thus may not constitute so-called "Quebec English" to the extent that they can be conceived of separately, particularly since such phenomena are similar for Francophone-speakers of English throughout the world.

=== Phonology ===
Francophones speaking English often pronounce [t]/[d] instead of [θ]/[ð], and some also pronounce [ɔ] for the phoneme [ʌ], some pronounce a full vowel instead of a schwa, such as [ˈmɛseɪdʒ] for message. Since French-speakers greatly outnumber English-speakers in most regions of Quebec, it is more common to hear French in public. Some Anglophones in overwhelmingly-Francophone areas use some of the features (especially the replacement of [θ] and [ð] by [t] and [d]), but their English is remarkably similar to that of other varieties of English in Canada (Poplack, Walker, & Malcolmson 2006).

== Other speakers ==
There is also a pronunciation (NP) of the phoneme /ŋ/ as /n/ + /ɡ/ (among some Italian Montrealers) or /n/ + /k/ (among some Jewish Montrealers, especially those who grew up speaking Yiddish), such as by high degrees of ethnic connectivity within, for instance, municipalities, boroughs, or neighbourhoods on Montreal Island, such as Saint-Léonard and Outremont/Côte-des-Neiges/Côte Saint-Luc. Such phenomena occur as well in other diaspora areas such as New York City.

=== Vocabulary and grammar ===
janitor – building superintendent.
country house – cottage (vacation home).

- The use of French collocations (NS):

Close the TV – Turn/shut off the TV.
Close the door. – Lock the door.
Open the light. – Turn on the lights.
Close the light. – Turn off the lights.
Take a decision. – Make a decision. (NB "Take" is the older British version. Compare French Prends/Prenez une décision)
Put your coat. – Put your coat on (from French Mets ton manteau/Mettez votre manteau).
Pass someone money. – Lend someone money.
Pass the vacuum. – Run the vacuum (or do the vacuuming)

- The use of French grammar (NS): Many of these constructions are grammatically correct but only out of context. It is both the calquing and linguistic transfer from French and the betrayed meanings that make these sentences foreign to English.

He speak/talk to me yesterday. – He spoke/talked to me yesterday. (verb tense)
Me, I work in Laval. – I work in Laval. (vocal stress on "I". From French Moi, je travaille à Laval.)
It/He have many books. – There are many books. (from French il y a meaning "there is/are")
I like the beef and the red wine. – I like beef and red wine. (overuse of definite article to mean "in general". From French J'aime le bœuf et le vin rouge.)
You speak French? – Do you speak French? (absence of auxiliary verb; otherwise it means surprise, disbelief or disappointment when out of context)
We were/are four. – There were/are four of us. (from French "nous sommes" and "nous étions")
We're Tuesday – It's Tuesday. (from French "nous sommes")
I don't find my keys. – I can’t find my keys. (lack of English modal auxiliary verb)
At this moment I wash the dishes. – I’m washing the dishes right now. (verbal aspect)
I can't join you at this moment because I eat. – I can't join you right now because I'm eating. (verbal aspect)
My computer, he don’t work. – My computer won’t work. (human pronoun, subject repetition, uninflected auxiliary verb)
I would like a brownies. – Could I have a brownie? (plural –s thought to be part of the singular word in relexification process; other examples: "a Q-tips", "a pins", "a buns", "a Smarties", "a Doritos", etc.)
I would like shrimps with broccolis. – Could I have some shrimp and broccoli? (use of regular plural instead of English unmarked plural or non-count noun; this is not a case of hypercorrection but of language transfer).
Do you want to wash the dishes? – Will/would you wash the dishes? (lack of English modal verb; modal vouloir from French instead – Voulez-vous faire la vaisselle?)
We have to go in by downstairs – We have to go in downstairs (via the non-standard French 'entrer par')
You're going to broke it! – You're going to break it! (mixing of homonymic French tenses; "cassé", past, versus "casser", infinitive)

- False cognates or faux-amis (NS): This practice is quite common, so much so that those who use them abundantly insist that the false cognate is the English term even outside of Quebec. Note that these French words are all pronounced using English sounds and harbour French meanings. While the possibilities are truly endless, this list provides only the most insidious false cognates found in Quebec.

a stage – an internship (pronounced as in French, from the French word for internship, "un stage".)
Cégep [seɪ̯ˈʒɛp] (cégep; collégial, cégepien) – the acronym of the public college network preceding university in Quebec.
Chinese pâté [t͡ʃʰaɪ̯ˈniːz pʰætʰˌeɪ̯] or [t͡ʃʰaɪ̯ˈniːz pʰɑːˌtʰeɪ̯] – shepherd's pie (pâté chinois; Quebeckers' pâté chinois is similar to shepherd's-pie dishes associated with other cultures)
a cold plate – some cold-cuts (reversed gallicism – assiette de viandes froides)
coordinates – for address, phone number, e-mail, etc.
(a) salad – (a head of) lettuce
a subvention – a (government) grant
a parking – a parking lot/space
a location – a rental
a good placement – a good location
That's it. – That is correct. (from C'est ça.)
all-dressed pizza – a deluxe pizza with pepperoni, mushrooms and green peppers (from pizza toute garnie.)
soup, two times – two soups, or two orders of soup (from "deux fois.")

Few anglophone Quebeckers use French grammar or false cognates, but many use French collocations and most understand such high-frequency words and expressions. Some of these cognates are used by many francophones, and others by many allophones and anglophone accultured in allophone environments, of varying English proficiencies, from the bare-minimum level to native-speaker level.

== See also ==
- English-speaking Quebecers
- Quebec French
- Canadian English
- Franglais
