= Pimento loaf =

Luncheon meat

- Alternative names: Pimento loaf
- Type: Loaf-type luncheon meat
- Main ingredients: Beef and pork, pickles and pimientos
- Similar dishes: Olive loaf

Pimento loaf, also pimiento loaf, is a baked loaf-type luncheon meat containing finely chopped beef and pork, accented with chopped pickles and pimientos. It is kept whole so it can be sliced and served cold as deli meat. Pimento loaf is closely related to the somewhat more expensive olive loaf, which features pimento-stuffed olives, and spiced luncheon loaf.

Inexpensive pimento loaf is made with chicken and other ingredients common to inexpensive bologna. Also, less expensive pimento loaves are baked in sleeves instead of pans to give the cold cuts a round appearance, leading to the misconception that pimento loaf is related to bologna.
