= List of state-owned enterprises of Poland =

This is a list of Polish government-owned companies:

- Centrala Zbytu Węgla Węglozbyt S.A.
- Centralna Stacja Ratownictwa Górniczego SA.
- Centrum Badań i Dozoru Górnictwa Podziemnego Sp. z o.o
- Elektrociepłownia Będzin S.A.
- ENEA S.A.
- ENERGA SA.
- Fabryka Elementów Złącznych S.A.
- Fabryka Przewodów Energetycznych S.A.
- Grupa LOTOS S.A.
- HUTA ŁABĘDY S.A.
- HUTMAR S.A.
- Instytut Automatyki Systemów Energetycznych Sp. z o.o.
- Jastrzębska Spółka Węglowa S.A.
- Jastrzębskie Zakłady Remontowe Sp. z o.o.
- JSW KOKS S. A.
- Katowicki Holding Węglowy S.A.
- KGHM Polska Miedź S.A.
- Kopalnia Soli Wieliczka S.A.
- Kopalnia Soli Bochnia Sp. z o.o.
- Kopalnie Surowców Mineralnych KOSMIN Sp. z o.o.
- LOTOS PETROBALTIC S.A.
- PGE Polska Grupa Energetyczna S.A. PGE Capital Group
- Polska Grupa Górnicza Sp. z o.o.
- Polska Grupa Zbrojeniowa (Polish Armaments Group)
- Polski Koncern Naftowy ORLEN S.A.
- Polskie Górnictwo Naftowe i Gazownictwo S.A.
- Przedsiębiorstwo Przeładunku Paliw Płynnych NAFTOPORT Sp. z o.o.
- PSK Rzeszów Sp. z o.o.
- SIARKOPOL Gdańsk S.A.
- Spółka Restrukturyzacji Kopalń S.A.
- Rafineria Nafty GLIMAR S.A.
- Regionalny Fundusz Gospodarczy S.A.
- TAURON Polska Energia S.A.
- Towarzystwo Finansowe Silesia Sp. z o.o.
- Walcownia Metali Nieżelaznych ŁABĘDY SA.
- Wałbrzyskie Zakłady Koksownicze Victoria S.A.
- Węglokoks S.A.
- Zakłady Urządzeń Chemicznych i Armatury Przemysłowej CHEMAR S.A.
- Zarządca Rozliczeń S.A.
- Zespół Elektrowni Wodnych Niedzica S.A.
- C.Hartwig Gdynia S.A.
- Centrum Techniki Okrętowej S.A.
- Chłodnia Szczecińska Sp. z o.o.
- DALMOR S.A.
- Polska Żegluga Bałtycka S.A.
- Polski Rejestr Statków S.A.
- Polskie Ratownictwo Okrętowe w Gdyni Sp. z o.o.
- Przedsiębiorstwo Budownictwa Hydrotechnicznego ODRA 3 Sp. z o.o.
- Przedsiębiorstwo Budownictwa Wodnego w Warszawie S. A.
- Przedsiębiorstwo Budownictwa Wodnego w Tczewie Sp. z o.o.
- Centrum Logistyczne GRYF Sp. z o.o.
- Przedsiębiorstwo Robót Czerpalnych i Podwodnych Sp. z o.o.
- Stocznia Gdańska S.A.
- Stocznia Gdynia S.A.
- STOCZNIA SZCZECIŃSKA NOWA Sp. z o.o.
- Stocznia Szczecińska Porta Holding S.A.
- Zarząd Morskich Portów Szczecin i Świnoujście S.A.
- Zarząd Morskiego Portu Gdańsk S.A.
- Zarząd Morskiego Portu Gdynia S.A.
- PKP Polskie Linie Kolejowe S.A.
- PKS-IWOPOL Sp. z o.o.
- POLBUS-PKS Sp. z o.o.
- Centrum Biurowe Plac Grunwaldzki S.A.
- Dolnośląskie Zakłady Usługowo -Produkcyjne DOZAMEL Sp. z o.o.
- Drogowa Trasa Średnicowa S.A.
- Gryf Nieruchomości Sp. z o.o.
- Nadwiślańska Spółka Mieszkaniowa Sp. z o.o.
- Nowe Centrum Administracyjne Sp. z o.o.
- OPAKOMET S.A.
- Ośrodek Badawczy Ekonomiki Transportu Sp. z o.o.
- PKS Mrągowo Sp. z o.o.
- PKS Nowy Targ Sp. z o.o.
- Poczta Polska S.A.
- Polski Holding Nieruchomości S.A.
- Polskie Koleje Państwowe S.A.
- Przedsiębiorstwo Budownictwa Przemysłowego CHEMOBUDOWA-KRAKÓW S.A.
- Przedsiębiorstwo Budowy Tras Komunikacyjnych TRAKT w Szczecinie Sp. z o.o.
- Przedsiębiorstwo Drogowo-Mostowe S.A.
- Przedsiębiorstwo Komunikacji Samochodowej
- Przedsiębiorstwo Państwowej Komunikacji Samochodowej w Zgorzelcu Sp. z o.o.
- Przedsiębiorstwo Przewozu Towarów Powszechnej Komunikacji Samochodowej S. A
- WARS S.A.
- Warszawski Holding Nieruchomości S.A.
- Wojewódzkie Przedsiębiorstwo Robót Drogowych S.A.
- Zakłady Chemiczne JELCHEM S.A.
- Zakłady Naprawcze Taboru Kolejowego w Oleśnicy S.A.
- Tomaszowskie Przedsiębiorstwo Budowlane TOMBUD S.A.
- Polska Agencja Prasowa S.A.
- Polskie Pracownie Konserwacji Zabytków S.A.
- Polskie Radio S.A.
- Przedsiębiorstwo Wydawnicze RZECZPOSPOLITA Sp. z o.o.
- Techfilm Sp. z o.o.
- Telewizja Polska S.A.
- Stomil-Poznań S.A.
- Huta Stalowa Wola S.A.
- MESKO S.A.
- Ośrodek Badawczo-Rozwojowy Centrum Techniki Morskiej S.A.
- Ośrodek Badawczo-Rozwojowy Przemysłu Oponiarskiego STOMIL Sp. z o. o.
- Polska Grupa Zbrojeniowa S.A.
- Polski Holding Obronny Sp. z o.o.
- ROSOMAK S.A.; part of Polska Grupa Zbrojeniowa (Polish Armaments Group)
- Stocznia Marynarki Wojennej S.A.
- Wojskowe Biuro Projektów Budowlanych Sp. z o.o.
- Wojskowe Centralne Biuro Konstrukcyjno-Technologiczne S.A.
- Wojskowe Przedsiębiorstwo Handlowe Sp. z o.o.
- Wojskowe Zakłady Elektroniczne S.A.; part of Polska Grupa Zbrojeniowa (Polish Armaments Group)
- Wojskowe Zakłady Inżynieryjne S.A.; part of Polska Grupa Zbrojeniowa (Polish Armaments Group)
- Wojskowe Zakłady Kartograficzne Sp. z o.o.
- Wojskowe Zakłady Lotnicze; part of Polska Grupa Zbrojeniowa (Polish Armaments Group)
- Wojskowe Zakłady Łączności; part of Polska Grupa Zbrojeniowa (Polish Armaments Group)
- Wojskowe Zakłady Motoryzacyjne S.A.; part of Polska Grupa Zbrojeniowa (Polish Armaments Group)
- Wojskowe Zakłady Uzbrojenia S.A.; part of Polska Grupa Zbrojeniowa (Polish Armaments Group)
- Zakłady Chemiczne NITRO-CHEM S.A.
- Zakład Przemysłu Odzieżowego CORA-TEX w Krasnymstawie S.A.
- Lubelski Rynek Hurtowy S.A.
- Rolno-Spożywczy Rynek Hurtowy S.A.
- Warszawski Rolno-Spożywczy Rynek Hurtowy S.A.
- Zielonogórski Rynek Rolno-Towarowy S.A.
- Beskidzki Hurt Towarowy S.A.
- Chłodnia Białystok S.A.
- Dolnośląskie Centrum Hurtu Rolno-Spożywczego S.A.
- Krajowa Spółka Cukrowa
- Małopolski Rynek Hurtowy
- Podkarpackie Centrum Hurtowe AGROHURT S.A.
- Podlaskie Centrum Rolno-Towarowe S.A.
- Pomorskie Hurtowe Centrum Rolno -Spożywcze S.A.
- Przedsiębiorstwo Przemysłu Ziemniaczanego Trzemeszno Sp. z o.o.
- Rolno-Przemysłowy Rynek Hurtowy GIEŁDA HURTOWA S.A.
- Rolno-Spożywczy Rynek Hurtowy Giełda Elbląska S.A.
- Stacja Hodowli i Unasieniania Zwierząt Sp. z o.o.
- Wałbrzyski Rynek Hurtowy S.A.
- Wielkopolska Gildia Rolno-Ogrodnicza S.A.
- Wielkopolskie Centrum Hodowli i Rozrodu Zwierząt w Poznaniu z siedzibą w Tulcach Sp. z o.o.
- Zakłady Przemysłu Ziemniaczanego w Pile ZETPEZET Sp. z o.o.
- ARELAN S.A.
- BINGO CENTRUM Sp. z o.o.
- Centrum Handlowe Wschód S.A.
- DRAGMOR Sp. z o.o.
- INOFAMA S.A.
- KORONKI S.A.
- POL-DRÓG Chojnice Sp. z o.o.
- POLMO GNIEZNO Sp. z o.o.
- PZZ AGRO-PIAST S.A.
- SPOMASZ Bełżyce S.A.
- SUPON USŁUGI Sp. z o.o.
- Uzdrowisko Rabka S.A.
- Agencja Kapitałowo-Rozliczeniowa S.A.
- Agencja Rozwoju Przemysłu S.A.
- Agencja Rozwoju Regionalnego S.A.
- Agencja Rozwoju Rolnictwa i Przemysłu Przetwórczego Regionu Raciborskiego S.A.
- AUTOSAN S.A.
- BEZETEN S.A.
- BGE S.A.
- Bielskie Przedsiębiorstwo Instalacji Sanitarnych BEPIS S.A.
- BIS-SUKCES Sp. z o.o.
- BondSpot S.A.
- Bydgoskie Zakłady Przemysłu Gumowego STOMIL S.A.
- CEFARM-RZESZOW S.A.
- Cegielnie Kutnowskie Sp. z o.o.
- Centrala Farmaceutyczna CEFARM S.A.
- Centralny Ośrodek Badawczo Rozwojowy Aparatury Badawczej i Dydaktycznej COBRABID) Sp. z o.o.
- Centrum Badawczo-Konstrukcyjne Obrabiarek Sp. z o.o.
- Centrum Produkcyjne Pneumatyki PREMA S. A.
- Chemia Polska Sp. z o.o.
- Chłodnia MORS-WOLA Sp. z o.o.
- CHMIEL POLSKI S.A.
- Cieszyńska Drukarnia Wydawnicza Sp. z o.o.
- Daewoo Motor Polska Sp. z o.o.
- Dolnośląskie Konsorcjum Handlowo-Finansowe S.A.
- Dom Hutników w Skierniewicach Sp. z o.o.
- DOM POLSKI S.A.
- Drukarnia Narodowa S.A.
- EHN S.A.
- ELEKTRIM - MEGADEX S.A.
- Elektromontaż Gdańsk S.A.
- ENERGOPOL-TRADE-INSTAL SA.
- EUROLOT S.A.
- Fabryka Aparatury Elektromedycznej Famed Łódź SA
- Fabryka Łączników Radom S.A.
- Fabryka Maszyn Introligatorskich INTROMA Sp. z o.o.
- Fabryka Maszyn w Leżajsku Sp. z o.o.
- Fabryka Obrabiarek do Drewna Sp. z o.o.
- Fabryka Przyrządów i Uchwytów BISON -BIAL S.A.
- Fabryka Szlifierek FAS Głowno Sp. z o.o.
- Fabryka Żarówek HELIOS Sp. z o.o.
- FAGUM-STOMIL S.A.
- Federal-Mogul BIMET S.A.
- FP SPOMAX S.A. z
- Fundusz Rozwoju Spółek S.A.
- Giełda Papierów Wartościowych w Warszawie S.A.
- Grupa Azoty Kopalnie i Zakłady Chemiczne Siarki SIARKOPOL
- GRUPA AZOTY S.A.
- Grupa Azoty Zakłady Azotowe Puławy S.A.
- Grupa Azoty Zakłady Chemiczne Police S.A.
- H.CEGIELSKI-POZNAŃ S.A.
- HOLAGRA Sp. z o.o.
- Hotele Olsztyn Sp. z o.o.
- Huta Kościuszko S.A.
- Huta BATORY S.A.
- Huta Metali Nieżelaznych
- Huta Ostrowiec S.A.
- Huta Szkła Artystycznego ZĄBKOWICE S.A.
- Huta Szkła Gospodarczego ZAWIERCIE SA
- Instytut Wzornictwa Przemysłowego Sp. z o.o.
- INWESTSTAR S.A.
- Kama Foods S.A.
- Kancelaria Gospodarcza ADIUTOR Sp. z o.o.
- Katowicka Specjalna Strefa Ekonomiczna S.A.
- Gremi Inwestycje S.A.
- Kieleckie Kopalnie Surowców Mineralnych S.A.
- KOFAMA Koźle S.A.
- Kombinat Budowlany Kołobrzeg Sp. z o.o.
- Kopalnie Odkrywkowe Surowców Drogowych Sp. z o.o.
- Korporacja Ubezpieczeń Kredytów Eksportowych S.A.
- Kostrzyńsko-Słubicka Specjalna Strefa Ekonomiczna S.A.
- Krajowy Depozyt Papierów Wartościowych S.A.
- Krakowski Park Technologiczny Sp. z o.o.
- Krakowskie Centrum Komunikacyjne Sp. z o.o.
- Krośnieńskie Huty Szkła KROSNO S.A.
- KRZYWA S.A.
- Laboratorium Inteligentnego Miasta i Innowacyjnej Gospodarki S.A.
- Legnicka Specjalna Strefa Ekonomiczna S.A.
- LEN S.A.
- LOGOTEC ENGINEERING S.A.
- LS Airport Services S.A.
- LUBINEX Sp. z o.o.
- Lubuskie Fabryki Mebli S.A.
- Łambinowicka Fabryka Maszyn Celpa S.A.
- Łódzka Specjalna Strefa Ekonomiczna S.A.
- Marina Hotele Service Sp. z o.o.
- MAXER S.A.
- Mazowieckie Konsorcjum Autostradowe S.A.
- Meprozet Kościan S.A.
- METALCHEM Sp. z o.o.
- METRON - NIGA Sp. z o.o.
- METRON-TERM Sp. z o.o.
- Miejskie Przedsiębiorstwo Wodociągów i Kanalizacji Sp. z o.o.
- Międzynarodowa Korporacja Gwarancyjna Sp. z o.o.
- Nakielskie Zakłady Maszyn i Urządzeń Gastronomicznych SPOMASZ - Nakło Sp. z o.o.
- Opolskie Zakłady Przemysłu Lniarskiego LINOPŁYT S.A.
- Piastowskie Zakłady Przemysłu Gumowego STOMIL Sp. z o.o.
- PKO BP S.A.
- POLANIA Sp. z o.o.
- Pol-Mot Holding S.A.
- Polska Agencja Inwestycji i Handlu S.A.
- Polski Fundusz Rozwoju S.A.
- Polski Monopol Loteryjny Sp. z o.o.
- Polskie Centrum Badań i Certyfikacji S.A.
- Polskie Centrum Operacji Kapitałowych Sp. z o.o.
- Polskie Linie Lotnicze LOT S.A.
- Polskie Nagrania Sp. z o.o.
- Pomorska Agencja Rozwoju Regionalnego S.A.
- Pomorska Specjalna Strefa Ekonomiczna Sp. z o.o.
- Pralnia Centralna Sp. z o.o.
- PREFBET SA
- Przedsiębiorstwo Przemysłu Bawełnianego ZAMTEX S.A.
- Przedsiębiorstwo Ceramiki Budowlanej Sp. z o.o.
- Przedsiębiorstwo Gospodarki Materiałowej Przemysłu Węglowego Sp. z o.o.
- Przedsiębiorstwo Handlowe Agroma Sp. z o.o.
- Przedsiębiorstwo Inżynierii Środowiska i Melioracji w Wągrowcu sp. z o.o.
- Przedsiębiorstwo Nasiennictwa Ogrodniczego i Szkółkarstwa w Ożarowie Mazowieckim S.A.
- Przedsiębiorstwo Obrotu Samochodami i Częściami Zamiennymi POLMOZBYT JELCZ S.A.
- Przedsiębiorstwo Obrotu Wyrobami Hutniczymi CENTROSTAL S.A.
- Przedsiębiorstwo Produkcji i Hodowli Ryb Słodkowodnych w Krakowie Sp. z o.o.
- Przedsiębiorstwo Produkcji Materiałów i Prefabrykatów Budowlanych WIPRO S.A.
- Przedsiębiorstwo Produkcyjno-Handlowe HORN Sp. z o.o.
- Przedsiębiorstwo Przemysłowo-Handlowe Nida Sp. z o.o.
- Przedsiębiorstwo Przemysłu Zbożowo-Młynarskiego PZZ S.A.
- PRZEDSIĘBIORSTWO ROBOT DROGOWYCH DROMOS Sp. z o.o.
- Przedsiębiorstwo Spedycji Międzynarodowej C. Hartwig Warszawa S.A.
- Przedsiębiorstwo Usług Hotelarskich PUH Sp. z o.o.
- Przedsiębiorstwo Zaopatrzenia Szkół CEZAS Sp. z o.o.
- Przedsiębiorstwo Zaopatrzenia Szkół Cezas Sp. z o.o.
- Przemysłowy Instytut Maszyn Budowlanych Sp. z o.o.
- Przędzalnia Czesankowa ELANEX S.A.
- Przędzalnia Zawiercie S.A.
- RAPZ Sp. z o.o.
- Regnon S.A.
- Rzeszowskie Zakłady Graficzne S.A.
- SKLEJKA ORZECHOWO S.A.
- Specjalna Strefa Ekonomiczna Starachowice S.A.
- Specjalna Strefa Ekonomiczna Małej Przedsiębiorczości S.A.
- Stilna S.A.
- Strzegomskie Zakłady Mechaniczne ZREMB S.A.
- Suwalska Specjalna Strefa Ekonomiczna S.A.
- Szczecińska Wytwórnia Wódek POLMOS S.A.
- Szczecińskie Zakłady Zbożowo-Młynarskie PZZ S.A.
- Tarchomińskie Zakłady Farmaceutyczne Polfa S.A.
- Termoizolacja Centrum Sp. z o.o.
- TEXTILIMPEX Sp. z o.o.
- Tłocznia Metali Pressta S.A.
- Tomaszowskie Kopalnie Surowców Mineralnych BIAŁA GÓRA Sp. z o.o.
- TONSIL S.A.
- Totalizator Sportowy Sp. z o.o.
- Tradecom S.A.
- UML Development Sp. z o.o.
- UMCON Sp. z o.o.
- Unimor Radiocom Sp. z o.o.
- UNITRA-UNIZET Sp. z o.o.
- Uzdrowisko Krynica - Żegiestów S.A.
- Veolia Południe Sp. z o.o.
- Vossloh Cogifer Polska Sp. z o.o.
- Wałbrzyska Specjalna Strefa Ekonomiczna INVEST PARK Sp. z o.o.
- WARMIA S. A.
- Warmińsko-Mazurska Specjalna Strefa Ekonomiczna S.A.
- Warszawskie Przedsiębiorstwo Budowlane Sp. z o.o.
- Warszawskie Zakłady Mechaniczne PZL-WZM w Warszawie S.A.
- Warszawskie Zakłady Sprzętu Ortopedycznego S.A.
- WELUX S.A
- WISKORD S.A.
- WMB w Pyskowicach S.A.
- Wytwórnia Aparatury Wtryskowej PZL-Mielec Sp. z o.o.
- Wytwórnia Silników Wysokoprężnych ANDORIA S.A.
- Wytwórnia Sprzętu Komunikacyjnego PZL Krosno S.A.
- Wytwórnia Surowic i Szczepionek BIOMED Sp. z o.o.
- Zakład Naprawczy Mechanizacji Rolnictwa Sp. z o.o.
- Zakład Produkcyjno-Handlowy Artykułów Gospodarstwa Domowego MĘSKO - AGD Sp. z o.o.
- Zakład Tworzyw Sztucznych ARTGOS S.A.
- Zakład Utrzymania Ruchu PZL-Mielec Sp. z o.o.
- Zakłady Artykułów Technicznych ARTECH Sp. z o.o.
- Zakłady Ceramiczne BOLESŁAWIEC w Bolesławcu Sp. z o.o.
- Zakłady Chemiczne RUDNIKI S.A.
- Zakłady Elektroniczne WAREL S.A.
- Zakłady Futrzarskie Kurów 1 S.A.
- Zakłady Górniczo-Hutnicze Bolesław S.A.
- Zakłady Górniczo-Hutnicze SABINÓW S.A.
- Zakłady Górniczo-Metalowe Zębiec w Zębcu S.A.
- Zakłady Maszynowe HAMECH Sp. z o.o.
- Zakłady Mechaniczne Urządzeń Górniczych DEZAM Sp. z o.o.
- Zakłady Metalurgiczne SKAWINA S.A.
- Zakłady Mięsne PEKPOL OSTROŁĘKA S.A.
- Zakłady Mięsne MACKO Sp. z o.o.
- Zakłady Mięsne w Bydgoszczy BYD-MEAT S.A.
- Zakłady Mięsne w Grodzisku Wielkopolskim Sp. z o.o.
- Zakłady Mięsne w Kępnie SA
- Zakłady Płyt Pilśniowych Czarna Woda S. A.
- Zakłady Przemysłu Lniarskiego LENWIT Sp. z o.o.
- Zakłady Przemysłu Pasmanteryjnego LENORA Sp. z o.o.
- Zakłady Przemysłu Wełnianego 9 MAJA S. A.
- Zakłady Przemysłu Wełnianego Krepol S.A.
- Zakłady Sprzętu Precyzyjnego Niewiadów S.A.
- Zakłady Tekstylno-Konfekcyjne Teofilów S.A.
- Zakłady Tkanin Wełnianych MAZOVIA S.A.
- Zakłady Tworzyw Sztucznych Pronit S.A.
- Zakłady Tytoniowe w Lublinie S.A.
- Zakłady Wyrobów Kamionkowych MARYWIL S.A.
- ZMK S.A.
- Gliwicka Agencja Turystyczna S.A.
- Narodowe Centrum Sportu - Rozliczenia Spółka z ograniczoną odpowiedzialnością
- PL.2012 + Sp. z o.o.
- Polska Agencja Rozwoju Turystyki S.A.
- Wojewódzkie Przedsiębiorstwo Usług Turystycznych Sp. z o.o.
- Polska Wytwórnia Papierów Wartościowych S.A.
- Specjalistyczne Centrum Medyczne S.A.
- Aplikacje Krytyczne Sp. z o.o.
- Siarkopol Tarnobrzeg Sp. z o.o.
- Wrocławskie Centrum Badań EIT+ Sp. z o.o.
- Exatel S.A.
- Zachodniopomorska Agencja Rozwoju Regionalnego S.A.
- BOSACKA DEVELOPMENT PARTNERS Sp. z o.o.
- Śląsko-Dąbrowska Spółka Mieszkaniowa Sp. z o.o.
- Holding KW Sp. z o.o.
- Nieruchomości KW Sp. z o.o.
- Biuro Handlowe CONCRET Sp. z o.o.
- Warmińsko-Mazurska Agencja Rozwoju Regionalnego S.A.
- Zakład Budowy Naczep Sp. z o.o.
- Laboratorium Ochrony Środowiska Pracy Sp. z o.o.
- REK-SWED Sp. z o.o.
- Kosmo Sp. z o.o.

== See also ==
- List of government-owned companies
