= Gelbwurst =

Traditional sausage from Germany

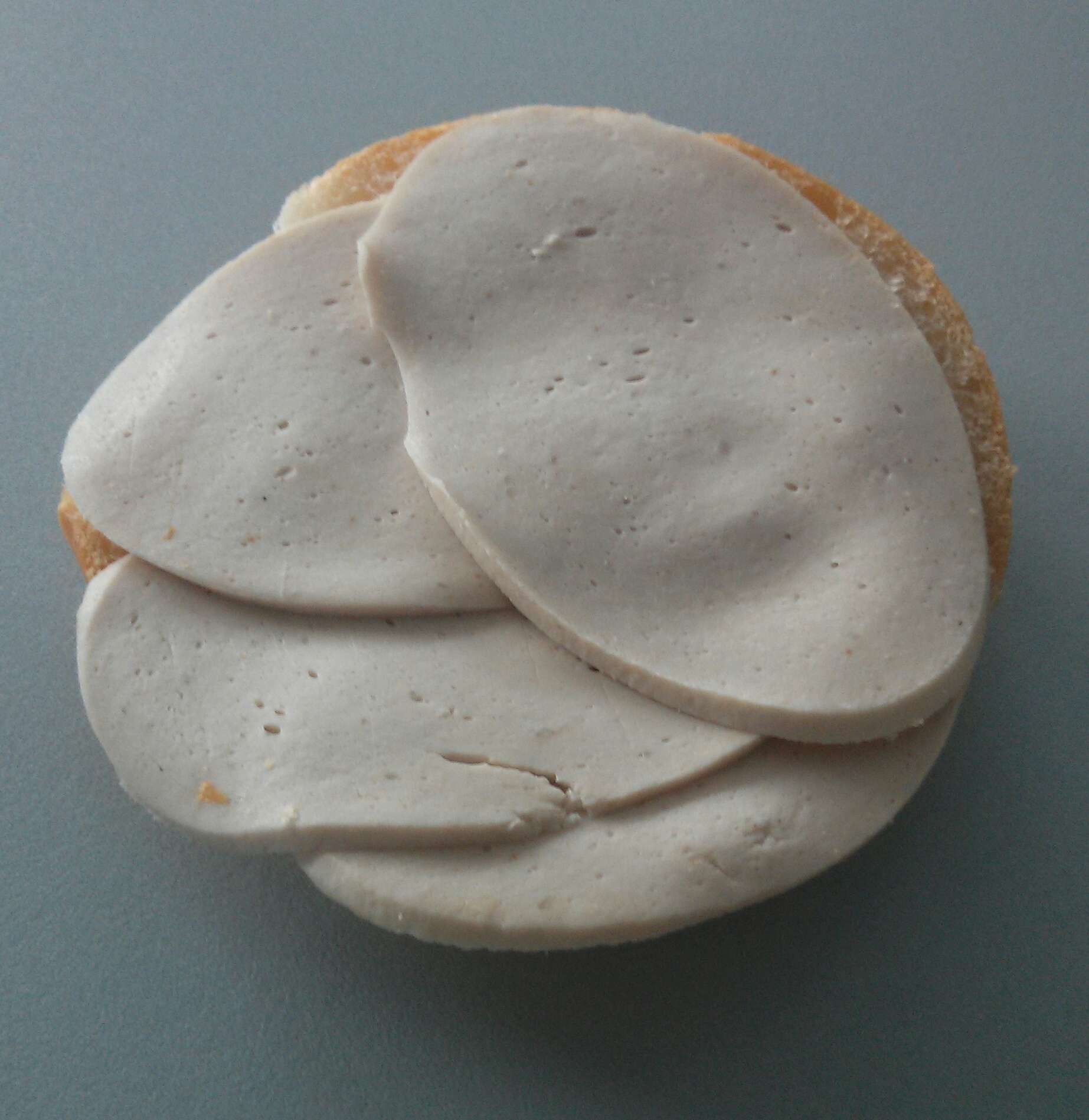
Sliced Gelbwurst on a bun

Gelbwurst, meaning “yellow sausage”, is a traditional sausage and deli meat from Bavaria, Germany.

== Description ==
Gelbwurst was invented in 1905 and is made from pork, veal, and a combination of spices such as ginger and nutmeg. Traditionally, the sausage contained brains, though this is no longer the case, it is still sometimes referred to as Hirnwurst ("brain sausage") in certain parts of Germany. Gelbwurst is yellowish-white and usually has a yellow or orange rind around its edge. It is often served as cold-cuts on slices of bread. Today the addition of brains is uncommon, the consumption of animal brains having fallen out of consumer preference. The use of bovine brains has been banned since the BSE crisis in 2000.

== Manufacturing ==
Depending on the recipe, region, and epoch, information on the preparation of the sausage varies significantly. In Germany, standardized recipes are usually used in the production of sausage types; an example is contained in the book Die Fabrikation Feiner Fleisch- und Wurstwaren. Low-tendon pork and skinless pork belly or bacon are used in production. This is slowly chopped and macerated with the addition of ice until it becomes a forcemeat. Typical spices are salt, pepper, mace, ginger, cardamom and lemon powder. The mass is usually injected into yellow artificial casings ranging in thickness from 50 to 60 mm and in weights of 1 kg. Gelbwurst should have a white cut surface after boiling. The sausage differs from other boiled sausages such as Bologna mainly by the lack of reddening usually associated with the addition of curing salts.

To produce Hanoverian Hirnwurst and Hanoverian Bregenwurst, chopped onion is added to the forcemeat. The sausage is called Weisswurst (White sausage) if natural casings with a diameter of up to 75mm are used.

Traditionally, in Bavaria, Gelbwurst is often mixed with finely chopped parsley, which gives it a green-speckled presentation.

According to the German Food Code, veal may also be used to make Gelbwurst. It also allows for the use of colored or yellow pigmented sausage casings.
