= Ławy, Ostrołęka County =

Ławy
- Village
- Location within Poland
- Coordinates: 53°4′43″N 21°38′20″E
- Country: Poland
- Voivodeship: Masovian
- County: Ostrołęka
- Gmina: Rzekuń

Ławy [ˈwavɨ] is a village in the administrative district of Gmina Rzekuń, within Ostrołęka County, Masovian Voivodeship, in east-central Poland.
