= Kraków sausage =

Cracovian sausage from Poland

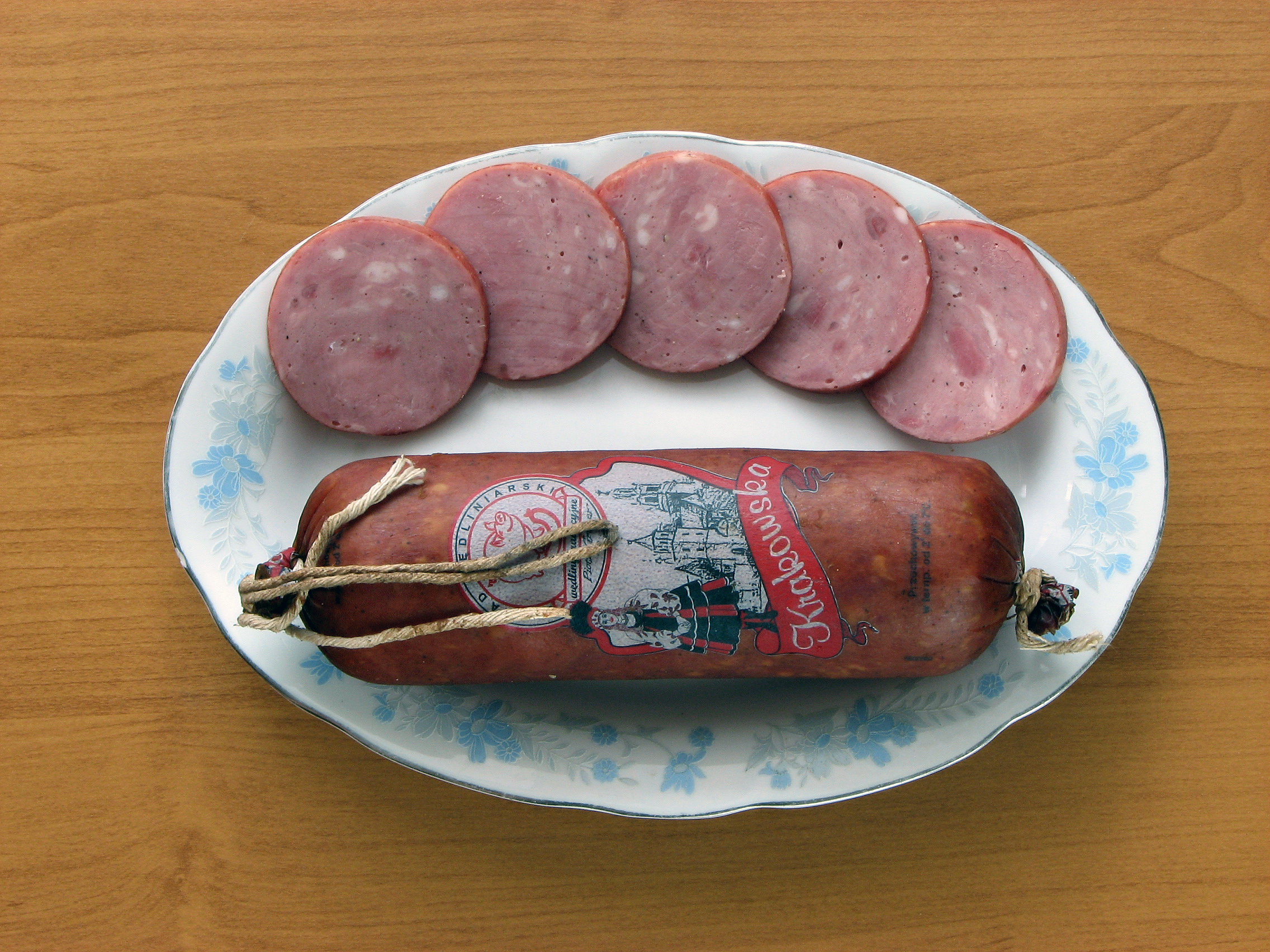
- Type: Sausage
- Course: Appetizer
- Place of origin: Poland
- Serving temperature: Hot, cold
- Main ingredients: Pork

The Kraków sausage (Polish: kiełbasa krakowska), also known by its German name, Krakauer, is a type of Polish sausage (kielbasa), usually served as a cold cut. The name is the adjective form of the name of the city of Kraków (medieval capital of the Polish–Lithuanian Commonwealth until the late 16th century). It is made from cuts of lean pork seasoned with pepper, allspice, coriander and garlic, packed into large casings and smoked.

It is registered under the name Kiełbasa krakowska sucha staropolska ("old-Polish dry sausage of Kraków") as a Traditional Speciality Guaranteed product in the European Union and the United Kingdom.

== Gallery ==
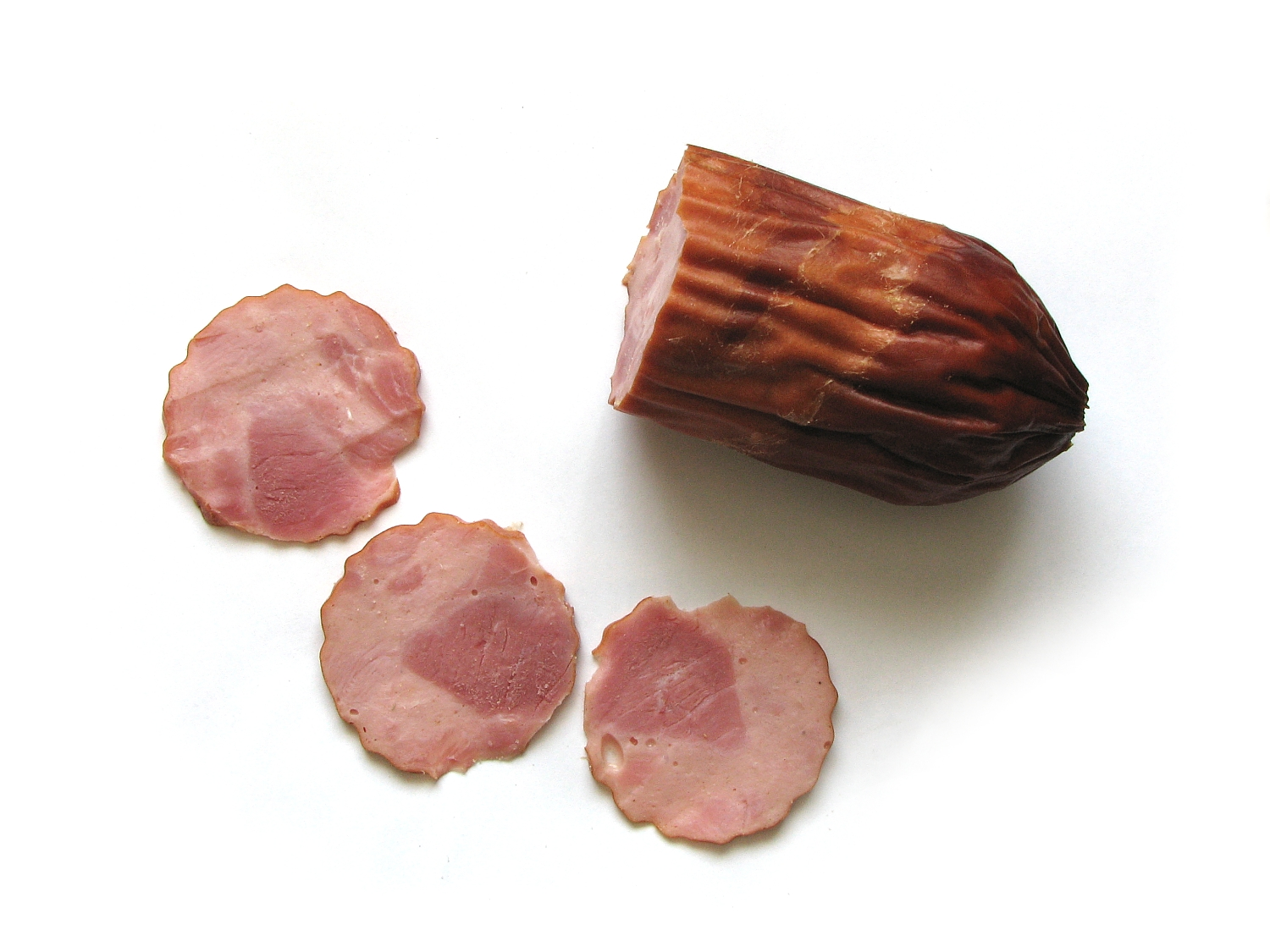
Krakowska

== See also ==
- List of smoked foods
- Rookworst
