= Pimiento =

Cultivar of Capsicum annuum

- Pimiento peppers
- Species: Capsicum annuum
- Cultivar: Pimiento
- Heat: Mild
- Scoville scale: 100–500 SHU

The pimiento, or pimento, is a variety of red, heart-shaped chili pepper (Capsicum annuum) that measures 7–10 centimetres (3–4 inches) long and 2–3 centimetres (3/4–1 1/4 inches) wide.

== Description and habitat ==
Pimientos grow in hardiness zones 4 through 12.

Like most peppers, immature pimento pods are green and develop other colors, including yellow, green, red, and maroon, as they reach maturity.

The flesh of the pimiento is sweet, succulent, and more aromatic than that of the red bell pepper. Some varieties of the pimiento type are hot, including the Floral Gem and Santa Fe Grande varieties.

== Name ==
Spanish pimiento and Portuguese pimento both come from Latin pigmentum ("pigment; coloring"). Before that, long pepper was called pippali in Sanskrit, which became péperi in Ancient Greek and piper in Latin. Through popular phonological and morphological evolution during the Middle Ages people renamed black pepper pimienta in Spanish, and with the Columbian Exchange this name was first coined to allspice and pungent chilli peppers, later coming to be used for bell peppers as well. The English borrowed "pimiento" and "pimento" as loanwords for what is distinguished in Spanish as pimentón and in Portuguese as pimentão.

In Jamaican English pimento usually refers to allspice (Pimenta dioica), while chilli peppers are usually called pepper or hot pepper.

== Uses ==
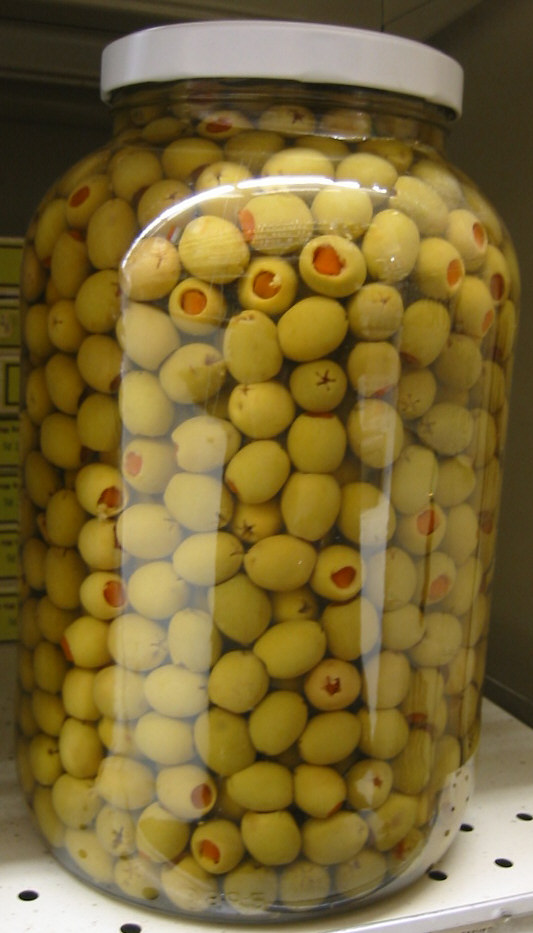
Green Spanish olives stuffed with red pimiento peppers

Pimiento peppers are the familiar red stuffing found in prepared Spanish or Greek green olives. Originally, the pimiento was hand-cut into tiny pieces, then hand-stuffed into each olive to balance out the olive's otherwise strong, salty flavor. Despite the popularity of the combination, this production method was very costly and time-intensive.

Today, for ease of production, pimientos are often puréed, then formed into tiny strips with the help of a natural gum (such as sodium alginate or guar gum). This allows olive stuffing to be mechanized, speeding the process and lowering production costs.

Pimientos are commonly used for making pimento cheese. They are also used for making pimento loaf, a type of processed sandwich meat.

== See also ==
- List of Capsicum cultivars
