= Kielbasa =

Smoked Polish sausage

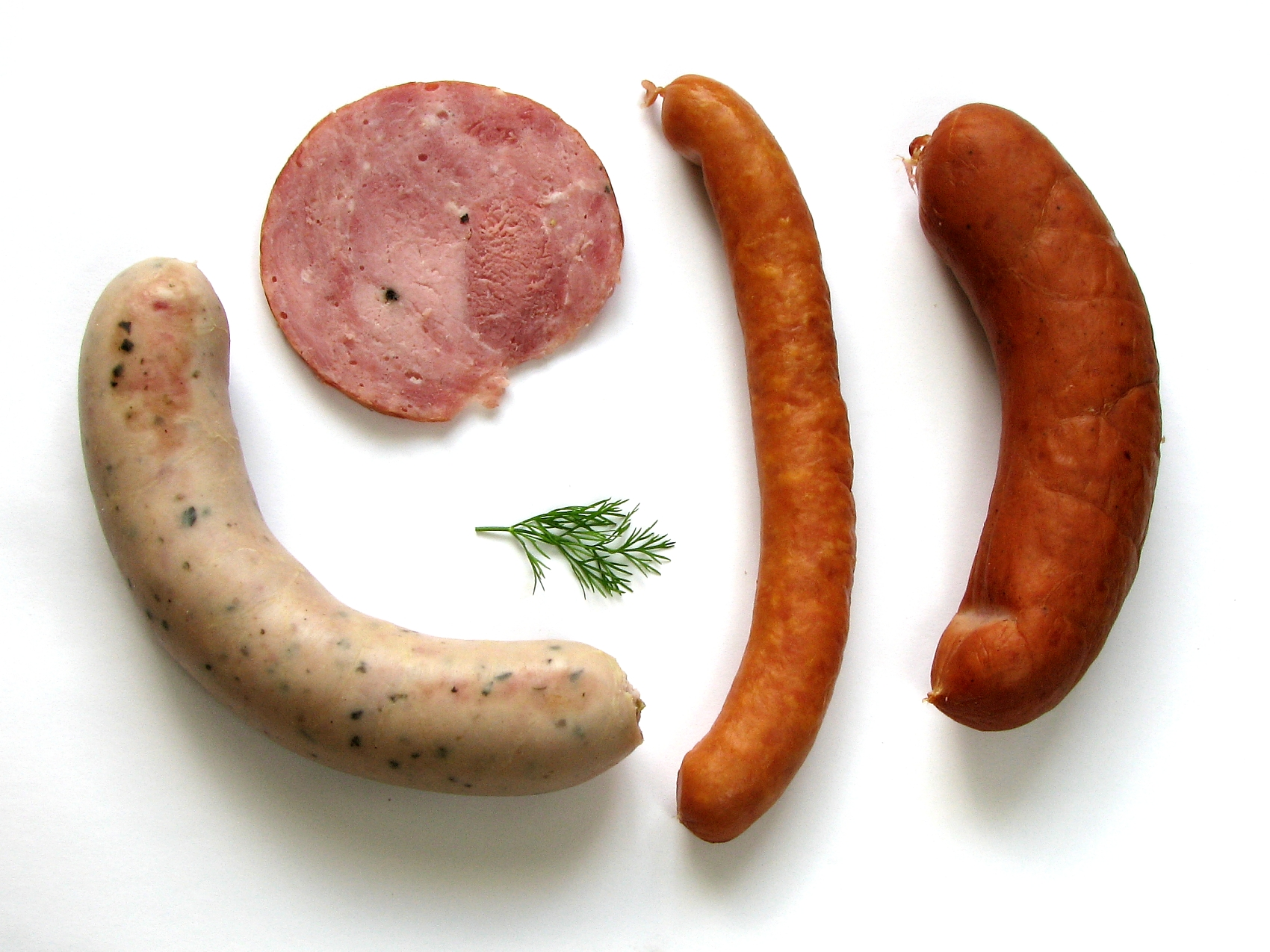
- Four types of kiełbasa made in Poland: biała kiełbasa (white sausage), a slice of kiełbasa krakowska, the thin kabanos (pl. 'kabanos'), and kiełbasa wiejska (farmhouse sausage)
- Type: Sausage
- Course: Main
- Place of origin: Poland
- Region or state: Central Europe and Eastern Europe
- Main ingredients: Meat (pork, beef, turkey, lamb, chicken or veal)

Kielbasa (UK: /kiːlˈbæsə/, US: /kiːlˈbɑːsə, kɪ(l)ˈbɑːsə/; from Polish kiełbasa [kʲɛwˈbasa]) (Note: Other common names include kołbasa, klobasa, kobasa, kolbasi and kovbasa. In English, these words contain a particular type of sausage. In the Slavic languages, these are the generic words for all types of sausage, local or foreign.) is any type of meat sausage from Poland and a staple of Polish cuisine. In American English, it is typically a coarse, U-shaped smoked sausage of any kind of meat, which closely resembles the Wiejska sausage (typically pork only).

== Etymology and usage ==
The word entered English directly from the Polish kiełbasa meaning "sausage", derived from the Proto-Slavic *kъlbasa. Its exact origin is unclear, perhaps borrowed from either Turkic külbastı or via Jewish butchers, from Hebrew kolbasar.

The terms entered English simultaneously from different sources, which accounts for the different spellings. Usage varies between cultural groups and countries, but overall there is a distinction between American and Canadian usage. In New Jersey, Pennsylvania and most areas of Greater New York City, a plural Polish transitional form is sometimes seen, kiełbasy (/kɪˈbɑːsi/). Canadians also use the word kolbassa or kubasa (/kuːbɑːˈsɑː/ or /ˈkuːbəsɑː/), an Anglicization of the Ukrainian kobasa (кобаса), and Albertans even abbreviate it as kubie to refer to the sausage eaten on a hot dog bun. (Note: The Canadian Oxford Dictionary has headwords for the Canadian usage kubasa, as well as the Albertan kubie and kubie burger, for kielbasa dogs and burgers, respectively. These have been made popular by Stawnichy's Meat Processing of Mundare, who have made Ukrainian-style sausage and have a variety of 'Kubie'- derived patties and cutlets. See also this article. Archived July 6, 2011, at the Wayback Machine.)

== Varieties and regional variations ==
=== Poland ===
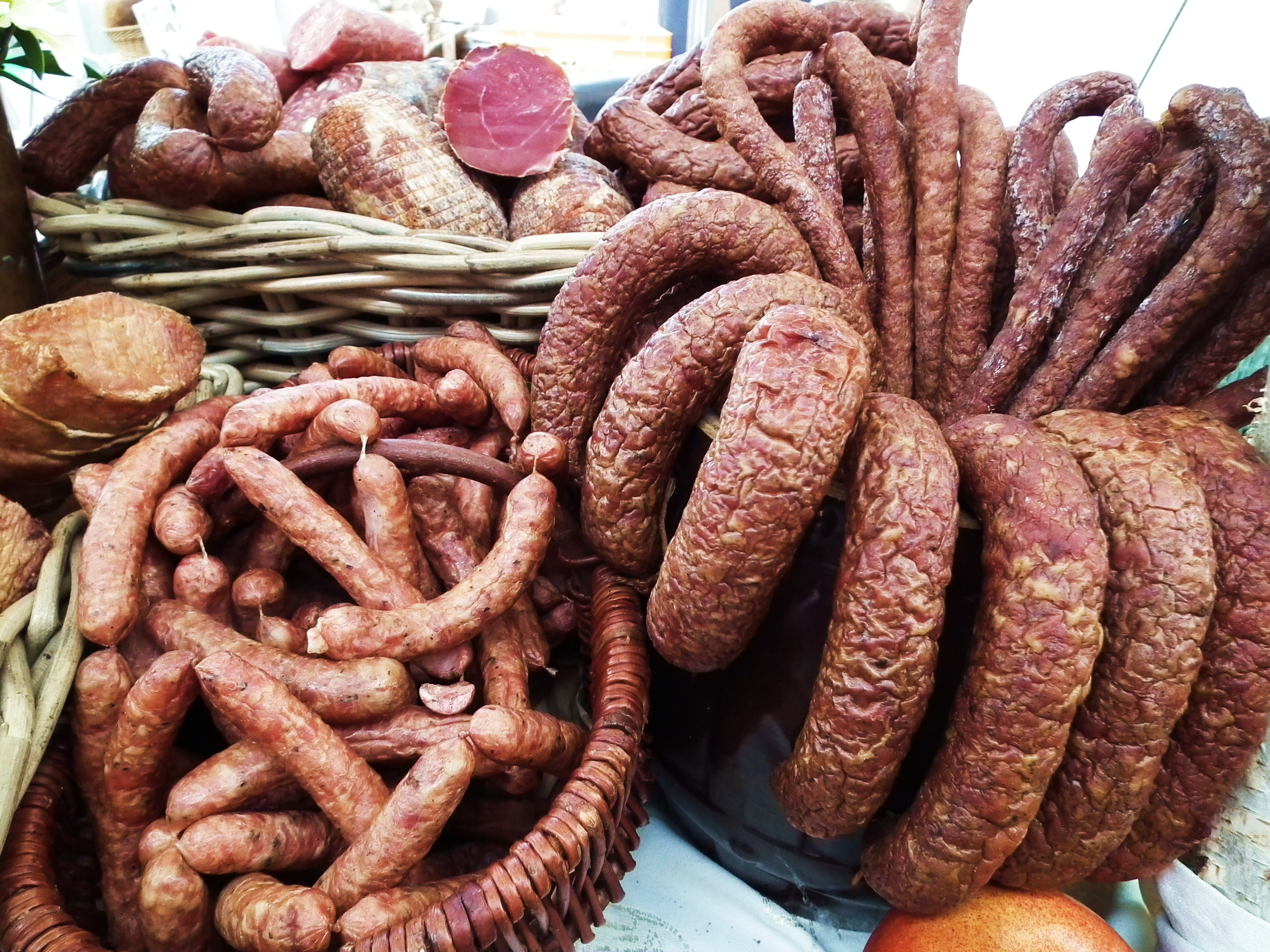
A variety of dried sausage in Poznań, Poland

Sausage is a staple of Polish cuisine and comes in dozens of varieties, smoked or fresh, made with pork, beef, turkey, lamb, chicken or veal with every region having its own speciality. Of these, the kiełbasa lisiecka, produced in Małopolskie, kiełbasa biała parzona wielkopolska and kiełbasa piaszczańska are Protected Geographical Indications in the EU and the UK. Furthermore, kabanosy staropolskie, kiełbasa jałowcowa staropolska, kiełbasa krakowska sucha staropolska, and kiełbasa myśliwska staropolska are Traditional Specialities Guaranteed in the UK and EU as well.

There are official Polish government guides and classifications of sausages based on size, meat, ready-to-eat or uncooked varieties.

Originally made at home in rural areas, there are a wide variety of recipes for kielbasa preparation at home and for holidays. Kielbasa is also one of the most traditional foods served at Polish weddings.

==== Types ====
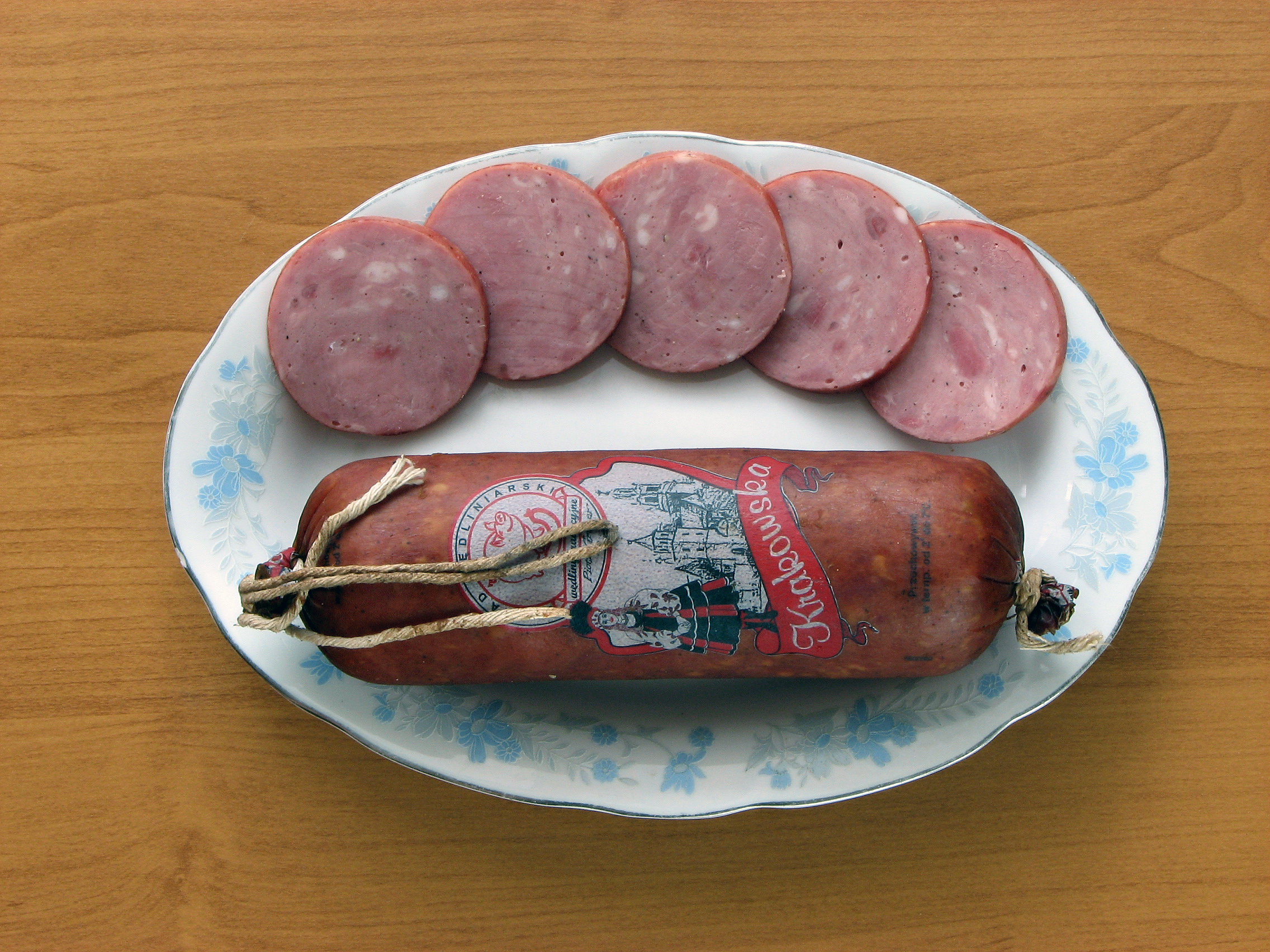
Kiełbasa krakowska, also called "Krakauer", which originated in the city of Kraków

Types of Polish sausage include:

- kabanos, a thin, air-dried sausage flavoured with caraway seed, originally made of pork, sometimes a horse meat variation may be found.
- kiełbasa odesska, made with beef.
- kiełbasa wędzona, Polish smoked sausage, used often in soups.
- krakowska, a thick, straight sausage hot-smoked with pepper and garlic; its name comes from Kraków
- wiejska ([ˈvʲejska]), farmhouse or countryside sausage, often in a large U. Pork and veal sausage with marjoram and garlic, sometimes also containing small amounts of coriander; its name means "rural" or (an adjectival use of) "country", or (adjectival use of) "village".
- weselna, "wedding" sausage, medium thick, u-shaped smoked sausage; often eaten during parties, but not exclusively.
- kaszanka, kiszka or krupniok is a traditional blood sausage or black pudding. An Upper Silesian version using breadcrumbs instead of groat is called żymlok from "żymła" – bread roll.
- myśliwska is a smoked, dried pork sausage, similar to kabanos but much thicker.
- kiełbasa biała, a white sausage sold uncooked and often used in soups such as barszcz biały, probably of Bavarian or Thuringian origin.

The most popular kiełbasa is also called "kiełbasa polska" ("Polish sausage") or "kiełbasa starowiejska" ("old countryside sausage").

In Poland, kiełbasa is often served garnished with fried onions. Smoked kiełbasa can be served cold, hot, boiled, baked or grilled. It is used in soups such as żurek (sour rye soup), kapuśniak (cabbage soup), or grochówka (pea soup), baked or cooked with sauerkraut, or added to bean dishes and stews (notably bigos, a Polish national dish). Kiełbasa is also very popular served as a cold cut on a platter, usually for an appetizer at traditional Polish parties. It is also a common snack (zagrycha) served with beer or plain vodka.

=== Ukraine ===
In Ukraine, kielbasa is called "kovbasa". It is a general term that refers to a variety of sausages, including "domashnia" (homemade kovbasa), "pechinkova" (liver kovbasa), and "budzhena" (smoked kovbasa).

It is served in a variety of ways, such as fried with onions atop varenyky, sliced on rye bread, or eaten with an egg. In Ukraine kovbasa may be roasted in an oven on both sides and stored in ceramic pots with lard. The sausage is often made at home; however, it has become increasingly common at markets and even supermarkets. Kovbasa also tends to accompany pysanky and krashanky (dyed and decorated eggs) as well as the Orthodox Easter bread, paska, in baskets which is blessed by the Ukrainian Orthodox priests with holy water before being consumed.

The most generic forms of Ukrainian kovbasa include garlic. Those in the Ukrainian SSR of the late Soviet Union who prioritised welfare and economic issues over the 'national question' (independence) were often referred to as having a 'kovbasa mentality'.

=== Canada ===
In Canada, varieties typical of Poland, Hungary, Slovakia, Czech Republic, western Ukraine, and elsewhere are available in supermarkets, and more specific varieties can be found in specialty shops. The world's largest display model of a Ukrainian sausage is a roadside attraction in Mundare, Alberta, the home of Stawnichy's Meat Processing.

=== Hungary ===
Kolbász is the Hungarian word for sausage. Hungarian cuisine produces a vast number of types of sausages. The most common smoked Hungarian sausages are Gyulai Kolbász, Csabai Kolbász, Csemege Kolbász, Házi Kolbász, Cserkész Kolbász, lightly smoked, like Debreceni Kolbász (or Debreciner) and Lecsókolbász, a spicy sausage made specifically for serving as part of the dish Lecsó, a vegetable stew with peppers and tomatoes. Hungarian boiled sausage types are called "hurka": either liver sausage, "májas", or blood sausage, "véres". The main ingredient is liver and rice, or meat and rice. Salt, pepper, and spices are optionally added. Butter is not.

=== Slovenia ===
The kranjska klobasa "Carniolan sausage" closely resembling the Polish kiełbasa wiejska is the best known Slovenian sausage.

=== United States ===
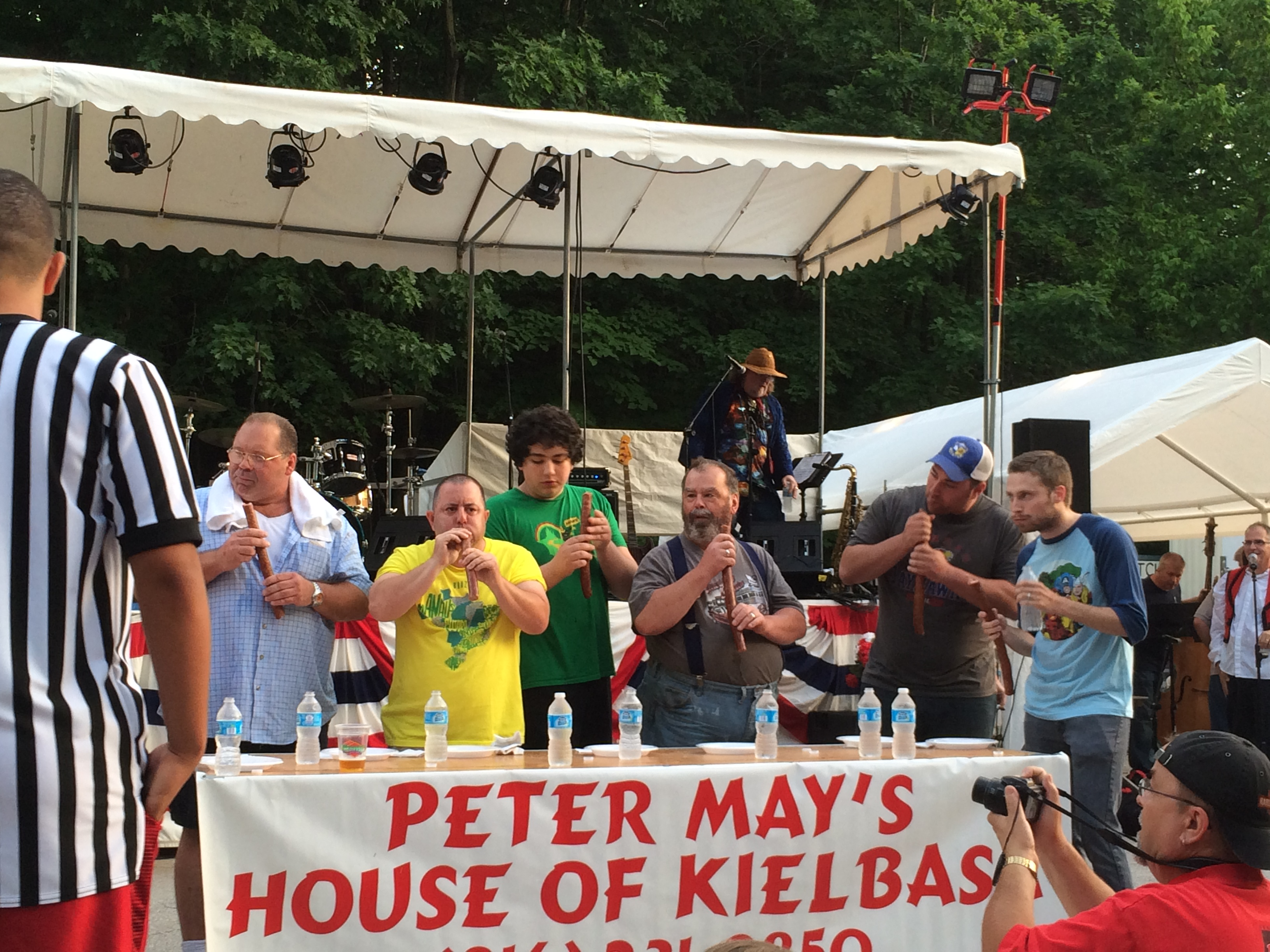
Kielbasa eating contest held in Kansas City

In the United States, kielbasa, which may also be referred to as Polish sausage in some areas, is widely available in grocery stores and speciality import markets. While the smoked variety is more commonly found, the uncured variety is often available, particularly in areas with large Polish populations. Several sandwiches featuring the sausage as a main ingredient have become iconic in local cuisines including Chicago's Maxwell Street Polish, Cleveland's Polish Boy, and several offerings from Primanti Brothers in Pittsburgh.

=== Elsewhere ===
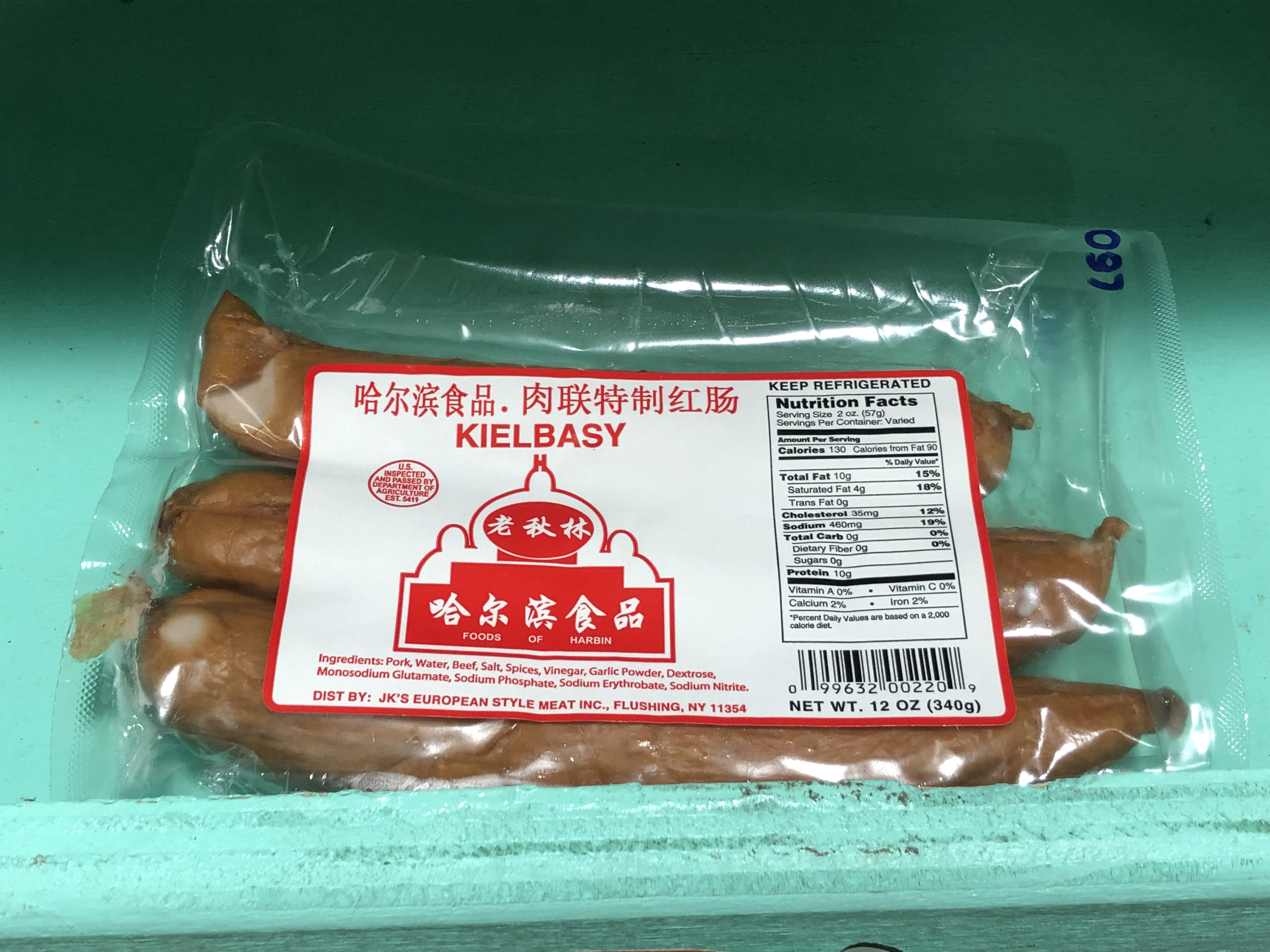
Kielbasy made in Harbin, modern China

In Russia, it is known as kolbasa (колбаса pronounced [kəɫbɐˈsa]), mentioned as early as the 12th century in Birch bark manuscript number 842. In the Russian language the word kolbasa refers to all sausage-like meat products including salami and bologna. Similar sausages are found in other countries as well, notably the Czech Republic (spelled "klobása", or regionally "klobás"), Slovakia (spelled "klobása"), and Slovenia (spelled "klobása"). In Croatia, as well as in Bosnia and Herzegovina, Montenegro, and Serbia, this sausage is called "kobasica" or "kobasa", while in Bulgaria and North Macedonia it is called "kolbas". In Austria, it is called "Klobassa" (similar to the neighbouring Slavic-speaking countries). In South Africa, this type of sausage is known as the "Russian" sausage, and is often deep-fried and served with chips as fast food.

In China, where once prominent White émigré residents fleeing from the Russian Civil War were concentrated, the food was gradually localized around major hubs. Even though Harbin Russian residents are scarce today, Kielbasa remains in production that inherited to local residents until today in Harbin.

A dried sausage that is eaten as a snack in Japan is called カルパス (karupasu) and arrived with Russian immigrants fleeing similar to China.

== See also ==
- Charcuterie
- Salumi
- Sucuk
