= Myśliwska =

Type of Polish sausage

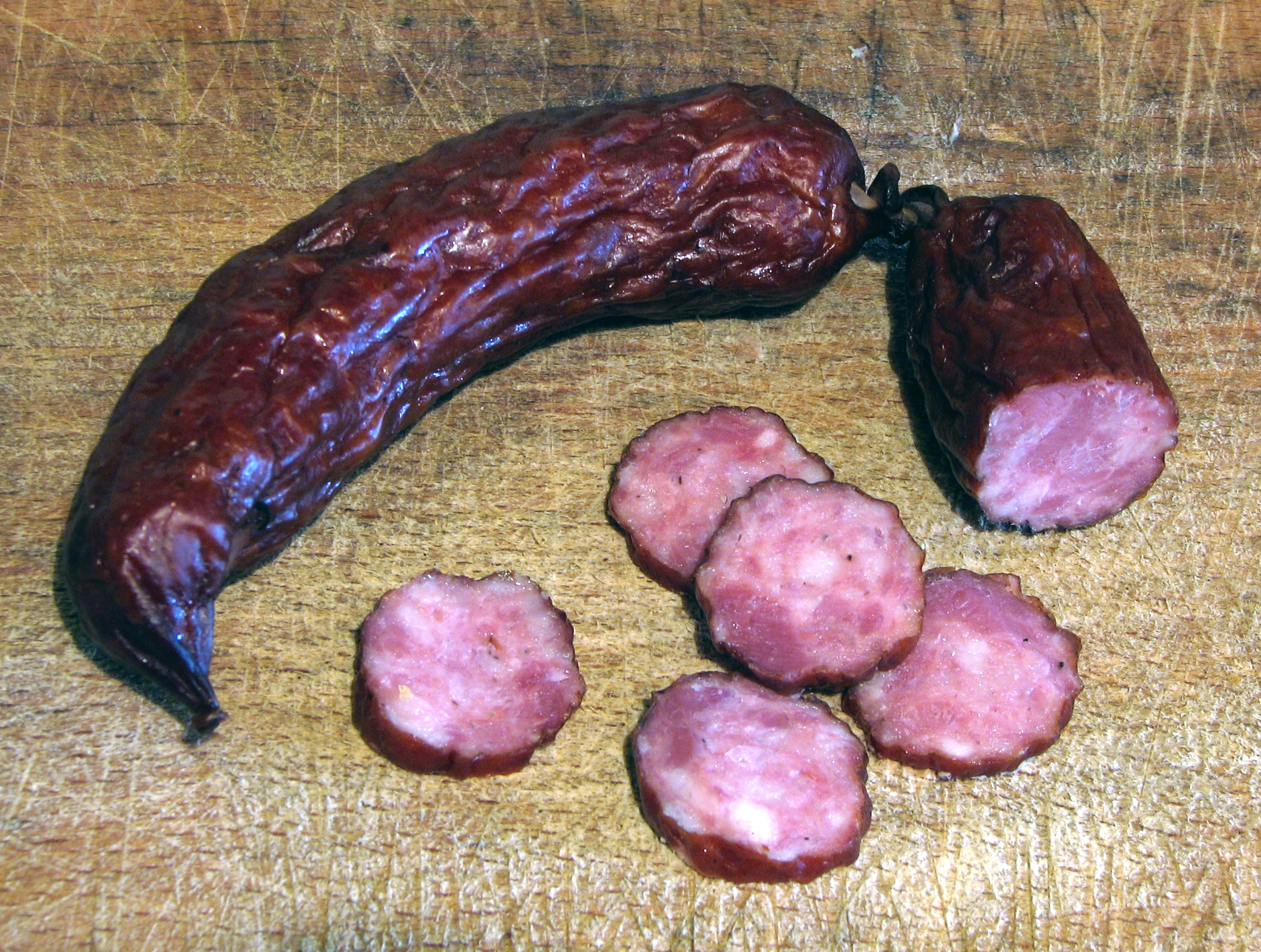
- Type: Sausage
- Course: Appetizer, main
- Place of origin: Poland
- Serving temperature: Hot, cold
- Main ingredients: Pork

Kiełbasa myśliwska ('hunter's sausage') is a type of kielbasa (Polish sausage). Lightly smoked and dried, its ingredients are pork, salt, pepper, and juniper. It is typically around 10 centimetres (4 inches) long and 2.5 cm (1 in) in diameter. At least one brand, made in Poland but sold in the UK, contains beef as well as pork.

As implied by the name this is a favourite of hunters, fishermen, and other outdoor workers. It is registered under the name "kiełbasa myśliwska staropolska" as a traditional meat product in Poland and a Traditional Speciality Guaranteed product in the European Union and the United Kingdom.

== Gallery ==
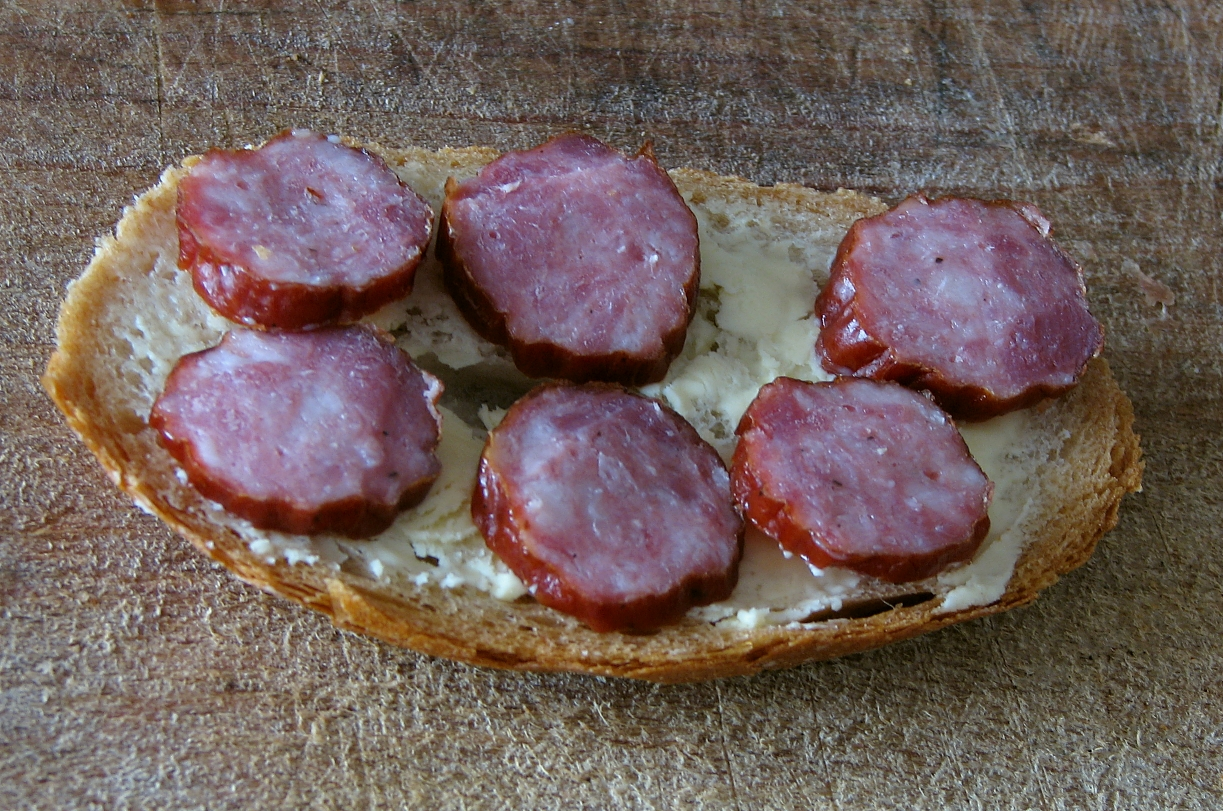
Kiełbasa myśliwska

== See also ==
- Kielbasa
- List of sausages
- Polish cuisine
