= Cold plate =

Dish usually prepared in advance, served at large gatherings

A cold plate is a popular dish with origins in rural Newfoundland, Canada.

It is generally served as a mid-day or evening meal. In Newfoundland, cold plates are typically served at weddings and large gatherings. The ability to prepare this dish almost entirely in advance makes it amenable to such purposes.

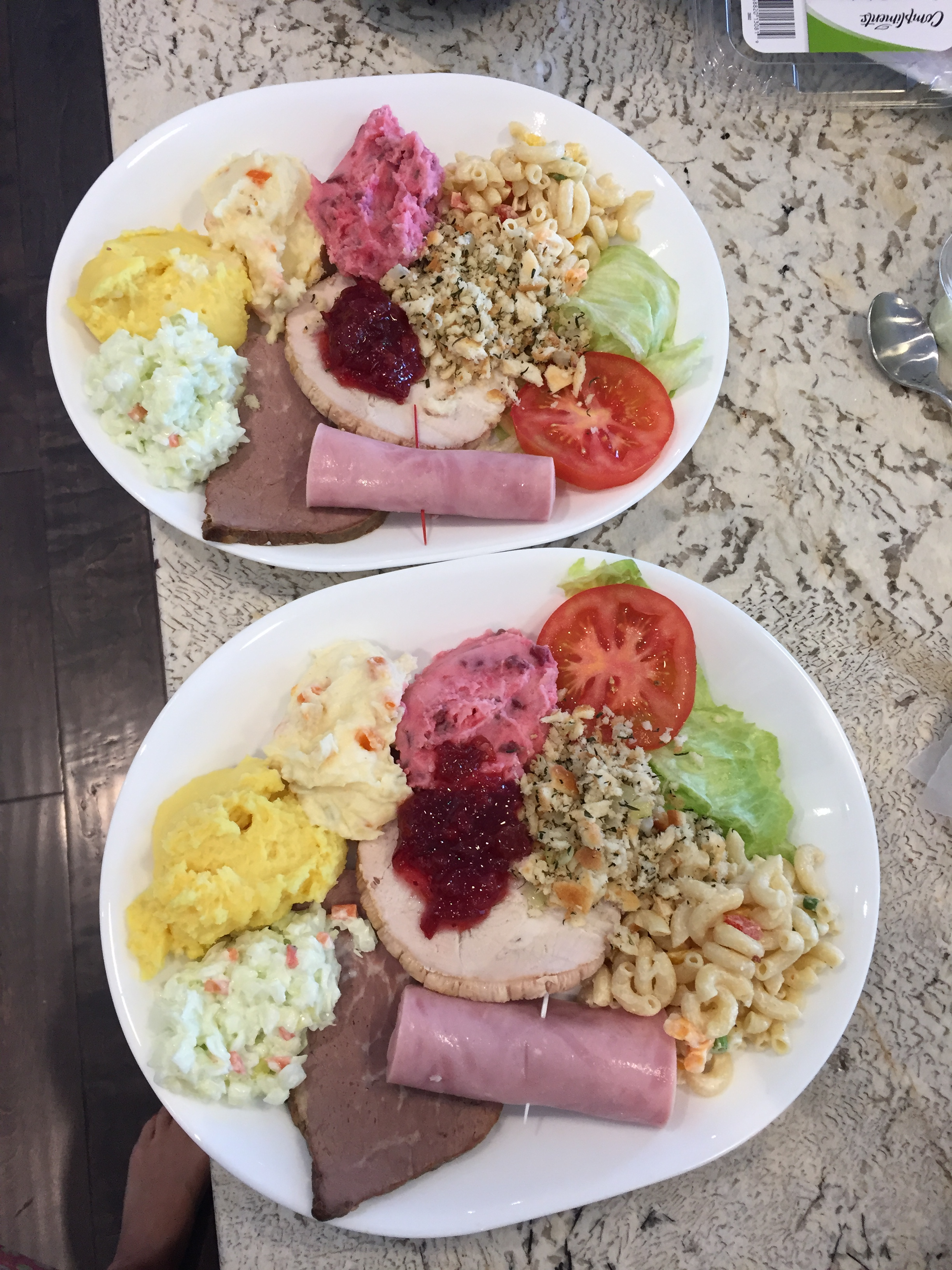
Two cold plates

Cold plates are also commonly prepared and sold at community fundraisers in rural Newfoundland.

Components of a cold plate include:

- A serving each of turkey breast, ham, and roast beef.
- Pasta salad
- Various mashed potato based salads:
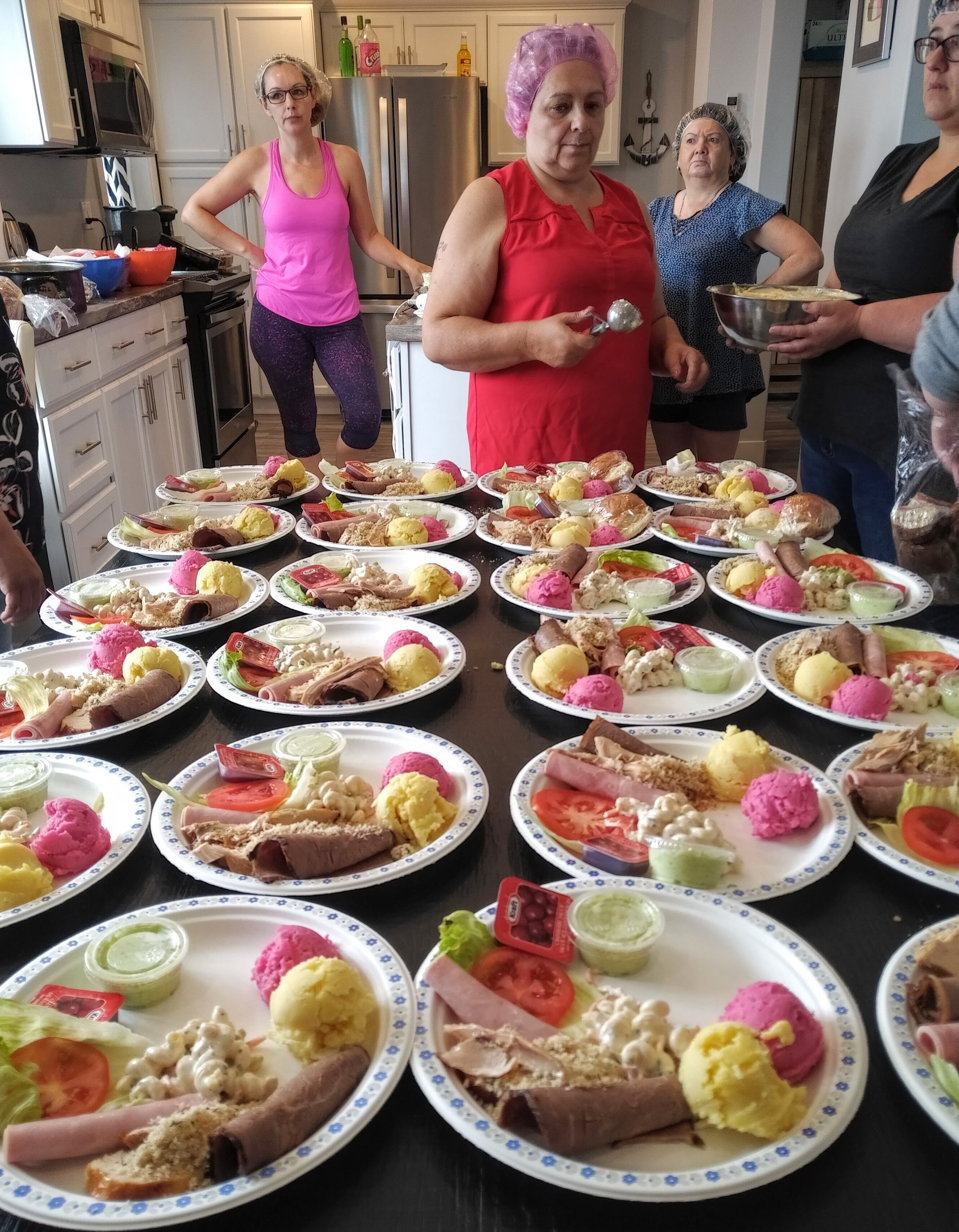
  - Bulk preparation of cold plates in rural Newfoundland, Canada, prior to a large community event
    Beet salad
  - Mustard salad
  - Vegetable salad
- Lettuce
- Tomato
- Dressing (traditional Newfoundland turkey stuffing prepared with Newfoundland Savory)
- Cranberry (optional)
- Fresh baked dinner roll (usually white bread)
- A serving of jelly salad (also referred to as a Jello salad)
- Coleslaw
