= Kabanos =

Thin dry Polish sausage

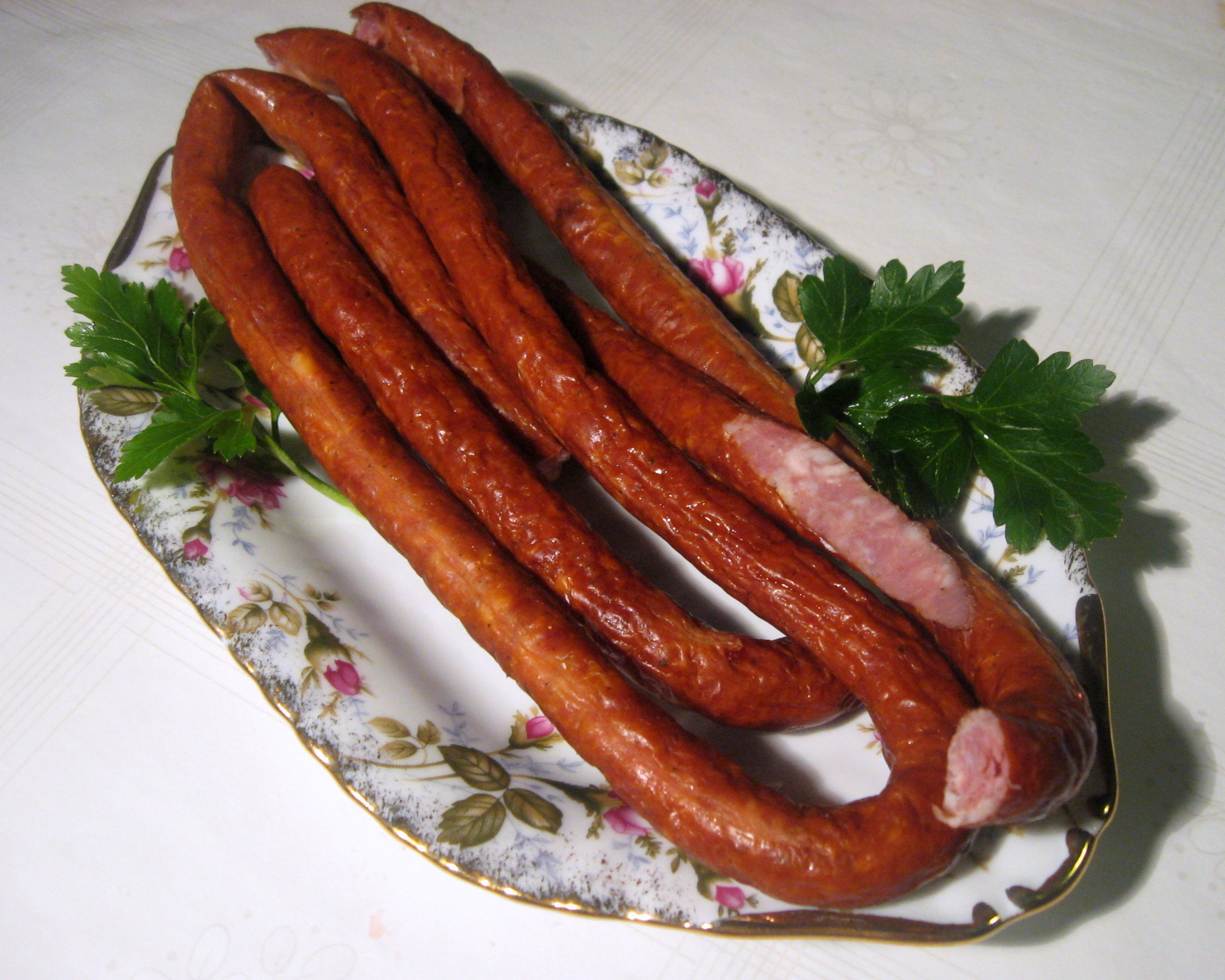
- Polish kabanos
- Alternative names: Cabanossi, kabana, cabano
- Type: Sausage
- Course: Appetizer, main
- Place of origin: Poland
- Serving temperature: Hot, cold
- Main ingredients: Pork

Kabanos (/kəˈbænəs/; Polish: [kaˈbanɔs], plural: kabanosy), also known as cabanossi or kabana, is a long, thin, dry sausage usually made of pork which originated in Poland. They are smoky in flavor, and can be soft or very dry in texture depending on freshness. Typically, they are quite long, 60 cm (24 in), but very thin, with a diameter around 1 cm (1/2 in), and folded in two, giving them a characteristic appearance. Versions made of chicken and turkey are staples in kosher meat markets and delicatessens.

== Etymology and history ==
The name comes from the word kaban, an old obsolete term used in eastern parts of Poland for a young male pig fattened with potatoes specially for making this kind of sausage (hence kabanos, 'made of kaban'). The word kaban with a similar meaning is also present in other neighbouring languages; it was initially loaned from Turkic languages where it denotes a boar (compare Tatar: kaban, Azerbaijani: qaban, Kazakh: қабан, cognate with Turkish: yaban).

Kabanosy (also known as cabanossi in Australia and New Zealand) are known to have been produced since medieval times at least, and because of their long-lasting capabilities they were considered perfect food for soldiers and travellers, which is reflected by kabanos' design traits: thinness, usually very extended length, and shape in which they are always kept. According to some historians, they were hung around the neck like a necklace, allowing horsemen to eat on the go without stopping for a food break. For the same reason, they were also used as hiking food and are very common among Gorals. Tighter, smaller wraps of long kabanosy — as sold nowadays — were also common among foot soldiers (and travellers). Smaller kabanos wrapping allowed it to be "worn" on a wrist and eaten while marching.

Nowadays, kabanosy are made using different spices, and come in many different flavours. Before the 20th century, various spices were also being used in the production of kabanosy, giving them locally distinct tastes, which differed between various regions of Poland.

== Modern times ==
Production of kabanosy requires a minimum of 150 grams (5.3 oz) of best grade pork meat to make 100 grams (3.5 oz) of sausage, which is known today as the "minimum of 3:2 ratio". This is required because of the loss of some of the water contained within the meat used to prepare the raw sausage, which evaporates during the long process of meat smoking. Nowadays almost every Polish manufacturer of kabanosy describes on the packaging at which ratio their sausage was made; for example, the manufacturer Kania states that "157 grams of meat was used to make 100 grams of kabanosy".

The two main types of kabanosy include a slightly "softer" and more common type (smoked much less, just for the taste), and a "harder" type (much drier than the softer ones), which are smoked for a very long time, basically until bending the sausage becomes difficult (to the point that it cracks when someone attempts to bend it). Because of the long and thorough smoking process, the "harder" kabanos type is extremely long-lasting and does not spoil as quickly as most other meats without preservatives.

Furthermore, kabanosy are also categorized into two other main types, depending on the amount of spices used: "hot" (very spicy) and "mild" (less spicy). Both "harder" and "softer" types of kabanosy come in "hot" or "mild", since the "hardness" of the sausage comes only from the length of its smoking time, but otherwise the two are made of the same ingredients.

According to modern recipes, kabanosy are seasoned with different spices, such as black pepper, chili, and others. Unlike other meats, these sausages are typically eaten alone as an appetiser or are often served with cheese. Although kabanosy can be cooked with other food, they are usually served cold only. Only if no other meat were available to Polish travelers or soldiers would they then have sliced kabanos into small pieces to cook them with vegetables, buckwheat, millet, potatoes, or whatever else was available.

Some manufacturers have created sausages made with the same process as kabanosy, but have substituted the traditional pork with other meat (mainly poultry). Due to their distinct shape and look, they are often called kabanosy, too, with the addition of the name of the meat they contain, such as kabanosy z kurczaka, 'chicken kabanosy'.

== Serving ==
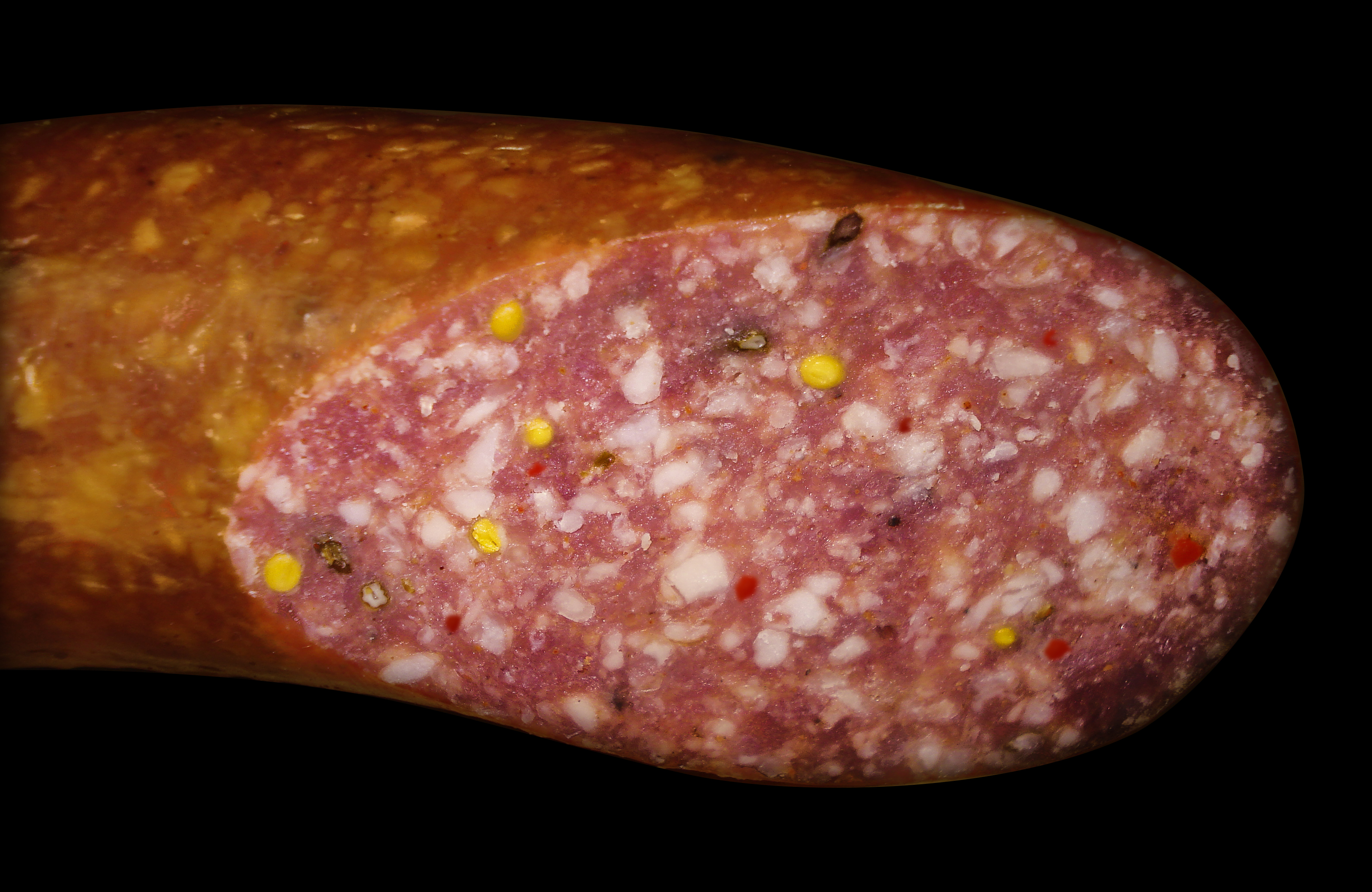
German Cabanossi

It is commonly cut into bite-sized chunks and eaten cold as an appetiser or snack, often with cheese and crackers. Small kabanosy, called mini-kabanosy, are also available. Sliced kabanosy are also a popular pizza topping.

== Distribution ==
The kabanos sausage is mostly found in Southern, Central and Eastern European countries from the Adriatic Sea to the Baltic states, and is also very popular in Australia, New Zealand, South Africa, Israel, and Peru, where the sausage is one of the most prevalent dried sausages. In Central and Eastern Europe, kabanos is mostly consumed as a snack. In Israel, because of dietary laws (Jewish kashrut and Muslim halal), kabanos sausage is almost exclusively made of chicken or turkey. Kabanos is also fairly popular in Colombia, where it is called cábano.

== Traditional Speciality Guaranteed: Kabanosy staropolskie ==
After the accession of Poland to the European Union, Poland and Germany became involved in a trade dispute over the name kabanos (due to a German claim to the traditional Polish recipe). In 2011, when Polish manufacturers submitted scientific proofs of kabanos's Polish origins, the EU registered Kabanosy staropolskie as a Traditional Speciality Guaranteed on request of Poland. This status does not forbid manufacturers from other countries to produce and sell kabanos under that name, but demands that when using the name Kabanosy staropolskie, it is made according to specified "time-honoured recipes".

== See also ==
- List of sausages
- List of dried foods
- List of smoked foods
