= Tiger Brands =

South African FMCG company

- Type: Public
- Traded as: JSE: TBS
- ISIN: ZAE000071080
- Industry: FMCG; Manufacturing
- Predecessor: Tiger Oats
- Founded: 1921; 105 years ago
- Headquarters: Midrand, Gauteng, South Africa
- Number of locations: 34 manufacturing plants
- Area served: Africa
- Key people: Geraldine Fraser-Moleketi (Chairperson); Tjaart Kruger (CEO)
- Products: Food; Beverages; Home consumables Personal care items
- Revenue: ▲ R34.4 billion (2025)
- Operating income: ▲ R3.8 billion (2025)
- Total assets: ▲ R26.95 billion (2025)
- Total equity: ▲ R16.89 billion (2025)
- Number of employees: 8,295 (2025)
- Website: tigerbrands.com

Tiger Brands is a major South African FMCG company, based in Midrand, Gauteng. Founded in 1921, Tiger Brands manufactures products across a variety of categories for local and export markets.

== History ==
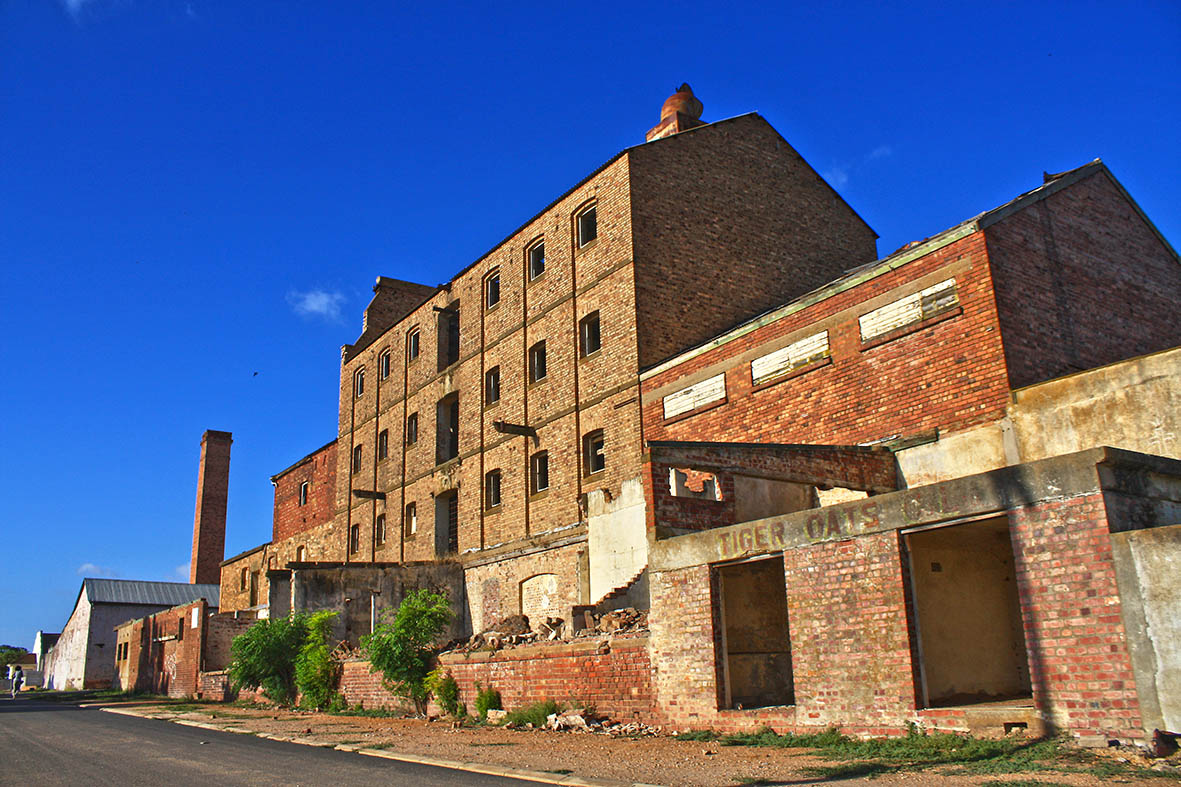
The Old Tiger Oats buildings in Moorreesburg, Western Cape

Jacob Frankel with help from Joffe Marks founded Tiger Oats Limited in 1921. Tiger Brands Limited was formerly known as Tiger Oats Limited and began as a family business.

Originally known as Tiger Oats, Tiger Brand's first product was a breakfast oatmeal brand called Jungle Oats. Jungle Oats are still produced by the brand. It was first conceived by Frankel towards the end of the 19th century and was finally launched in 1925. Tiger Oat's first mill was opened in Moorreesburg, Western Cape. A second mill was opened in Maitland, Cape Town when demand outgrew the Moorreesburg mill's capacity in 1930. The Moorreesburg mill was abandoned in about 1987.

The company listed on the Johannesburg Stock Exchange (JSE) in 1944.

In March 1982, Barlow bought a majority share in Tiger Oats through CG Smith Limited. CG Smith was unbundled from Barlow Rand in 1993.

In 1988, SPAR South Africa became a wholly owned subsidiary of Tiger Oats, however it was unbundled and listed as a separate company in 2004. During the late 1990s, Tiger Oats went through a period of rapid expansion. It bought out other large companies and competitors such as Imperial Cold Storage and Supply Company, a food packaging company (in October 1998) and pharmaceutical company Adcock Ingram for R3.4bn in 1999.

After the buyouts, Tiger Oats was renamed Tiger Brands. In July 2008, Adcock Ingram was unbundled from Tiger Brands.

Tiger Brands Limited's subcompany, Tiger Food Brands Ltd merged with Bromor Foods (Pty) Ltd, which owns the Super Juice carbonated drink. On 1 October 2009, the company acquired Crosse & Blackwell's mayonnaise business for an undisclosed amount.

In 2008, Tiger Brands launched an aggressive expansion program into the rest of Africa. In the process the company bought a controlling stake in a number of food processing businesses in Nigeria, Kenya, Ethiopia, and Cameroon.

In 2010, the company established the Tiger Brands Foundation, a non-profit organisation focused on supporting school nutrition by providing South African learners in vulnerable communities with a nutritious breakfast at the beginning of every school day.

This included a R1.5 billion purchase of 65.7% in Dangote Flour Mills in October 2012, Nigeria's second largest milling operation. This and other investments in Africa proved to be costly and unproductive.

Over capacity in the Nigerian market led to an operating loss of R2.7 billion by the time Tiger sold back the operation to Dangote for a token one US dollar three years later in 2015. Management issues in Tiger's Kenya operations and the collapse of its Mozambican distributor and Deli Foods subsidiary also negatively impacted the company in this period. This led to then CEO Peter Matlare to resign in November 2015 and a reorganisation of its non-South African operations.

== Subsidiaries ==
Past and present Tiger Brands subsidiaries include:

- Durban Confectionery Works Proprietary Limited (deregistered in 2024)
- Enterprise Foods Proprietary Limited (deregistered in 2024)
- Langeberg Holdings Limited (deregistered in 2024)
- Langeberg & Ashton Foods Proprietary Limited
- Tiger Food Brands Intellectual Property Holding Company Proprietary Limited
- Tiger Consumer Brands Limited
- Tiger Brands (Mauritius) Limited
- Haco Industries Kenya Limited (sold in 2017)
- Chocolaterie Confiserie Camerounaise (sale agreement underway)
- Deli Foods Nigeria Limited (in deregistration process since 2024)
- East Africa Tiger Brands Industries (sold in 2017)
- Davita Trading Proprietary Limited
- Pharma I Investment Holdings Limited (in deregistration process)
- Tiger Branded Consumer Goods plc (sold in 2015)

== Brands ==
Jungle oats packaging from 2010 (left) and the 1930s (right)

The company's brands include:

Culinary:

- All Gold
- Benny Stock
- Black Cat
- Colman's
- Crosse & Blackwell
- Hugo's
- KOO canned foods
- Mrs H.S. Ball's Chutney
- Purity Baby Food

Bakery:

- Albany
- Tinkies

Grains:

- Aunt Caroline
- Fatti's & Moni's
- Golden Cloud
- Jungle Oats
- King Korn
- Lion
- Morvite
- Tastic

Snacks and beverages:

- All Sorts
- Beacon
- Cream Caramels
- Energade
- Game
- Hall's
- Maynards
- mmmMallows
- Oros
- Rose's Cordial
- Smoothies
- Tru-Lem

Home and personal care:

- Airoma
- Dolly Varden
- Doom
- Ingram's
- Jeyes
- No Hair
- Peaceful Sleep
- Perfect Touch

== Controversy ==
=== Listeriosis outbreak ===
Tiger Brands was implicated in the world's largest listeriosis outbreak in March 2017 when polony produced at a factory in Polokwane‚ Limpopo by its subsidiary company, Enterprise Foods, was found to be the source of the outbreak by the South African National Institute for Communicable Diseases and announced by the Minister of Health. The outbreak caused the deaths of 164 people and infected a further 872 people by 24 February 2018. By 5 March 2018 a total of 180 people were thought to have died from the outbreak. Tiger Brands stated that they had been presented with no evidence of their facility being the cause of the outbreak. Following the announcement by the Minister of Health the company's stock price dropped by 7% resulting in R5.7bn (US$438.69 million) reduction in market capitalisation.

=== Price-fixing scandals ===
==== Bread ====
In mid-November 2007, Tiger Brands was fined R98.8 million (roughly equivalent to US$12.8 million at the immediate spot exchange rate at the time) by the South African Competition Commission for colluding with other bread producers to raise the price of bread by between 30c and 35c per loaf.

According to the commission the four companies involved (Premier Foods, Tiger Brands, Foodcorp and Pioneer Foods) controlled more than 90 percent of the wheat flour market at the time. Facilitating their pricing activities through secret meetings and telephone calls between employees of these firms at various venues, including churches, stadiums and hotels. The commission also found that the price-fixing activities had a negative effect on both consumers as a whole as well as inhibiting smaller bakeries from being effective competitors.

The fine reflected 5.7% of Tiger Brand's bread sales, coming mostly from its Albany brand, for the 2006 financial year. Tiger Brands took full responsibility and then CEO Nick Dennis resigned.

==== Adcock Ingram Critical Care ====
In May 2008, Tiger Brands agreed to pay a R53.5 million fine for alleged anti-competitive practices in its health care subsidiary Adcock Ingram Critical Care (AICC). AICC executive Arthur Barnett was suspended until the investigation was concluded. In July 2008, Tiger Brands stated that it was going to unbundle its entire Adcock Ingram subsidiary with each Tiger Brands shareholder receiving one share in Adcock Ingram for every Tiger Brands share they owned.

== See also ==
- Manufacturing in South Africa
