= Mortadella =

Large Italian pork sausage

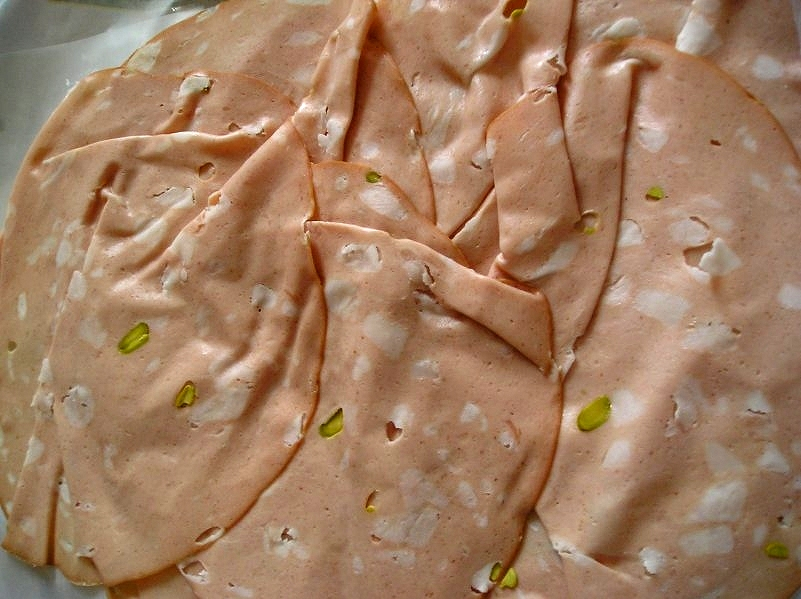
- Mortadella with pistachios from Italy
- Type: Sausage
- Place of origin: Italy

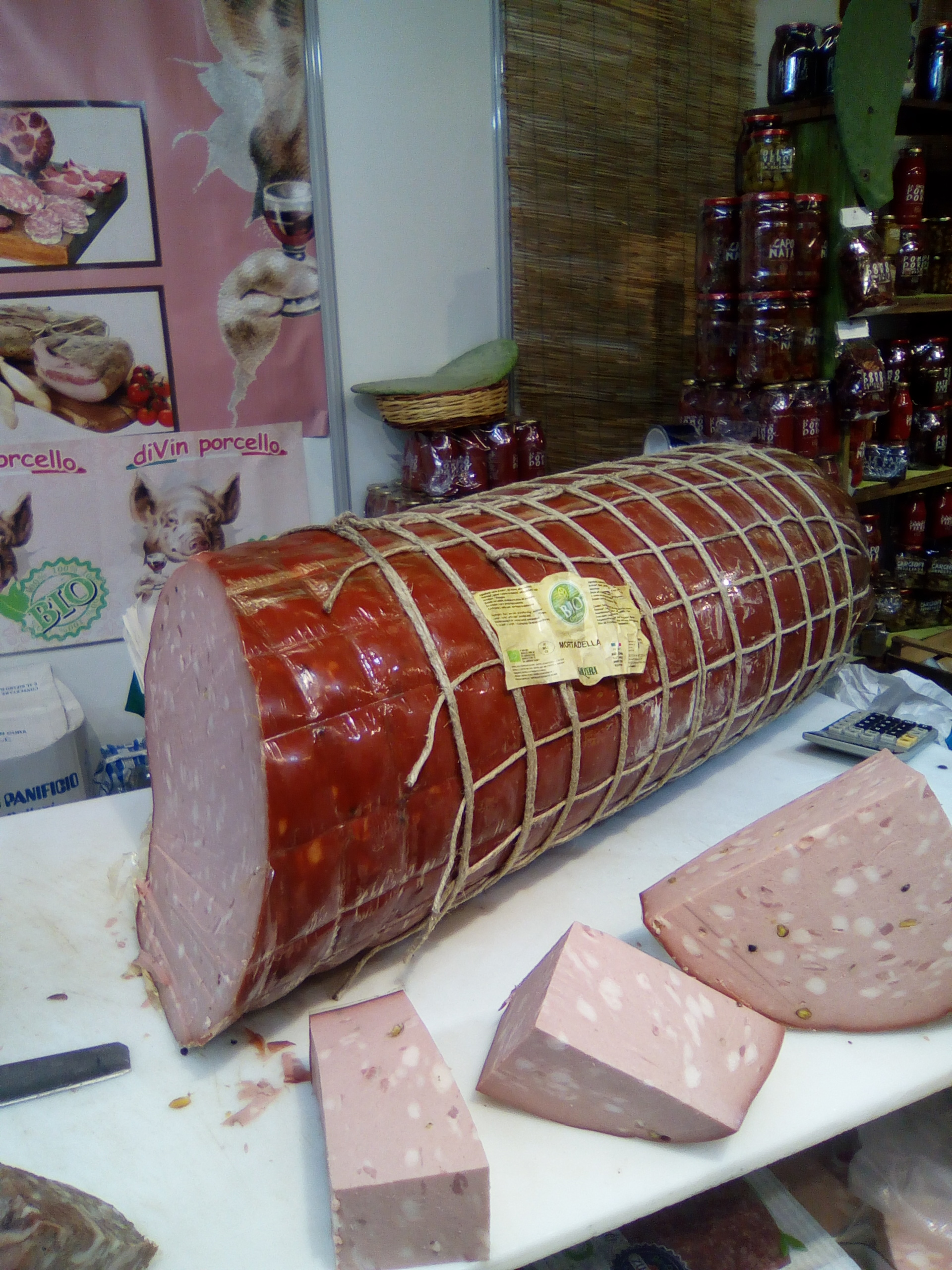
Mortadella Bologna PGI from Italy

Mortadella (Italian: [mortaˈdɛlla]) is a large salume made of finely hashed or ground cured pork, which incorporates at least 15% small cubes of pork fat (principally the hard fat from the neck of the pig). It is traditionally flavoured with peppercorns, but modern versions can also contain pistachios or less commonly, myrtle berries. The sausage is then cooked.

The best-known version of mortadella is mortadella Bologna PGI.

== Etymology ==
The origin of the name mortadella is debated. One theory derives the name from the Latin word mortarium ("mortar"), traditionally used in pounding the meat to produce the sausage. This theory, proposed by Giancarlo Susini, professor of ancient history in the University of Bologna, relies on two funerary steles kept in the Archaeological Civic Museum of Bologna, believed to pertain to the same monument, one showing a herd of piglets and the other a mortar and pestle.

Another theory, introduced by Ovidio Montalbani in the 17th century, derives the name from a Roman sausage flavoured with myrtle berries that Romans called farcimen myrtatum or farcimen murtatum (myrtle sausage). Myrtle was a popular spice before pepper became available to European markets.

== Varieties ==
=== Italy ===
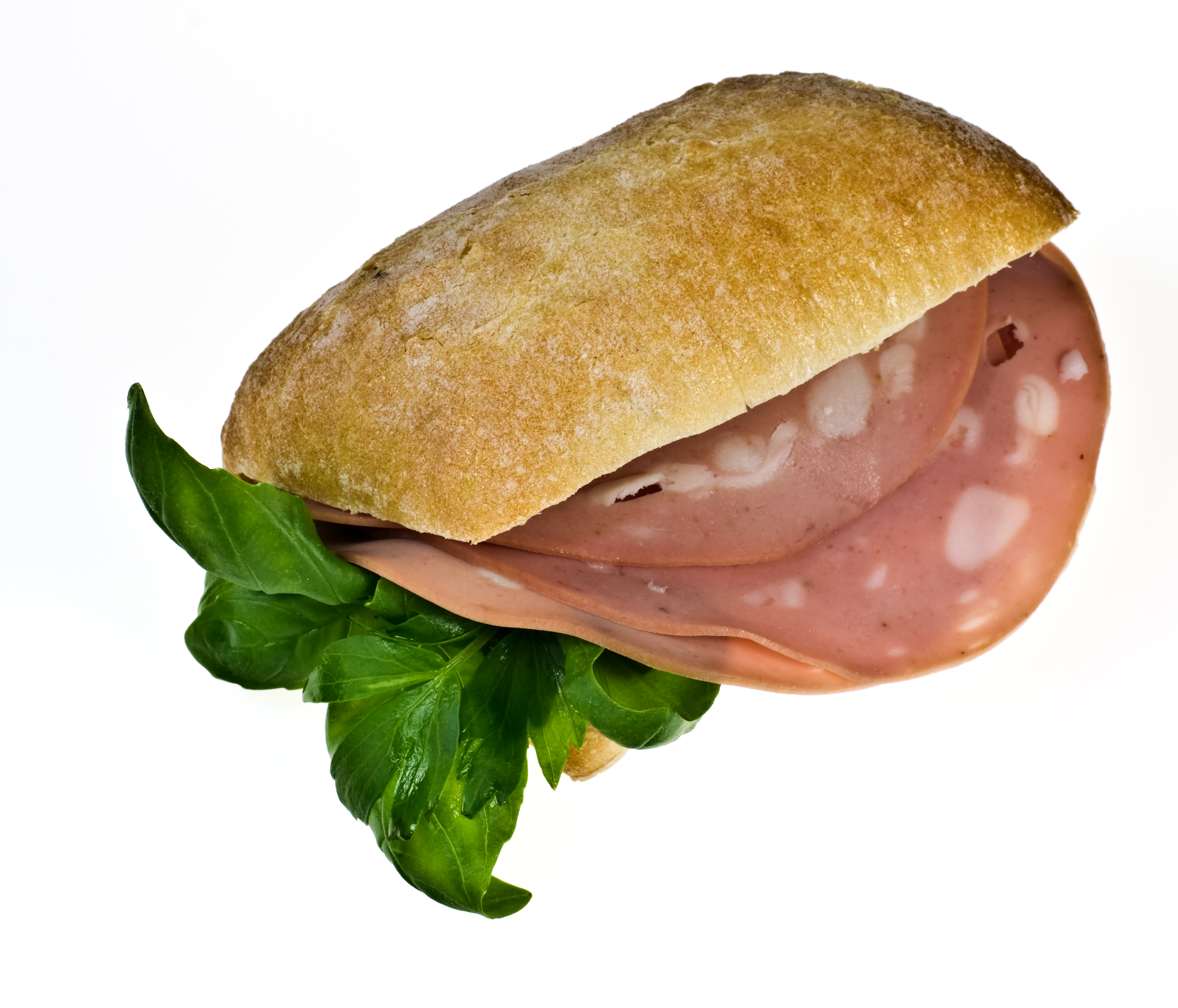
Panini with mortadella

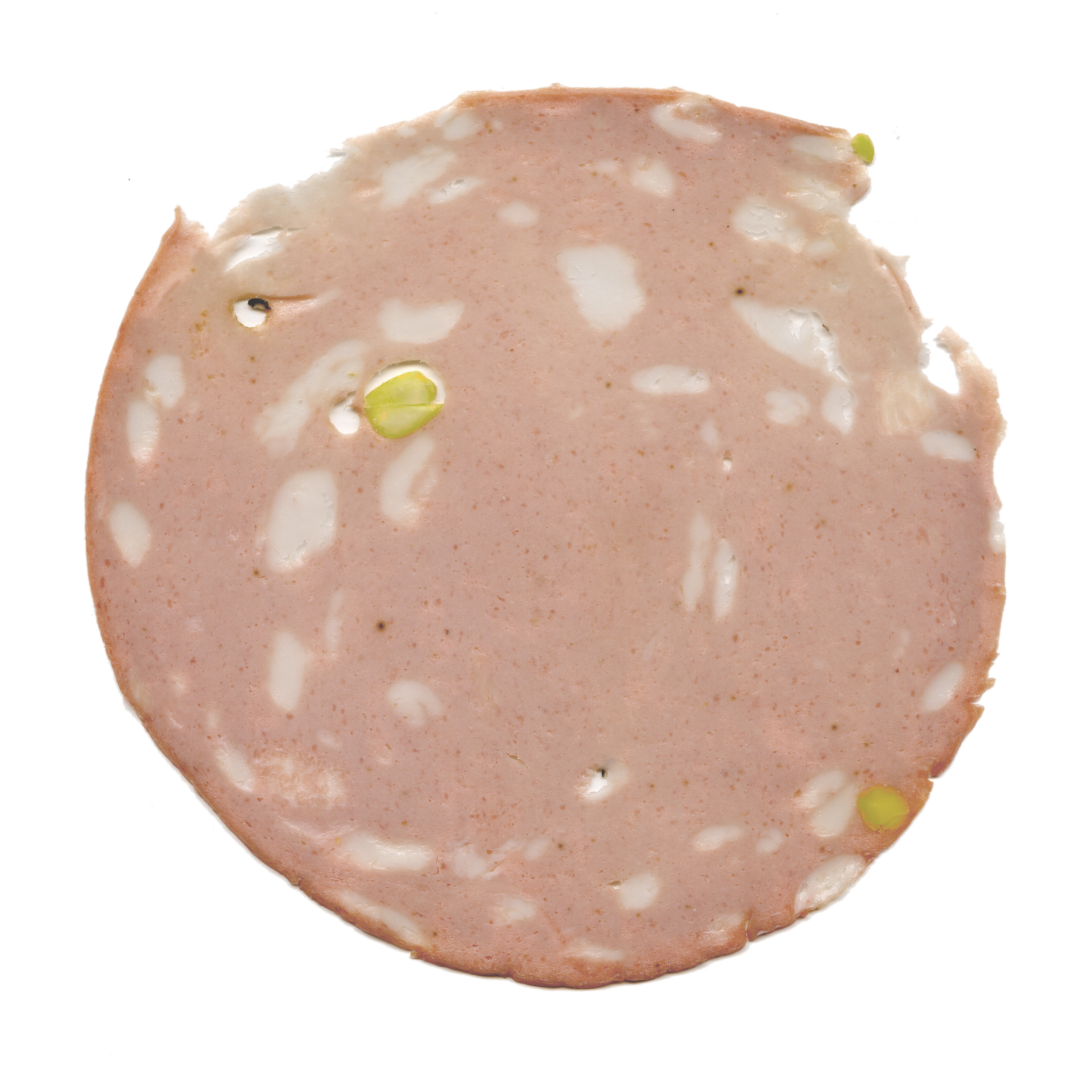
A slice of mortadella with pistachios

- Mortadella Bologna has protected geographical indication (PGI) status under European Union law and is the best known worldwide. The zone of production is extensive; as well as Emilia-Romagna and the neighbouring regions of Piedmont, Lombardy, Veneto, Marche, and Tuscany, it includes Lazio and Trentino.
- Mortadella di Campotosto, also called coglioni di mulo, produced in Abruzzo, has prodotto agroalimentare tradizionale (PAT) status.
- Mortadella di Amatrice, produced in Amatrice, Lazio, is made from minced pork and spiced with cinnamon and cloves.
- Mortadella umbra, from Preci, Umbria, is also called coglioni di mulo, like mortadella di Campotosto, and produced in a similar style.
- Mortadella di fegato, produced in Piedmont, is made from pork and pork liver and is made in two types: mortadella di fegato cotta (cooked), sometimes called mortadella d'Orta, and mortadella di fegato cruda (raw), also called fidighin in Piedmontese; both types are recognised PAT.
- Mortadella di fegato al vin brulé is produced in Lombardy and recognised PAT.
- Mortadella ossolana, produced in Piedmont, in Val d'Ossola, is made from pork and up to 5% pork liver and is recognised PAT.
- Mortadella di cavallo is made from horse meat in Albano Laziale, Lazio.
- Mortadella di Prato, produced in Tuscany, in Prato, Agliana, Quarrata, and Montale, is also defined by a PGI. It is flavoured with pounded garlic and coloured with alchermes.
- Mortadella di Camaiore, also called sbriciolona, produced in Camaiore, Tuscany, is made from minced pork and spices, including fennel seeds, cinnamon, and cloves.
- Mortadella trequandina, produced in Trequanda, Tuscany, is made from a mixture of both lean and fatty pork.
- Mortadella nostrale di Cardoso is a traditional salami produced in Versilia, Tuscany; PAT Tuscany.
- Mortadella delle Apuane is produced in Massa Carrara, especially Montignoso, Tuscany.
- Mortadella della Lunigiana, or mondiola della Garfagnana, depending on its origin, is produced in Garfagnana and Lunigiana, Tuscany.
- Mortadella di Accumoli is a traditional salami produced in Accumoli, Lazio.
- Mortadella romana, also called spianata is produced in Rome.
- Mortadella viterbese, from Viterbo, Lazio, is an industrially produced, flattened salami.
- Mortadella di manzetta maremmana is a salami made from Maremmana beef and pork from Viterbo, Lazio.
- Mortandela (note the difference in spelling), produced in Trentino-Alto Adige, in Val di Non, is made from minced pork.

=== Outside Italy ===
Some imitations of mortadella from around the world include "parizer", "polony", and "devon".

==== Brazil ====
A famous mortadella sandwich is sold at the Municipal Market of São Paulo in the city of São Paulo.

==== Middle East and North Africa ====
In several countries, such as Algeria, Egypt, Iran, Iraq, Jordan, Kuwait, Lebanon, Morocco, Israel, Palestine, Qatar, Saudi Arabia, Syria, and the United Arab Emirates, halal or kosher mortadella is sold, which is made from chicken, beef, or turkey. Siniora, a Palestinian brand established in Jerusalem in 1920, is the first in the region, a mortadella with sliced olives, pistachios, or peppercorn. The Lebanese Al-Taghziah brand is sold around the world.

==== Poland ====
In Poland, mortadela slices are sometimes dipped in batter, fried, and served with potatoes and salads as a quicker (and cheaper) alternative to traditional pork cutlets.

==== Rest of Europe ====
In Romania, a similar cold cut is also known as parizer. In Hungary, a similar product is called mortadella and a plain variety called pariser, parizer or párizsi. The term parizer is also often used in Bosnia-Herzegovina and Croatia, while parizier is used in other territories of the Balkans. It mainly differs from mortadella and similar salami in that garlic is used instead of myrtle, and it does not contain pieces of fat, pistachios, or olives.

==== Russia and former Soviet Union ====
In Russia and other former Soviet states, a very similar product is called doktorskaya kolbasa (Russian: Докторская колбаса, lit. 'doctor's sausage'). However, this product is usually made from a mixture of beef and pork (sometimes beef and lamb or chicken for religious reasons) and does not include pieces of fat or myrtle; mortadella-style sausages with bits of fat are called lubitelskaya and stolichnaya. Instead, it is flavoured with just cardamom, sometimes coriander and nutmeg, and also traditionally contains eggs and milk, which are usually absent in traditional mortadella. Unlike mortadella, doktorskaya kolbasa contains lower amounts of fat and is high in proteins.

The name "doctor's sausage" was coined in the Soviet Union in the 1930s to refer to sausages and meat products recommended by doctors to help with undernourishment and stomach problems. During the Soviet era, it was commonly advertised as being nutritious (due to its low fat content) and remains popular throughout former Soviet states to the present day.

==== United States ====
Mortadella was banned from import into the United States from 1967 to 2000 due to an outbreak of African swine fever in Italy. The ban in the United States was lifted due to a veterinary equivalency agreement that allowed countries to export products that had been shown to be disease-free as part of an overall agreement that would allow products deemed safe in the United States to be exported to the European Union. The plot of the 1971 comedy film Lady Liberty, starring Sophia Loren, is based on the United States ban on mortadella.

In the 2020s, mortadella experienced a surge of interest, with numerous restaurants in New York and Los Angeles featuring mortadella dishes.

==== Vietnam ====
Chả lụa or Vietnamese mortadella is sometimes used as an accompaniment to the Vietnamese dish bánh cuốn.

== See also ==
- Mortadella di Campotosto
- Bologna sausage
- Pigs in culture
