= 2017–2018 South African listeriosis outbreak =

Widespread outbreak of food poisoning

2017–2018 South Africa listeriosis outbreak
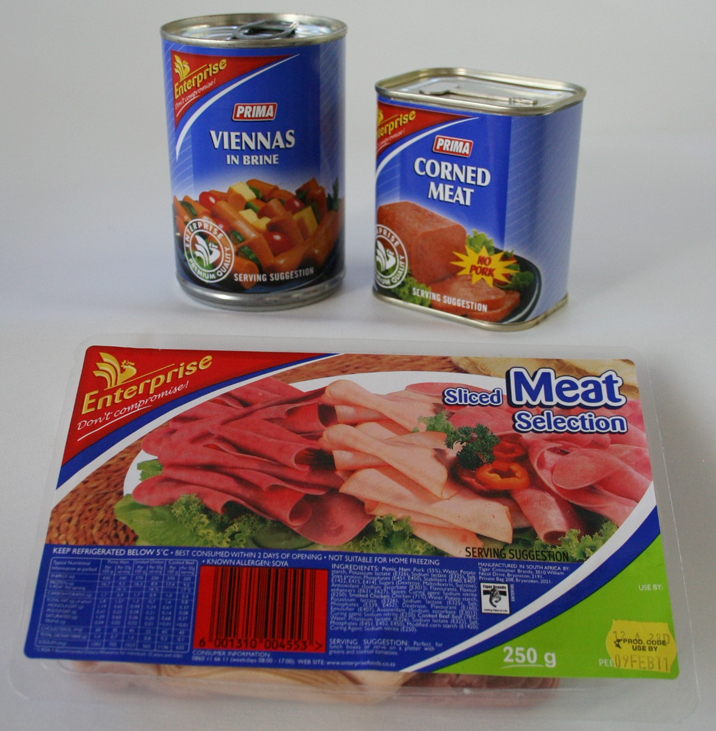
- The outbreak was from processed meats produced by Enterprise Foods in Polokwane.
- Date: 2017 – March 2018
- Location: South Africa
- Deaths: 216
- Injuries: 1,060 confirmed cases

The 2017–2018 South African listeriosis outbreak was a widespread outbreak of Listeria monocytogenes food poisoning that resulted from contaminated processed meats produced by Enterprise Foods, a subsidiary of Tiger Brands, in Polokwane. There were 1,060 confirmed cases of listeriosis during the outbreak, and about 216 deaths. It is the world's deadliest listeriosis outbreak.

== Investigation of the origin ==
Prior to 2017, an average of 60 to 80 listeriosis cases were confirmed in South Africa per year. The outbreak was first identified by doctors at Chris Hani and Steve Biko academic hospitals in July 2017, who notified the National Institute for Communicable Diseases (NICD) about an unusually high number of neonatal infections.

Interviews conducted by the authorities with people who contracted listeriosis indicated that processed cold meats, most notably polony, were the likely cause of the outbreak. The source of the outbreak at the Enterprise Foods facility was only discovered after nine five-year-old children from Soweto were brought to Chris Hani Baragwanath Hospital in mid-January 2018. Samples taken from Enterprise and Rainbow Chicken polony products at the crèche the children attended tested positive for the strain of listeriosis causing the outbreak and led investigators to the infected production facilities.

On March 4, 2018, Health Minister Aaron Motsoaledi announced that the disease was traced to the Enterprise processed meats factory in Polokwane. Environmental samples from the factory were found to contain the bacterium Listeria monocytogenes strain ST 6, the strain responsible for the outbreak. Additionally, further samples from another Enterprise factory in Germiston and from a Rainbow Chicken factory in the Free State tested positive for Listeria, although which strain these samples tested positive for is not yet known.

In 2024, the National Health Laboratory Service confirmed that the ST6 strain that was predominantly responsible for the outbreak was only found in Tiger Brands’ Enterprise facility in Polokwane and nowhere else.

== Impact ==
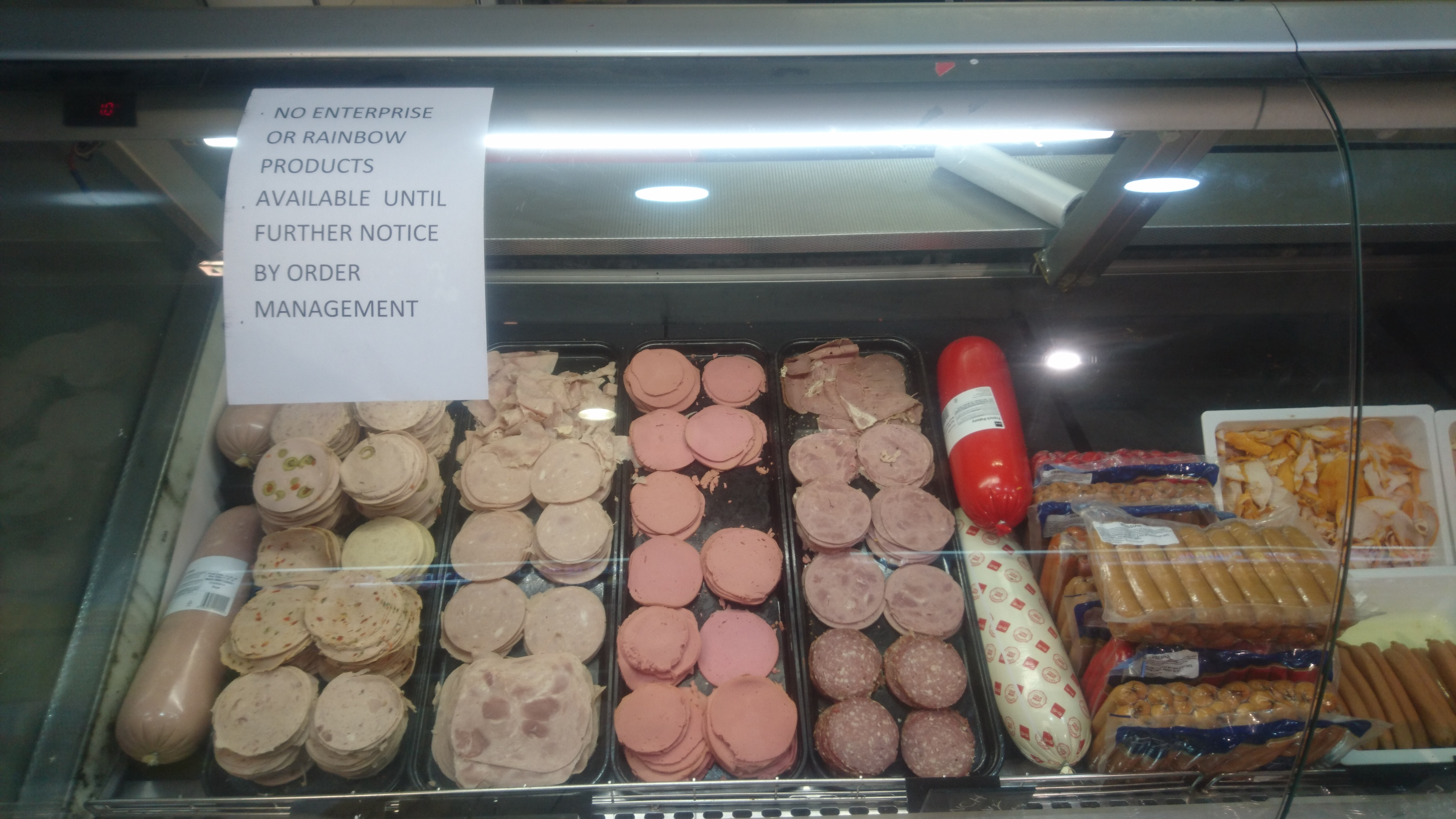
A range of processed meats – polony meats dyed pink to the right of the sign – for sale in a South African supermarket in Cape Town. A note states that all Enterprise and Rainbow Chicken products have been recalled.

Laboratory-confirmed listeriosis cases started to rise in mid-2017 and peaked in December 2017, with 32 cases in a week. Gauteng was the province with the most cases, 58%, followed by Western Cape with about 13%. A report from the National Department of Health in July 2018 stated there had been 1,060 laboratory-confirmed cases of listeriosis, and 216 deaths.

=== Reactions after cause was known ===
Following the announcement, Tiger Brand's stock price on the Johannesburg Stock Exchange dropped by 7%, resulting in a R5.7bn (equivalent to US$438.69 million) reduction in total value. At a press conference the next day, Tiger Brands CEO Lawrence MacDougall denied responsibility, stating "There is no direct link between any of the deaths and our products." When pressed by journalists, he refused to apologize.

The South African government issued a recall notice of all products of RCL Foods Limited and Enterprise Foods and Rainbow Chicken facilities on March 4. Tiger Brands reportedly admitted to knowing about the presence of listeria in some of its products eighteen days before the government recall.

On March 5, Botswana, Namibia, Mauritius, Mozambique, Malawi and Zambia suspended all imports of processed meat from South Africa. Kenya followed suit on the next day.

In December 2018 the South Gauteng High Court granted a certification order opening up the process for class-action lawsuit against Tiger Brands for around 1,000 claimants. Each claimant might be eligible to seek between R100,000 and R2,000,000 in compensation for their losses due to the outbreak. On April 25, 2025, Tiger Brands made a settlement offer in the lawsuit without admitting liability.
