= Bologna sandwich =

Sandwich common in the United States and Canada

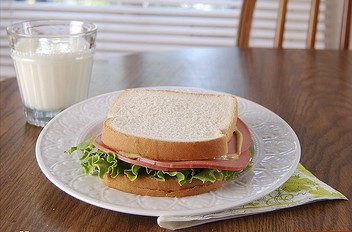
- A typical bologna sandwich with lettuce and condiments
- Alternative names: Baloney sandwich
- Type: Sandwich
- Place of origin: United States
- Region or state: Southeastern
- Main ingredients: Sliced white bread, bologna sausage, condiments

A bologna sandwich or a baloney sandwich is a sandwich – common in the United States and Canada – made from bologna sausage between slices of bread, along with various condiments, such as mayonnaise, mustard, and ketchup.

The bologna sandwich is a regional specialty in the Eastern, Midwestern, Appalachian, and Southern United States. It is a sandwich served at lunch counters of small, family-run markets that surround the Great Smoky Mountains, and fried bologna sandwiches can be found on restaurant menus in many places in the South. The fried version is likewise sometimes sold at concession stands in stadiums, like those of the Cincinnati Reds. In Pittsburgh, Pennsylvania, it is called a "jumbo" sandwich. In Knoxville, Tennessee, the sandwich is referred to in local slang as a "Lonsdale ham" sandwich, after the less-affluent neighborhood of Lonsdale in Knoxville. In Oklahoma, barbecue bologna is often smoked for sandwiches.

== See also ==
- List of sandwiches
