= Doctor's sausage =

Variety of boiled sausage in Russia

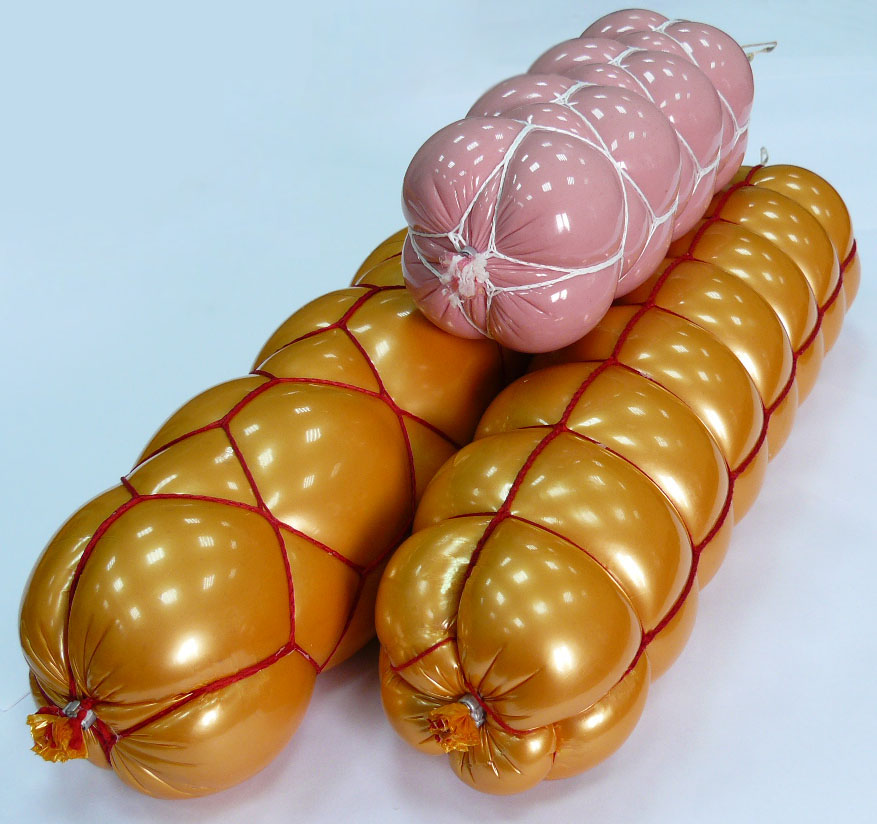
Doctor's sausage

Doctor's sausage (Russian: Докторская колбаса, romanized: Doktorskaya kolbasa) is the name given to an emulsified boiled sausage product in Russia and other former Soviet republics, corresponding to GOST standard 23670-79. It is similar in size to bologna, mortadella or Jagdwurst but much lower in fat. It is considered a diet product, with pale pink color and low fat content.

In accordance with the legislation of the Eurasian Economic Union, no meat products may be released using names that are similar to the names of meat products established by interstate (regional) standards, with the exception of meat products manufactured according to these standards. In the technical regulations, as an example of such a name, "doctor's sausage" (along with some others) is given.

== History ==
This sausage was first produced in the Soviet Union in 1936, after the All-Russian Research Institute of the Meat Industry developed a recipe for sausage and the technology for its production. Its first production run was carried out at the Moscow Meat Processing Plant named after Anastas Mikoyan. The sausage was intended to be a dietary supplement for people exhibiting signs of prolonged starvation (specifically "patients with compromised health as a result of the civil war"), hence its name. Because it was a mild-tasting, inexpensive and relatively healthy source of meat, doctor's sausage became very popular in the USSR. It is still produced today in Russia and many post-Soviet states.

== Recipe ==
The recipe for doctor's sausage, which was used as an industry standard from 1936 to 1974:

- 15 kg beef
- 25 kg fatty pork
- 60 kg lean pork
- 2.5 kg salt
- 30 g potassium nitrate or 3 g sodium nitrite
- 100 g sugar
- 30 g cardamom or nutmeg

=== Later changes ===
Starting in 1974, due to food shortages and other economic downturns in the Soviet Union, the industry standard for doctor's sausage was altered to include fillers and other low-cost ingredients to stretch the meat. The alteration of the recipe is sometimes cited as one of the events presaging the eventual downfall of the Soviet Union.
