= Smiley fritz =

South Australian sliced sausage

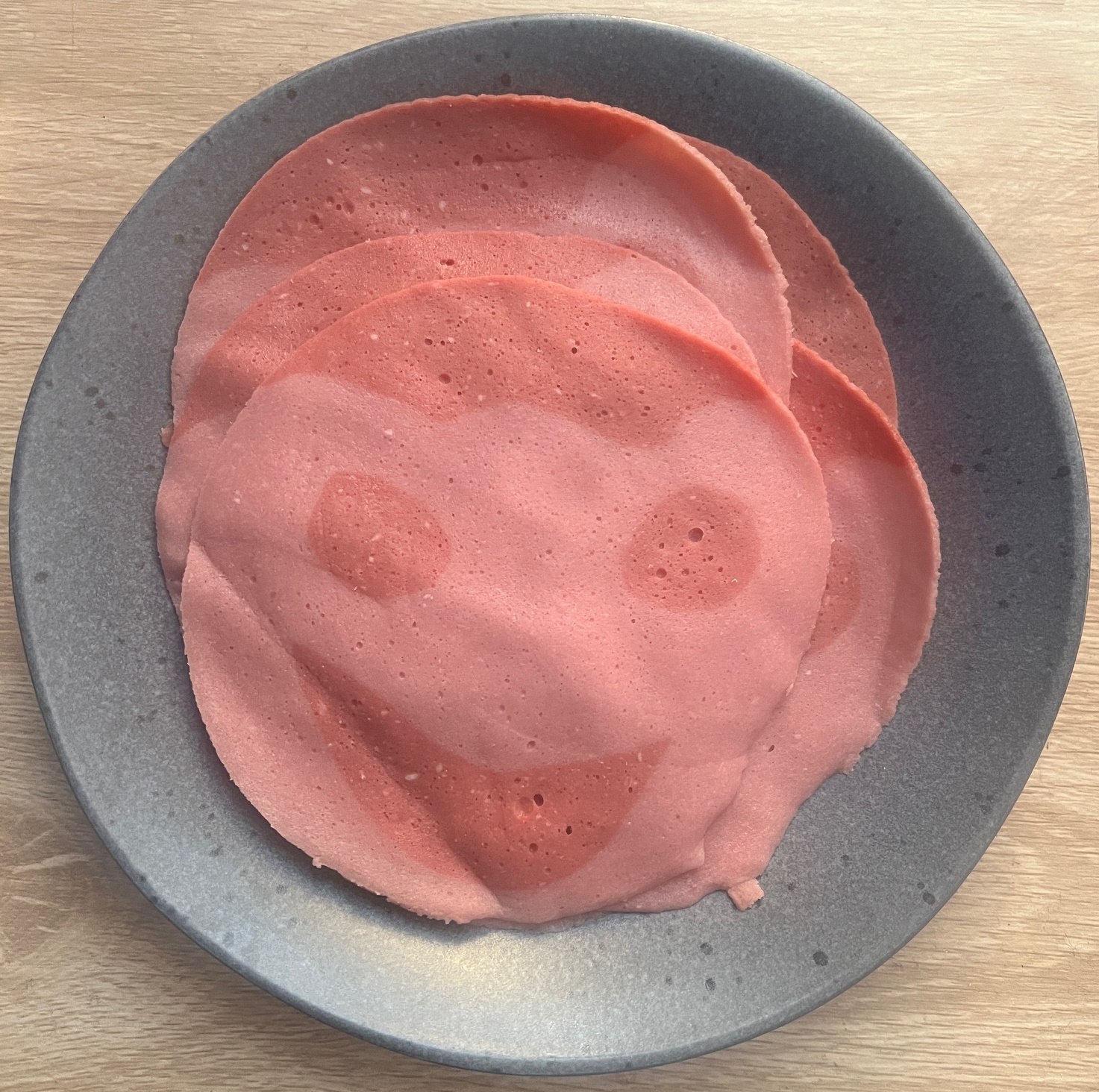
- Slices of smiley fritz
- Type: Sliced sausage
- Place of origin: South Australia
- Main ingredients: Pork meat
- Ingredients generally used: Basic spices, binders, and dye

Smiley fritz is a traditional South Australian variety of devon dyed in such a way that it reveals a smiling face as it is cut. Devon is a manufactured meat product available in Australia and New Zealand that is known under different regional names, but the South Australian variety, known locally as Fritz, uses some different ingredients to those found in similar products in other states.

A vegan version of smiley fritz was released in 2021.

== Ban ==
Smiley fritz has traditionally been provided free to children at South Australian butchers and supermarkets. This led to controversy when free smiley fritz was banned from a Tanunda supermarket in 2019 due to being a "slipping hazard". There were rumours that smiley fritz and fairy bread had been banned from South Australian schools in early 2024, but the Department of Education issued a clarification that it, along with other lunch meats, were not recommended, but they were not banned.
