= Barbecue bologna =

Barbecue dish from Oklahoma

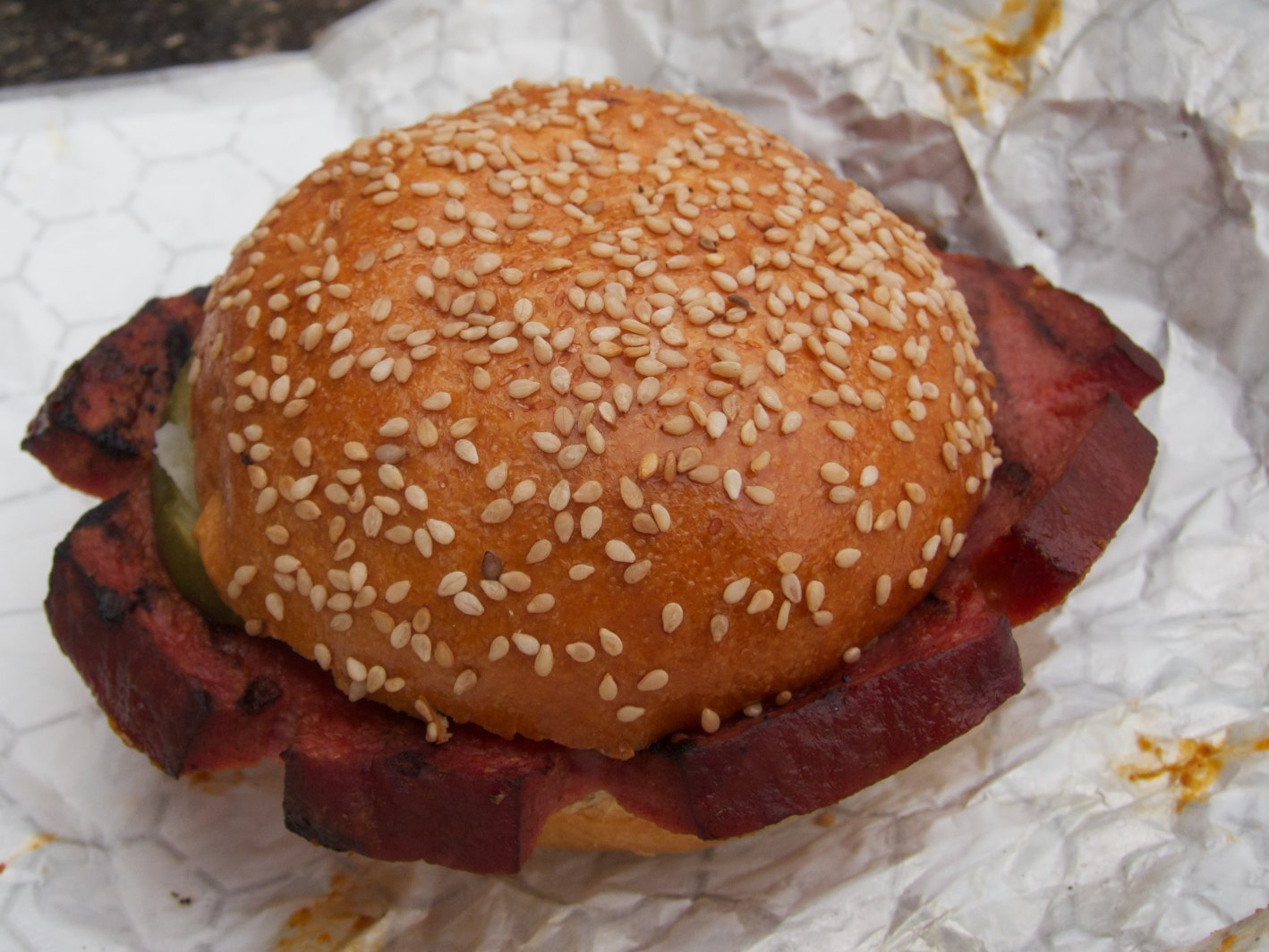
- Type: Smoked meat
- Course: Main course, appetizer
- Place of origin: Oklahoma, US
- Associated cuisine: Cuisine of the Southern United States
- Main ingredients: Bologna sausage

Barbecue bologna or smoked bologna is a barbecue dish from the US state of Oklahoma. It has been nicknamed Oklahoma tenderloin, Oklahoma prime rib, or Oklahoma steak. It is also sometimes served in Tennessee and Texas.

== Description ==
The dish is prepared by smoking a tube, or chub, of bologna sausage, typically over pecan wood. The outside of the bologna is scored in a square or diamond pattern before smoking, allowing the smoke to penetrate and flavor the meat. The sausage may be coated with apple juice during the smoking process to keep it moist.

The bologna may be made of beef, pork, chicken, or any combination of those meats. Sometimes the meat is seasoned before smoking. Sweet spice rubs are preferred because of the natural saltiness and high nitrate content of the bologna. Slices of smoked bologna are often grilled before consumption, and then dressed in a tomato and mustard-based barbecue sauce.

Barbecue bologna is typically eaten as a sandwich on a bun or white bread, sometimes in combination with other barbecue meats. It is also a component of a barbecue platter.

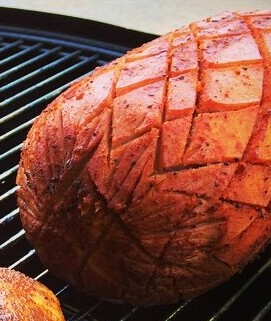
Barbecue bologna on a grill

== History ==
Barbecue bologna was created in Oklahoma. It is hypothesized to have become popular because of bologna sausage's low price in comparison to other popular barbecue meats. The dish has been nicknamed Oklahoma tenderloin, Oklahoma prime rib, and Oklahoma steak. Barbecue bologna's city of origin is debated, but is often credited to barbecue restaurants in either Tulsa or Oklahoma City. The dish is considered to be a staple of Oklahoma barbecue. Food Network Magazine named the smoked bologna sandwich as the sandwich that represented the state of Oklahoma in 2012.

Smoked bologna is also commonly served in Tennessee as part of Memphis-style barbecue. During the 2010s, it began to be served in Texas restaurants as well, despite not being a traditional part of barbecue in Texas.

== See also ==
- Bologna sausage
