= Mortadella di Campotosto =

Italian regional salami

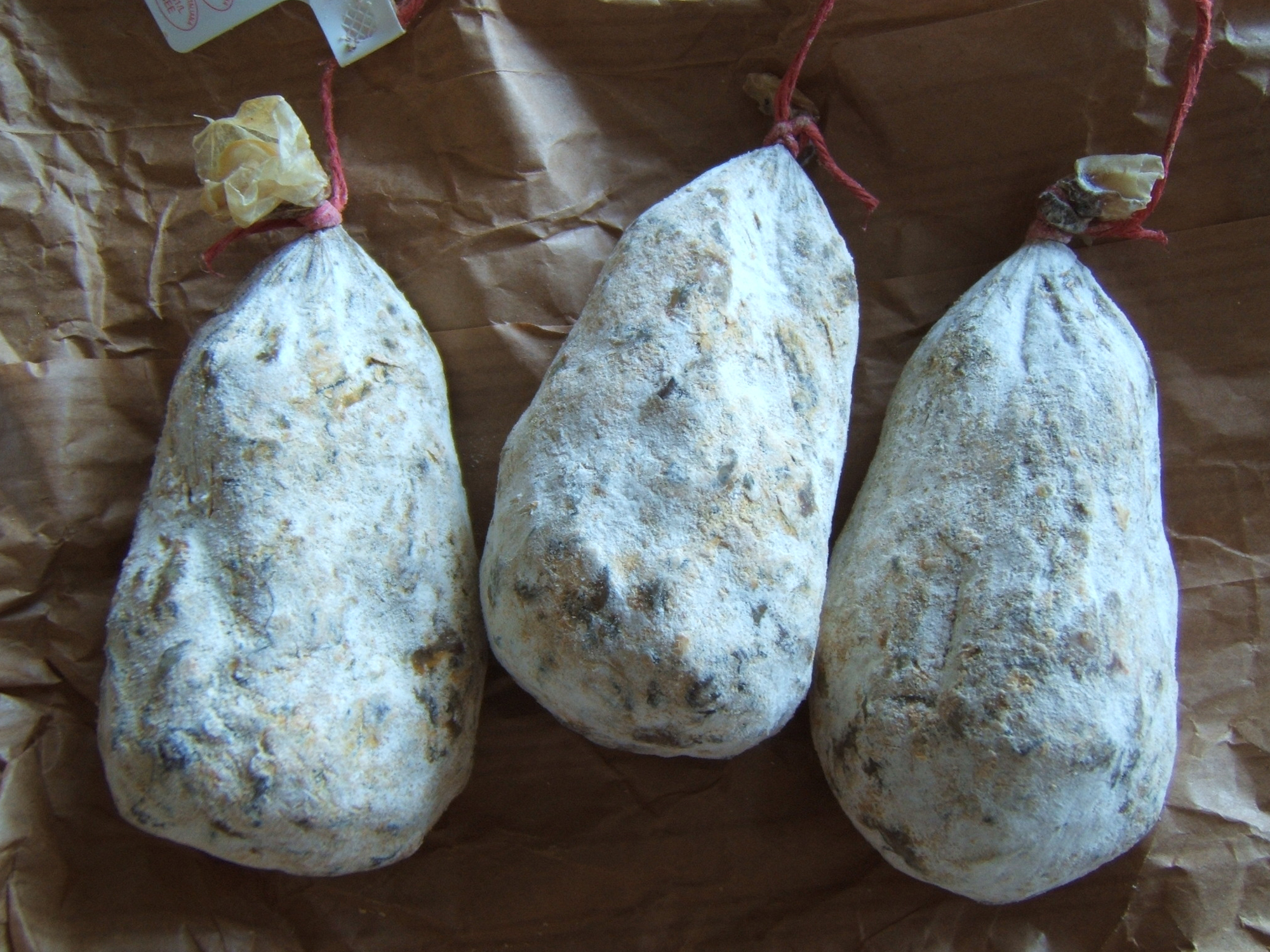
Three coglioni di mulo

Mortadella di Campotosto (popularly called coglioni di mulo) is a salami produced in limited quantities in the territory of the comune (municipality) of Campotosto, in the province of L'Aquila, Abruzzo. It is listed as a prodotto agroalimentare tradizionale (PAT) by the Italian Ministry of Agricultural, Food and Forestry Policies.

== History ==
For a period of time the city of Amatrice had appropriated the paternity of the salami, following the dominion it had over the areas of Campotosto and neighboring villages in the medieval period. The tradition of mortadella di Campotosto is very ancient and is believed to be more than 500 years old as we know it today, although only a few Campotostari continue the tradition of mortadella, and only a few palates have the opportunity to taste it today, due to the rarity of the product.

It is included in the Slow Food movement Ark of Taste, an international catalogue of endangered heritage foods.

== Description ==
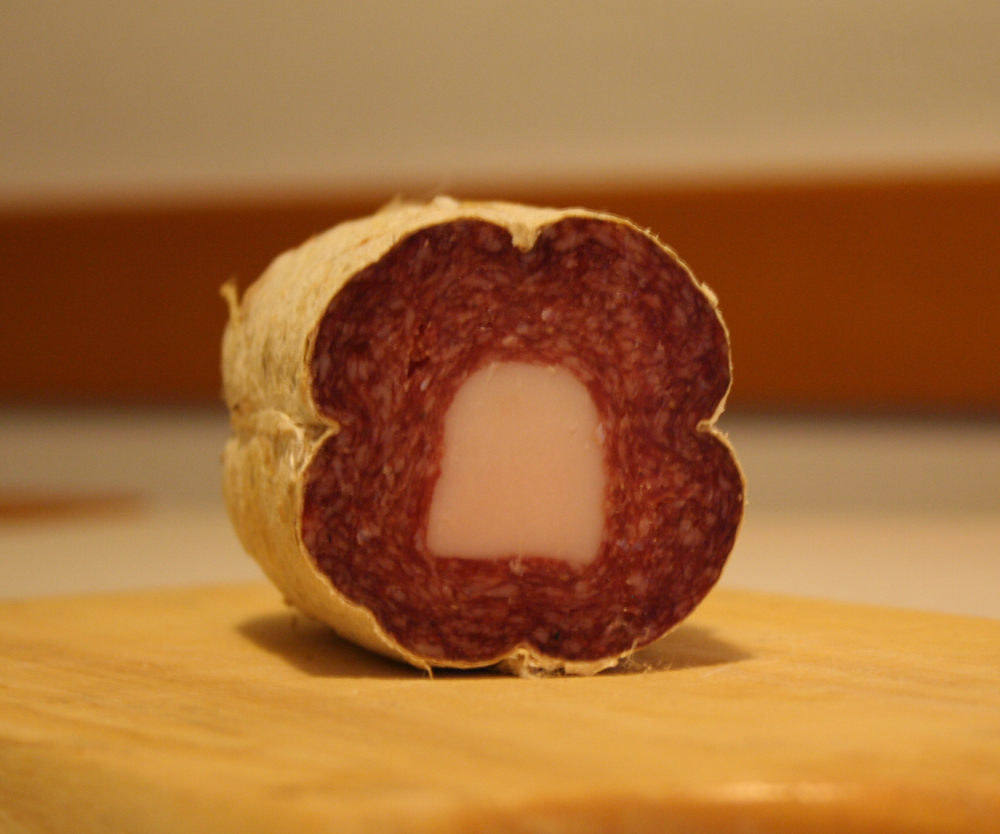
Mortadella di Campotosto

Mortadella di Campotosto is made only of pork, which swineherds and various farmers raised in the territory of the Monti della Laga. It has an ovoid shape (and a weight traditionally identified as 330 g). It has a fine grain and, inside, it has a lard core along its entire length that characterizes the product compared to other cured meats. When cut, the section has a pink color, while the central core of lard has a white color.

== See also ==
- Mortadella
