= Bologna cake =

Savory cake from the Southern United States

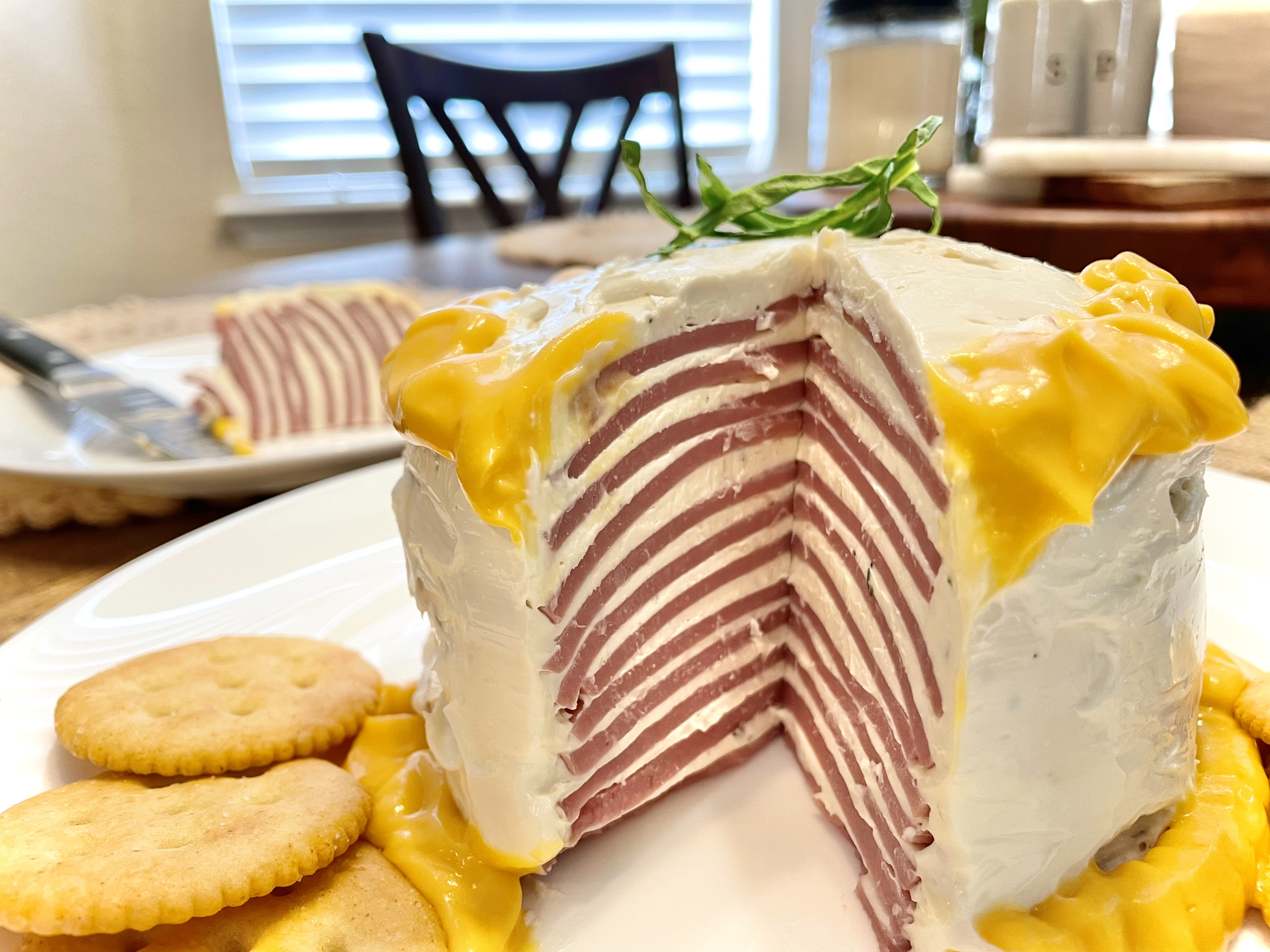
- Alternative names: Baloney cake
- Type: Savory cake
- Course: Appetizer, side dish
- Place of origin: United States
- Main ingredients: Bologna sausage, cream cheese, ranch dressing

Bologna cake, also known as baloney cake, is a dish from the Southern United States.

== Ingredients and preparation ==
The dish consists of layers of sliced bologna sausage and cream cheese with ranch dressing or other seasoning for the cream cheese. Some variations include substituting bologna with other cold-cut deli meats such as ham or salami. In place of ranch dressing, the cream cheese can be seasoned with onion powder, garlic powder, Worcestershire sauce or an Italian seasoning blend. Cheez Whiz is often used to decorate the cake. The cake can be topped with olives, pickles, bacon bits, or fresh herbs. It is frequently served with crackers or toast. Preparing a bologna cake is relatively inexpensive, technically straightforward, and easy.

== History ==
The origins of bologna cake are unclear but can be traced back to the mid-20th century. It is theorized that it started as a joke.

Although bologna cake is often considered a retro dish, it has seen a recent resurgence in popularity among younger generations who enjoy trying unusual and unconventional recipes. Bologna cake has become a social media sensation on platforms such as YouTube and TikTok, with many home cooks sharing their own unique versions of the dish online. It can be found served as an appetizer or side dish at family events.

== Health concerns ==
The dish is high in sodium, and can be dangerous for those with hypertension. It also contains high levels of fat and preservatives, such as nitrates.

== See also ==
- Bologna sausage
- Smörgåstårta
