= Mortadella sandwich =

Brazilian sandwich

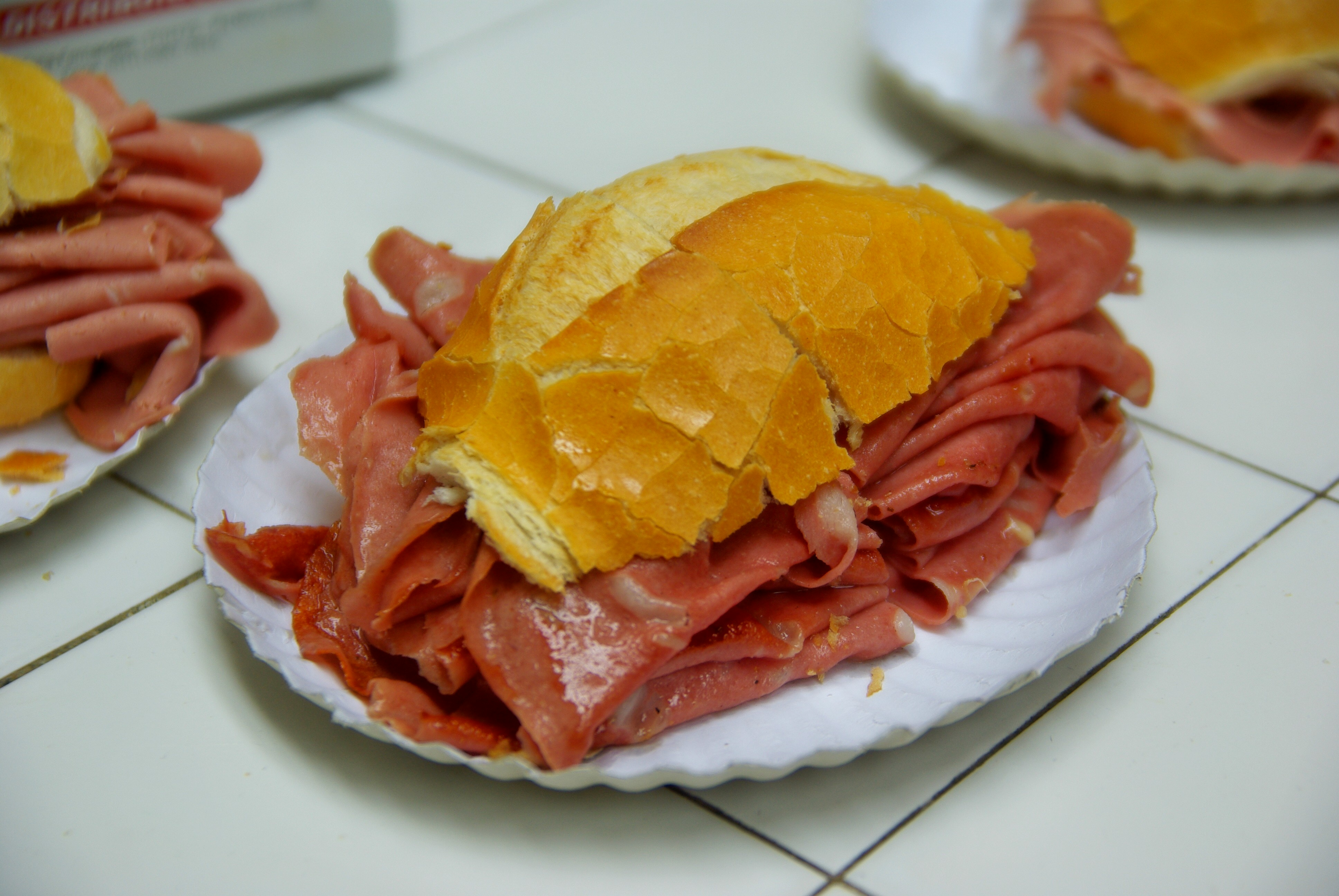
- A mortadella sandwich from the Municipal Market of São Paulo
- Type: Sandwich
- Place of origin: Brazil
- Region or state: City of São Paulo, São Paulo
- Main ingredients: Pão francês, mortadella

The mortadella sandwich (Portuguese: sanduíche de mortadela) is a Brazilian sandwich consisting of mortadella inside pão francês. It is considered a specialty in the Municipal Market of São Paulo (Mercadão) in the city of São Paulo. While there are many establishments selling mortadella sandwiches at Mercadão, one of the best known is Bar do Mané, a small restaurant which claims to have made them since opening in 1933. The mortadella sandwiches from Bar do Mané are known for their size and have an average of 300 grams (11 oz) of pan-fried mortadella served on a pão francês, with or without cheese.

== History ==
While the origin of the mortadella sandwich is uncertain, it is believed to have originated in either Hocca Bar or Bar do Mané in the Municipal Market of São Paulo. It is said that the original mortadella sandwich at Bar do Mané was significantly smaller as their prices were set by a regulatory body so establishments served their sandwiches with very little filling. Once the price of sandwiches was no longer regulated, the owner of Bar do Mané significantly increased the amount of mortadella used in the sandwich to differentiate itself from his competitor's sandwiches. Another story tells that more mortadella was added to satisfy a client who complained about the small amount of filling. The sandwich became incredibly popular after this and was first recognized in a publication on 10 July 1979 after a piece was published by Estadão.

== Recognition ==
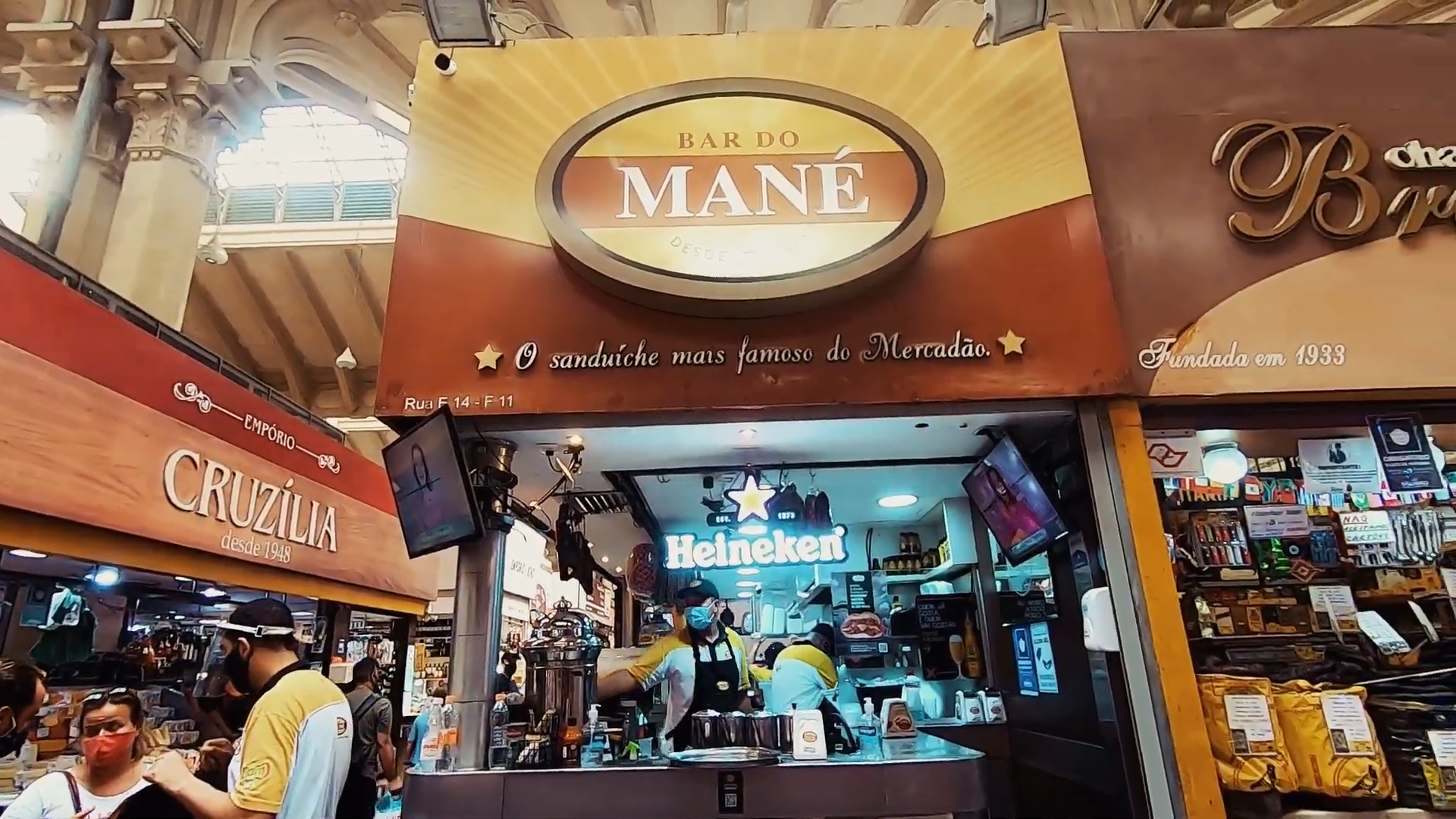
Bar do Mané, one of the contenders for the invention of the Mortadella sandwich

American television chef Anthony Bourdain created a mortadella sandwich recipe using provolone cheese, sourdough or Kaiser rolls, and mustard and mayonnaise inspired by this sandwich. American celebrity chef David Chang called the mortadella sandwich at Bar do Mané "one of the best things [he's] ever eaten". Terry Crews, the actor who played Julius in the show Everybody Hates Chris, which is widely popular in Brazil, called the sandwich "so good" and "amazing" after trying one at Bar do Mané.

Bob's and McDonald's have served mortadella sandwiches in São Paulo to commemorate the anniversary of the founding of city of São Paulo.

== See also ==
- List of sandwiches
