= Mrs H.S. Ball's Chutney =

South African brand of chutney

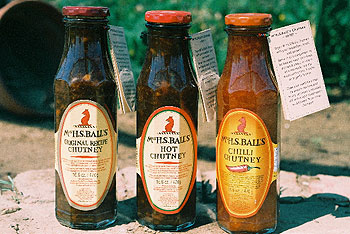
Three flavors of Mrs H.S. Ball's Chutney.

Mrs. H.S. Ball's Chutney (traditionally known as blatjang in South Africa) is a traditional South African sauce that has been made since 1914.

== History ==
Mrs. H.S. Ball was born Amelia Alice Elizabeth Adkins in King William’s Town on 23 March 1865. She was the daughter of Henry James Adkins, a retailer from Gonubie, and Sarah Adkins, née Spalding. She later married Herbert Sandleton Ball, a railway superintendent from Cape Town, and the couple settled in Cape Town. The young bride received the coveted secret chutney recipe as a gift from her mother—a recipe that had been passed down from mother to daughter in their family for generations.

At the outbreak of the First World War in 1914, the chutney was produced on a small scale, given as gifts to friends, or sold at church bazaars. It grew in popularity, and the Ball family kitchen was transformed into a makeshift production line. As demand increased, Amelia and Herbert—with the assistance of Cape Town businessman Fred Metter—scaled up production. Metter was also responsible for designing the octagonal bottle that is still used for the chutney today.

The Woodstock factory opened in 1917 to meet the growing demand for the chutney; later, as exports to Great Britain increased, an even larger facility was opened in Diep River. Amelia passed away in 1962 at the age of 97, content in the knowledge that the secret recipe had been entrusted only to her son and grandson. Over the years, Mrs. H.S. Ball's is part of Unilever Foods and in April 2013 it became a subsidiary of Tiger Consumer Brands Limited.

== SS Quanza ==
Some sources claim that Amelia Adkins’s father was the captain of the ship SS Quanza, and that her parents were compelled to settle in King William’s Town after the ship was wrecked near the coast of East London in 1852, while en route from Canada to Australia. This is, however, incorrect. Amelia’s parents were married in King William’s Town on 16 February 1852, and the SS Quanza was only wrecked near East London on 26 May 1872. The shipwreck was sold to Henry James Adkins for salvage. Amelia’s mother, Sarah Spalding, was born in 1836 in Halifax, Nova Scotia, where her father, Alexander Spalding, was stationed while serving in the British Army. In August 1845, he was transferred to South Africa, where he and his family settled. He retired in King William’s Town in 1853.
