= Lebanon bologna =

Type of sausage

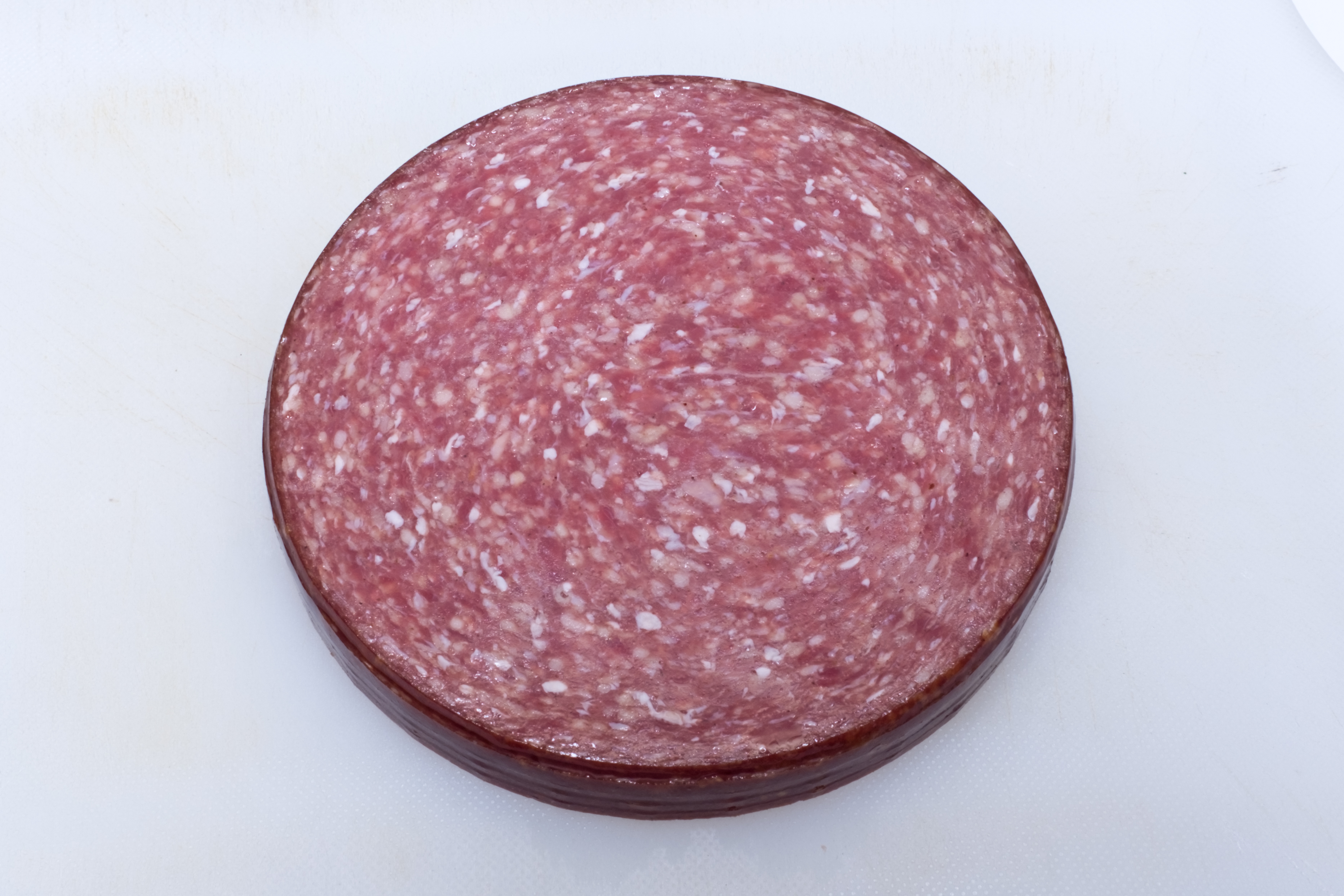
- Type: Sausage
- Place of origin: Lebanon County, Pennsylvania, US
- Associated cuisine: Pennsylvania Dutch
- Main ingredients: Beef
- Ingredients generally used: Spices

Lebanon bologna is a type of American cured, smoked, and fermented semidry beef sausage; it is not, in spite of its name, a pork-based bologna. It is typically served as a cold cut or appetizer.

Lebanon bologna has a distinct, tangy flavor, more so than other generally similar fermented meat products such as summer sausage. Hardwood smoking imparts a strong smokiness to the traditionally prepared versions of the product.

== Origin ==
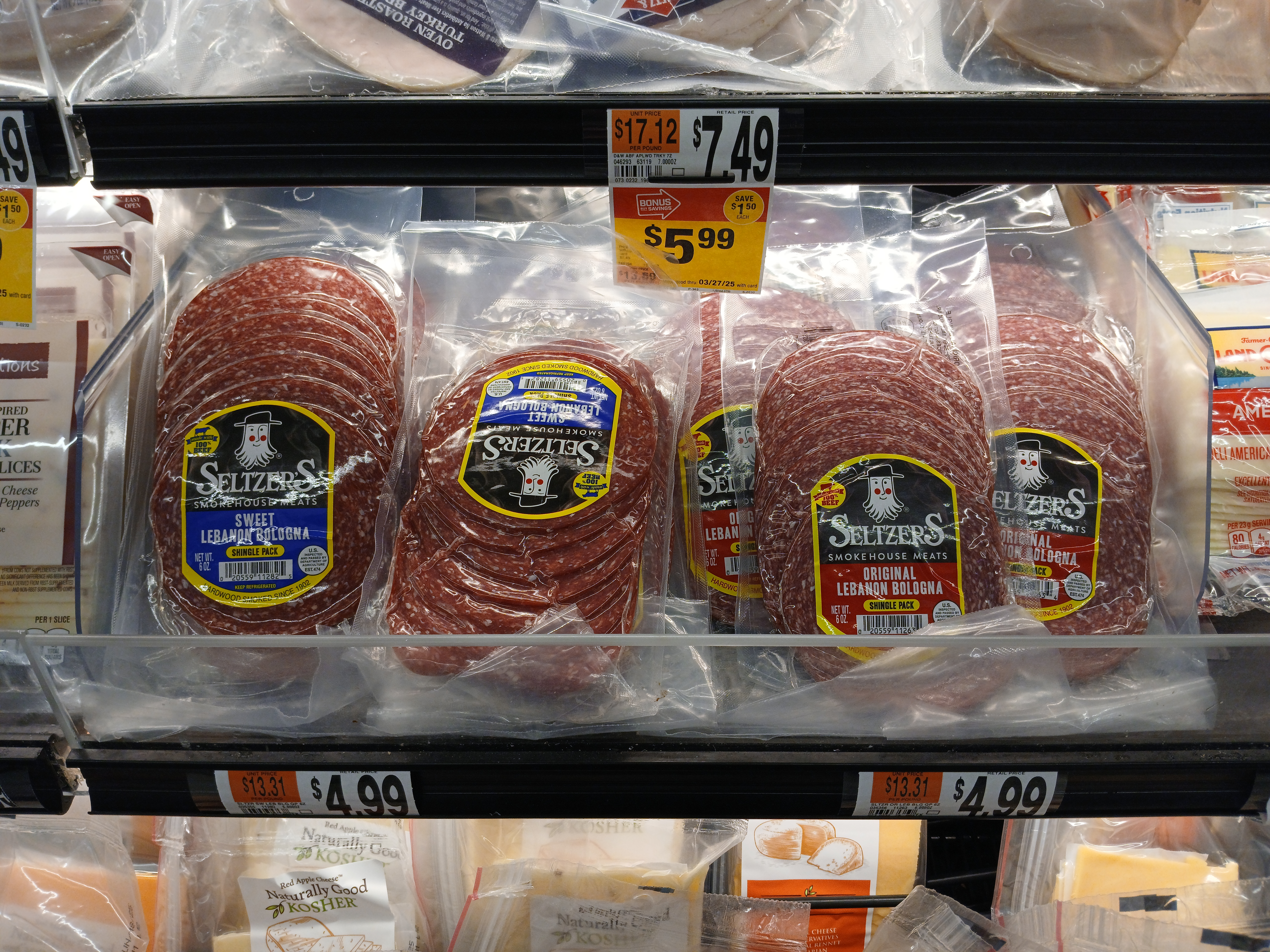
Packages of Seltzer's Lebanon bologna for sale in Fairfax County, Virginia

Lebanon bologna was developed by the Pennsylvania Dutch of Lebanon County, Pennsylvania, prior to the 1780s and was a common item by the early 1800s, reflecting the slow-cured and smoked sausage traditions of Western Europe. Still produced primarily in that area, it is found in markets throughout the United States and typically served as a cold cut and as an appetizer. In addition to the original, a sweet version is made.

== Manufacture ==
Typically, curing salts are added to the ground and spiced beef to control microbial growth during processing. The blended and stuffed sausage is then aged for 10 days prior to smoking to enrich lactic acid bacteria and allow for the reduction of nitrate to nitrite. Fermentation occurs during a slow cold smoke (kept at a temperature below 120 °F (49 °C)) that can last for up to four days. A one pH unit (or more) decline is observed during this step, as well as the development of nitrosohemochrome, the pigment responsible for the red color of cured meats.

== See also ==
- List of smoked foods
- Bologna sausage
