= Adcock Ingram =

South African pharmaceutical company

- Formerly: EJ Adcock Pharmacy (at founding)
- Type: Public
- Traded as: JSE: AIP
- Industry: Health Care, Pharmaceuticals
- Founded: 1890; 136 years ago
- Headquarters: Midrand, South Africa
- Area served: South Africa and selected emerging markets.
- Key people: Andy Hall, CEO; Dorette Neethling, CFO; Nompumelelo Madisa, Chairman
- Products: Pharmaceuticals and Health Care
- Brands: see sections Pharmaceutical brands and Health care brands
- Revenue: ▲ R9.6 billion (2024)
- Operating income: ▲ R1.1 billion (2024)
- Net income: ▲ R814 million (2024)
- Number of employees: 2223 (2021)
- Parent: Bidvest Group
- Website: https://www.adcock.com

Adcock Ingram is a South African pharmaceutical manufacturer listed on the Johannesburg Stock Exchange. Adcock Ingram manufactures and markets healthcare products to both the private and public sectors.

== Company organization ==
In 1995, five divisions comprised the company: critical care, pharmaceuticals, consumer products, wholesale products and an international division; the international division was created to manage the company's first marketing foray outside of South Africa. the international division later disappeared as a transitional unit, leaving the four core units in place.

The company's office in Leicester, England was established in August 1993, with a staff of two people.

Jonathan Louw led the company's pharmaceuticals division from 2002, at which time the company's CEO was Mike Norris. Louw became the firm's CEO in 2006, and Norris retired shortly thereafter. Louw continued as CEO until at least 2013.

== History ==
Adcock Ingram started as a pharmacy in Krugersdorp operating under the name EJ Adcock Pharmacy in 1890. Krugersdorp at the turn of the century was a "bustling pioneer town". In the early 1900s, Hyme Tannenbaum was apprenticed to then owner, Jack Blair. Hyme's brothers Jack, Len and Archie soon followed him into the pharmacy, which they eventually bought. Beginning with this one small pharmacy, the Tannenbaum brothers built a cross-country chain of retail pharmacies, a pharmaceutical and toiletry manufacturing giant and a highly respected South African success story. Adcock Ingram was first listed on the Johannesburg Stock Exchange in 1950, the first pharmaceutical company to list on the exchange.

The company began internationalisation in the 1990s, beginning with the United Kingdom and Australia, the former meant to be a springboard into Europe.

The company was sold to Tiger Brands for R3.4 billion, and became a wholly owned subsidiary in 2000. However, Adcock had been considered a subsidiary of Tiger Brands since 1978. The relationship with Tiger Brands enabled acquisitions in the 1980s such as the Mer-National division of Dow Chemicals Africa; a 40% share of Baxter's Critical Care Division; and acquisitions of Restan Laboratories and the South African interests of Sterling Winthrop. The company's acquisitions continued into the 1990s with Lepping, Laser, Pharmatech, Zurich Pharmaceuticals, Covan Pharmaceuticals and Salters. A merger between Adcock and Premier Pharmaceuticals took place in 1996, which placed Adcock as "the leading supplier of health care products in South Africa." 2001 saw Adcock's acquisition of medical diagnostics firm Steri-Lab, and Robertsons Homecare's acquisition came in 2003.

By 2005, Adcock revenues constituted half of all revenues for parent firm Tiger Brands. However, growing friction between Adcock's portfolio and the strategic direction charted by Tiger led to Tiger's effective termination in investment in Adcock, which eventually led to divestment of Adcock in 2008, which was shortly followed by Adcock's relisting on the JSE exchange as an independent firm.

== Pharmaceutical brands ==
=== Pharmaceuticals ===
- Adco-Alzam
- Adco-Ciprin
- Adco-Dermed
- Adco-Dol
- Adco-Loperamide
- Adco-Napacod
- Adco-Salterpyn Syrup
- Adco-Simvastatin
- An extensive range of generic antiretroviral products
- Alcophyllex
- Aldomet
- Allergex
- Betapyn
- Bron-Cleer
- Cepacol
- Citro Soda
- Clomid
- Compral
- Corenza C
- Covancaine
- Eetless
- Expigen cough syrup
- Gen-Payne
- Iliadin nose spray
- Ladazol
- Lentogesic
- Mayogel
- Medi-Keel A
- Mypaid
- Myprodol
- Nebilet
- Panado, tablet for headache relief
- Panado Syrup
- Prelone
- Propain Forte
- Proscar
- Puritone
- Pynstop
- Saltermox
- Salterpyn
- Spersadex Comp eye drops
- Spersallerg eye drops
- Stopayne
- Teargel
- Tellerge
- Teejel
- Uniphyl
- Urizone
- Veltex
- Vomifene
- Xylotox
- Zocor
- Zyloric

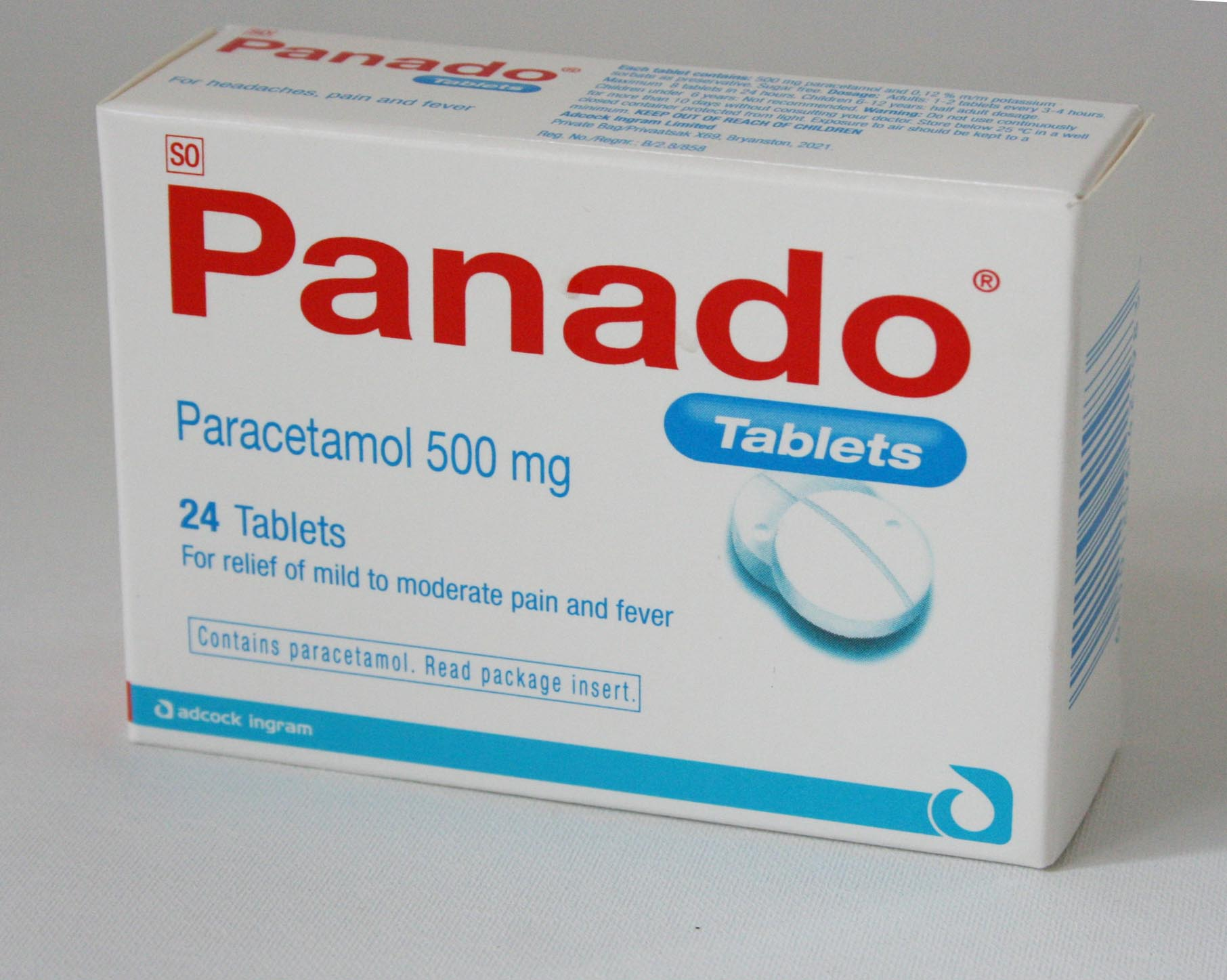
Panado (paracetamol) 500 mg tablets

=== Health supplements ===
- Bioplus, an energy supplement
- Efamol
- Lemplus
- Liviton
- Probiflora, a probiotic
- Vita-Thion

=== Research supplies ===
- cell culture media and supplements

== Health care brands ==
=== Hospital business ===
- Sabax Intravenous Fluids
- Gambro Haemodialysis
- Colleague Infusion Pumps
- Adco - Generic Injectables
- Oliclinomel Nutrition Range
- Fosrenol
- Aranesp
- Fenwal
- One Alpha

=== Consumer brands ===
- Gill (cosmetic, skin and hair care)
- Jet'aime (deodorant)
- Nice to Touch (skin care)

== See also ==
- List of pharmaceutical companies
- List of companies traded on the JSE
- List of companies of South Africa
- Economy of South Africa
