= RCL Foods =

South African consumer goods company

RCL Foods Limited
- Type: Public
- Traded as: JSE: RCL
- ISIN: ZAE000179438
- Industry: Consumer Goods
- Predecessor: Rainbow Chicken Ltd
- Founded: 1960; 66 years ago
- Headquarters: Westville, KwaZulu-Natal, South Africa
- Area served: Southern Africa
- Key people: Paul Cruickshank (CEO); Jannie Durand (Chairman)
- Products: Food
- Revenue: ▲ R34.9 billion (2022)
- Operating income: ▲ R1.1 billion (2022)
- Net income: ▲ R751.8 million (2022)
- Owner: Remgro (77.7%)
- Number of employees: 20,479 (2015)
- Website: rclfoods.com

RCL Foods Limited is a South African consumer goods and milling company.

Founded in 1960 as Rainbow Chicken Ltd, the company has its headquarters in Westville near Durban, and employs over 20,000 people.

RCL is 77.7% owned by the South African investment firm Remgro. In 2017, the company announced it would be cutting its workforce by 1,350 people due to increased chicken imports into South Africa from Europe and the US following the signing of trade agreements with them.

== Foodcorp ==
In 2012, RCL bought a controlling 64.2% stake in the South African packaged foods company Foodcorp for R1.037 billion. In July 2013, RCL completed its buyout of Foodcorp by acquiring a final 23.9% stake for R393 million increasing its total holding in the company to 88.1%. Foodcorp was created following the merger between Kanhym and Fedfood in 1992 making it one of South Africa's largest food companies.

=== 2007 Foodcorp price fixing ===
In December 2012, Foodcorp voluntarily paid an R88 million fine to the South African Competition Commission for colluding with other bread producers to raise the price of bread by between 30c and 35c per loaf between 1999 and 2007. This fine reflected roughly 10% of Foodcorp's 2010 turnover in bread sales.

According to the commission, South Africa's four largest milling companies collectively controlling over 90 percent of the local flour market were involved in colluding with each other. The four firms (Foodcorp, Tiger Brands, Pioneer Foods and Premier Foods) facilitated their pricing activities through secret meetings and telephone calls between employees of these firms at various venues, including churches, stadiums and hotels. The commission found that these price-fixing activities had a negative effect on both consumers as a whole as well as preventing smaller bakeries from being effective competitors.
