= Devon (sausage) =

Manufactured meat product

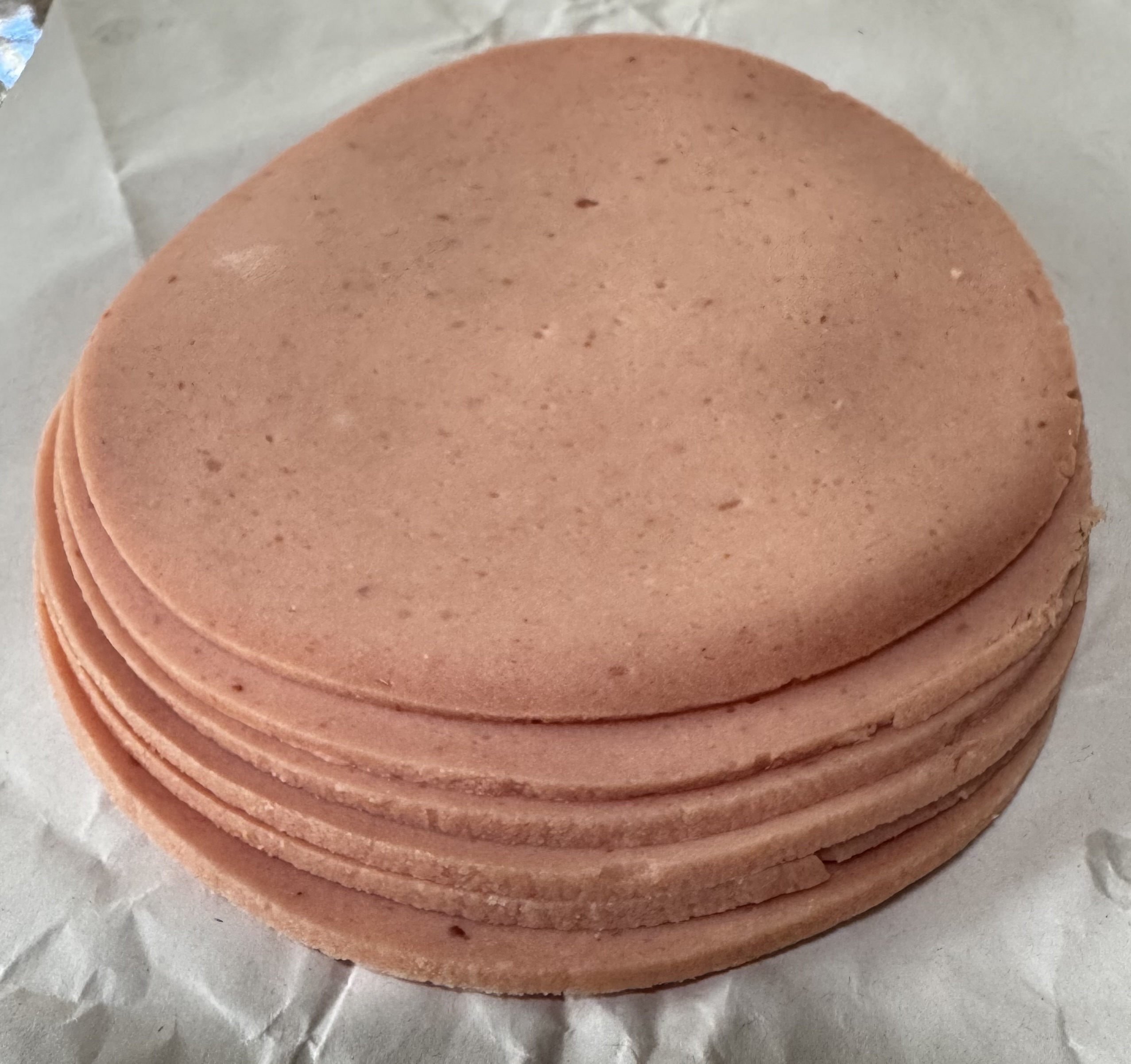
- Slices of Devon
- Alternative names: Fritz, Strasburg, Belgium, Windsor, Polony, Luncheon
- Type: Sausage
- Course: Main course
- Place of origin: Australia
- Serving temperature: Cold
- Main ingredients: Pork meat
- Variations: Smiley fritz
- Food energy (per serving): 45 to 70 per standard 30 gram slice, or 145 to 200 per 100 grams
- Similar dishes: Bologna sausage

Devon (Note: also known as Fritz, Strasburg, Belgium, Windsor, Polony, Luncheon) (/ˈdɛvən/ DEV-ən) is a type of manufactured meat product sold in Australia and New Zealand.

Devon is commonly sold from brands like Primo, Dandy (owned by JBS), Mayfair (owned by JBS), Hans, and others such as generic supermarket brands.

== Overview ==
Typical commercial preparations list the major ingredient as "meat including pork". It is usually composed of several types of pork, basic spices, and a binder.

It is considered to be a cheap meat product and is sold in the deli section of supermarkets.

It is usually served in a sandwich, often with tomato sauce, and can also be fried in slices.

Devon would be classed as "luncheon meat" in the UK or a "cold cut" in the US.

Devon can also be brought in a roll or knob, usually found in supermarket refrigerators.

== Terminology ==
The product is known by a variety of names in different regions of Australia and New Zealand:

- "Luncheon" - New Zealand
- "Belgium" - Tasmania,
- "Polony" - Western Australia
- "Devon" - New South Wales, Tasmania, the Australian Capital Territory, most of Queensland, and parts of Victoria
- "Strasburg" or "Straz" - Parts of Victoria
- "Windsor" - Parts of Queensland
- "Fritz" - South Australia

Originally known in some parts of Australia as "German sausage", this name fell out of favour during World War I when Australia was at war with Germany. 'Veal German' is another facsimile. It is similar in appearance and taste to the bologna sausage and the cooked pork sausage known in Australia as Berliner.

Though similar in usage and appearance, South Australians maintain that devon is not in fact related to the South Australian "bung fritz", which is manufactured using a process and recipe entirely unique to South Australia, particularly in the use of the sheep's appendix (known as the bung, where bung fritz gets the name).

It may be referred to as Strass, from the word Strassburg, though this term is usually associated with another style of processed meat roll characterised by a waxy red 'skin' and fat-mottled, chunkier texture.

== See also ==
- Australian cuisine
