= Veterinary equivalency =

Veterinary equivalency is the mutual recognition by two or more countries that each party's safety and sanitation standards for animal products, even where not identical, provide an equivalent level of protection to public and animal health. Aimed at facilitating trade, the practical effect of veterinary equivalency is that each country's individual products and facilities will not have to submit to the separate standards of importing countries and to cumbersome and costly inspections by foreign reviewers.

Veterinary equivalency has been a contentious issue for the United States and European Union (EU). The two parties in 1997 agreed in principle to an agreement recognizing each other's standards, but did not sign the agreement until July 1999 due to a series of unresolved technical disputes. Some parts of this agreement remained in dispute in 2002.
