= Bologna sausage =

American sausage

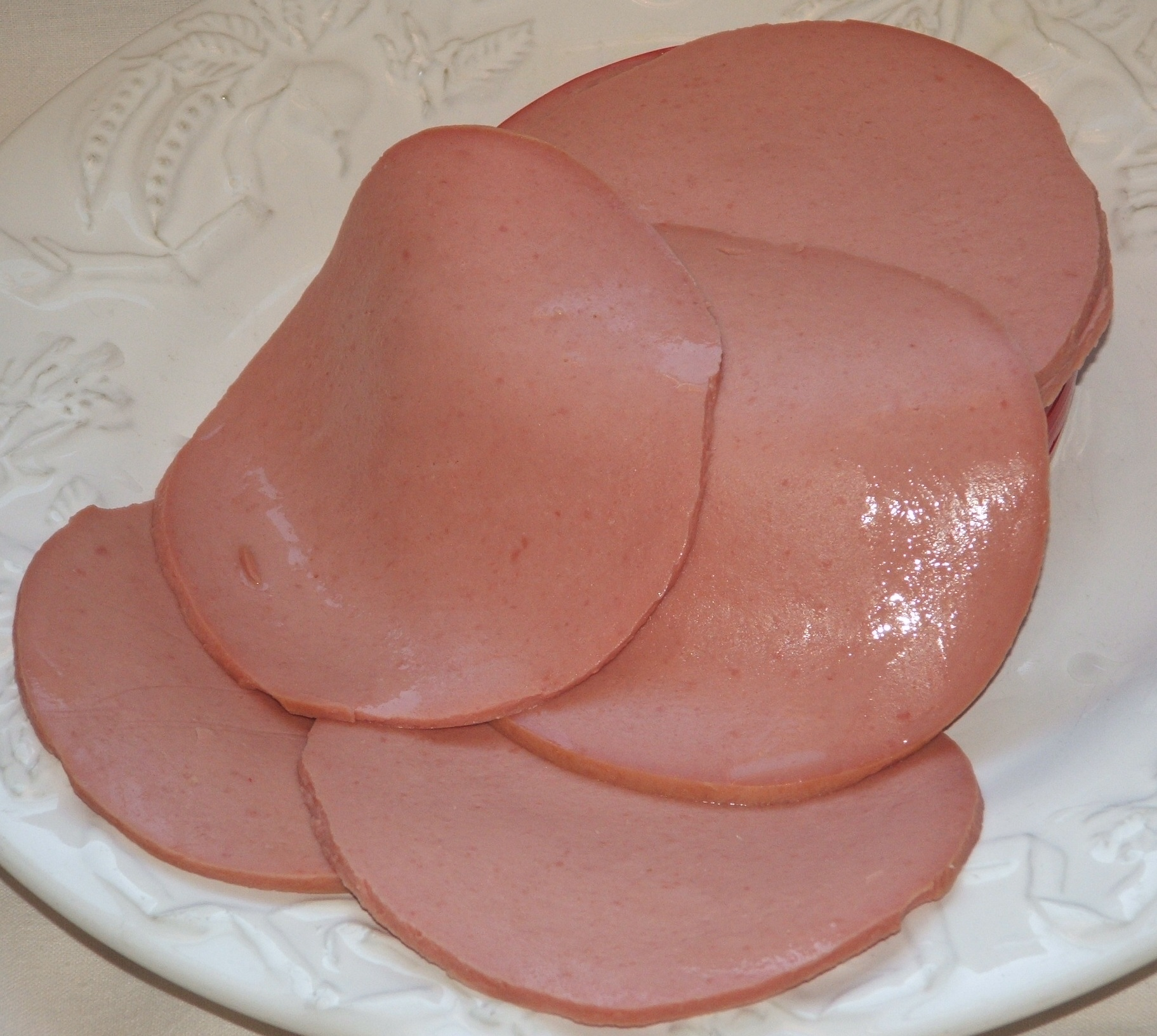
- Sliced bologna
- Alternative names: Baloney
- Type: Sausage
- Place of origin: United States
- Serving temperature: Cold
- Main ingredients: Pork meat, chicken, turkey, and beef
- Variations: Lebanon bologna, Ring bologna, Polony
- Food energy (per serving): 70 to 95 kcal (290 to 400 kJ)
- Similar dishes: Devon

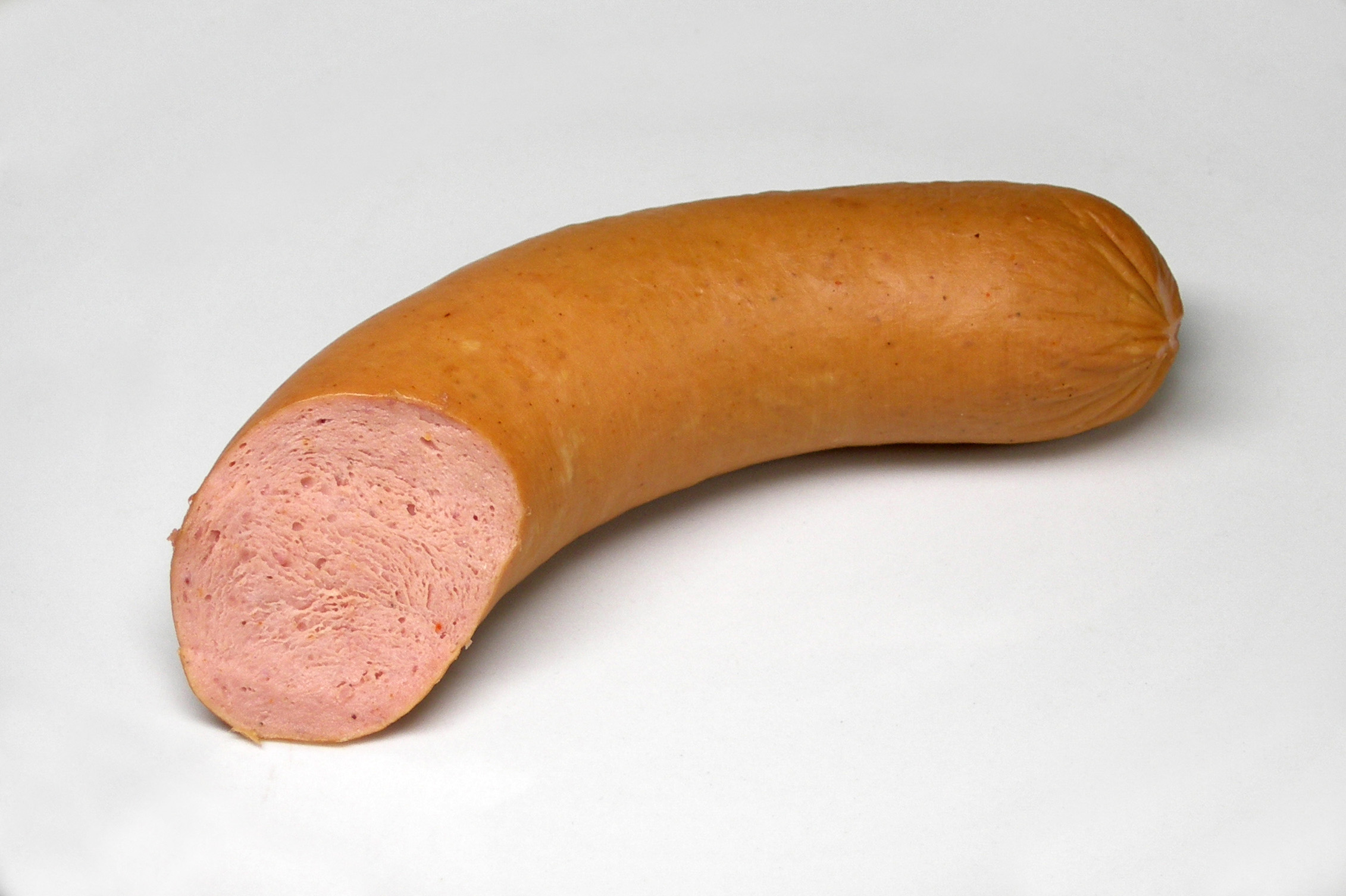
Bologna in sausage form

Bologna sausage, informally Baloney (/bə.ˈloʊ.ni/, bə-LOH-nee), is an American cooked sausage. It derives from Italian mortadella Bologna PGI, a variety of mortadella, a large salume. Its seasonings include black pepper, nutmeg, allspice, celery seed, coriander, and myrtle berries.

Regional variants of mortadella Bologna include Parizer (Parisian sausage) in Hungary, Romania, and the countries of the former Yugoslavia; Polony in Zimbabwe, Zambia, South Africa and Western Australia; Devon in most states of Australia; and Fritz in South Australia.

In North America, a simple and popular use is in the bologna sandwich. In the Southern United States, a bologna cake exists which is bologna slices layered with seasoned cream cheese to make the appearance of a cake.

== Variations ==
Aside from pork, bologna can be made out of chicken, turkey, beef, venison, a combination of meats or soy protein.

=== US bologna ===
US federal government regulations require American bologna to be finely ground. "Frankfurter, frank, furter, hotdog, weiner, vienna, bologna, garlic bologna, knockwurst, and similar products" all use the same standard of identity defined in 9 CFR 319.180. They belong to the category of cooked sausages.

It is historically and geographically associated with the German-American immigrant community. There can be significant variation among regional styles: Northern Ohioans prefer coarser-ground straight German-style bolognas, while Southern Ohioans prefer the finer-ground ring bologna.

==== Rag bologna ====
Rag bologna is a long stick, or "chub", of high-fat bologna originating in West Tennessee and its surrounding area, unavailable elsewhere. It is traditionally sold wrapped in a cloth rag, and has a higher content of filler than that of regular bologna. Milk solids, flour, cereal, and spices are added during processing, and the roll of bologna is bathed in lactic acid before being coated in paraffin wax. It is generally eaten on white bread with mustard and pickles, but is also a staple of family gatherings, where thick slices are smoked and barbecued along with other meats. In Newfoundland and Atlantic Canada, a type of rag bologna referred to as "wax" bologna is sliced thickly and fried, which is referred to as "Newfie steak".

==== Ring bologna ====
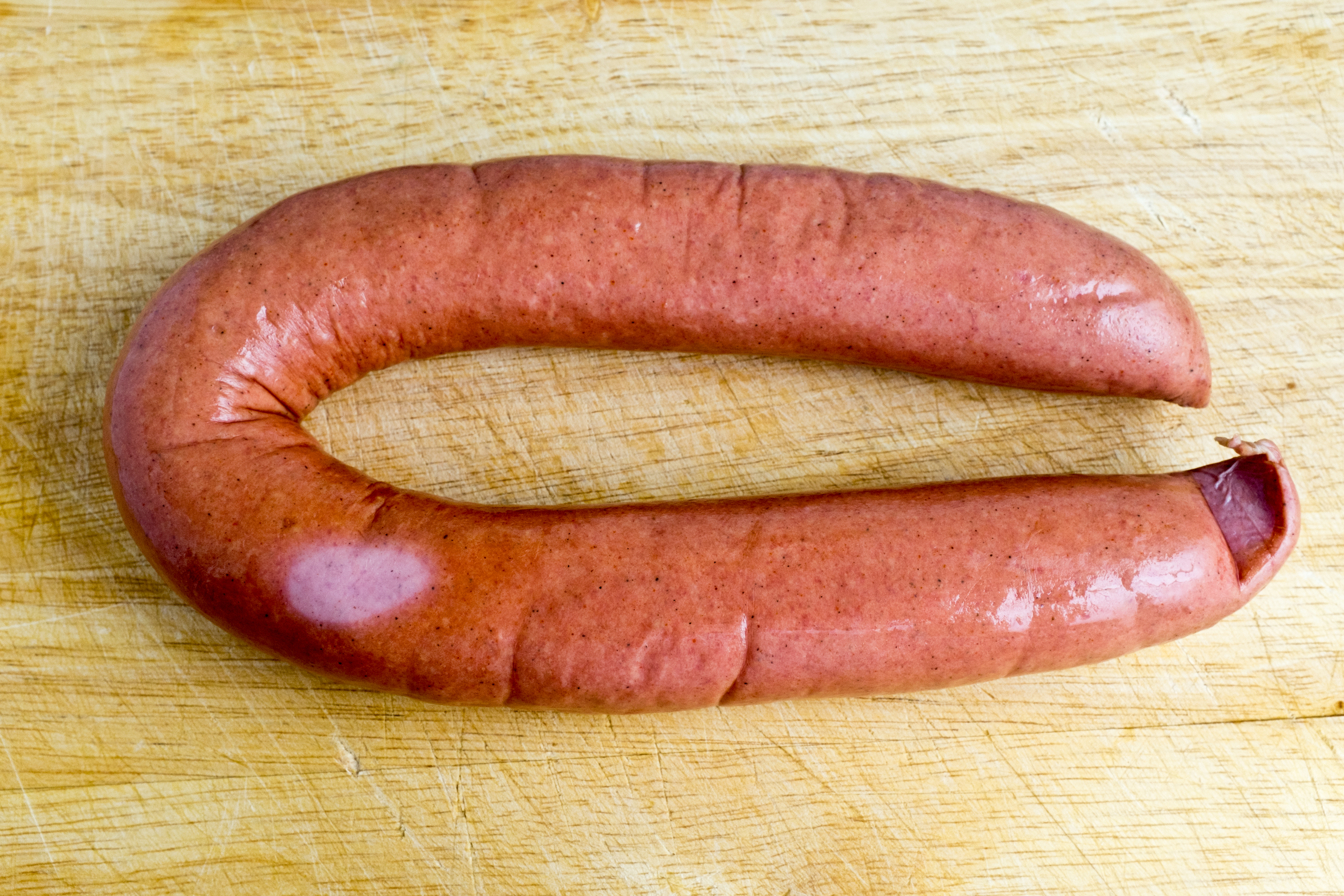
Ring bologna

Ring bologna is much smaller in diameter than standard bologna. It is better suited for slicing and serving on crackers, either as a snack or hors d'oeuvre. It is generally sold as an entire link rather than sliced. The link is arranged as a semicircle or "ring" when prepared for sale (hence the name). Pickled bologna is usually made from ring bologna soaked in vinegar and typical pickling spices.

=== Polony ===
In England, Ireland and also Western Australia, a polony is a finely ground pork-and-beef sausage. The name, likely derived from "Bologna", has been in use since the 17th century. The modern product is usually cooked in a red or orange skin and is served as cold slices. In England polony can also be used for the pork sausage instead of bologna.

In Scotland, polony is a finely ground seasoned cured pork sausage often eaten in a roll, most commonly with a fried egg, or as part of a full breakfast. It is cooked in a red skin, served in slices by butcher shops, and fried or grilled before eating. It is particularly popular in Dundee and the north east of Scotland generally.

In New Zealand, polony is a type of cocktail sausage with pink or red artificially-coloured skin similar to, but much smaller than, a saveloy. Miniature polonies in New Zealand are called "Cheerios" and often are eaten boiled with tomato sauce. In New Zealand, polony is also called "Luncheon Sausage" or simply "Luncheon".

South African polony is similar to bologna in constitution and appearance, and is typically inexpensive. Large-diameter (artificially coloured) pink polonies are called "French polony", with thinner rolls referred to simply as "polony". Garlic polony is also widely available.

In 2018, a South African factory that produced polony and other processed meats was associated with a listeriosis outbreak that killed approximately 216 people and sickened a further thousand.

=== Vegetarian bologna ===
Various vegetarian and vegan versions of bologna are available. A typical UK recipe uses soy and wheat protein in place of lean meat and palm oil instead of fat together with starch, carrageenan, and flavorings. It can be eaten cold or cooked in the same ways as traditional bologna.

== See also ==
- Lebanon bologna
