= À la zingara =

Sauce in French cuisine

- Type: Condiment
- Main ingredients: ham, tongue, mushrooms and truffles combined with tomato sauce, tarragon and sometimes madeira

In French cuisine, à la zingara (lit. "gypsy style"), sometimes spelled as à la singara, is a garnish or sauce consisting of chopped ham, tongue, mushrooms and truffles combined with tomato sauce, tarragon and sometimes madeira. Additional ingredients may include white wine, cayenne pepper, lemon juice and orange rind. The sauce is prepared by cooking the ingredients until the mixture reduces and thickens. This garnish is served with meat such as veal, poultry and sometimes eggs.

Gypsy sauce (German: Zigeunersauce) may have originated from à la zingara. Gypsy sauce is prepared using many of the same ingredients as à la zingara. Simpler versions of gypsy sauce, including commercial varieties, typically use a lesser amount of ingredients, such as tomato paste, Hungarian paprika, bell peppers and sometimes onion.

== À la zingara ==
À la zingara has sometimes been referred to as singara and zingara sauce. Conversely, à la zingara has also been referred to as separate from zingara sauce, such as in the 2009 book Dictionary of Food authored by Charles Sinclair and published by Bloomsbury Publishing, (Note: The Dictionary of Food was also published by A & C Black in 2005.) which has separate entries for à la zingara and zingara sauce, referring to à la zingara as "France In the gypsy style, i.e. with ham, tongue, mushrooms and tomatoes" and zingara sauce as "France A sauce for veal and poultry made to a variety of recipes and little used."

An 1869 recipe for blonde veal cutlets with ham à la zingara uses espagnole sauce and ham. The espagnole sauce is cooked with the veal, and then later the fat is skimmed from the sauce, which is then run through a sieve, after which it is served with the dish. An 1858 recipe for veal cutlets à la zingara is similar, with the addition of mushrooms and truffles in the center of the dish surrounding the veal and ham. After the meats are cooked and plated, The espagnole sauce is cooked in the pan the veal was cooked in, lemon juice and cayenne pepper are added, and then the sauce is poured over the cutlets.

== Gypsy sauce ==
Gypsy sauce is a sauce or demi-glace sauce used as an ingredient in dishes and as a condiment. The term “Zigeuner” has been used in Germany for over a century regarding the sauce. Some companies mass-produce it, including Remia, Verstegen and Unilever. Some controversy occurred in 2013 regarding use of the word "gypsy" on the labels of commercial varieties of the sauce and at German public building cafeterias.

=== Etymology ===
The term Zigeuner has been used for over 100 years in Germany in reference to the sauce. This term was used in the 1903 book Le guide culinaire written by Auguste Escoffier.

=== History ===
Gypsy sauce is used in Austrian, French and German cuisine.

=== Preparation ===
Contemporary gypsy sauce is typically prepared using tomato paste, Hungarian paprika, bell peppers and sometimes onion. It may be prepared as a spicy-hot sauce. Canned whole or crushed tomatoes are sometimes used. Additional ingredients used in its preparation include onion, garlic, chicken broth, milk, a sweetener such as sugar or honey, salt and pepper.

Another preparation of the sauce includes tomato slices or tomato purée, onions, smoked tongue, ham, mushrooms, truffles, white wine or Madeira wine, butter, paprika and pepper, which is very similar to the preparation of à la zingara. The simpler preparation of the sauce may have originated from the more complex à la zingara sauce. (Note: "Die mit Paprika und Tomaten angerührte Zigeunersoße der fast foodindustrie unterscheidet sich erheblich von den Schlemmereien à la zingara vergangener Zeiten, bei denen zu dieser Zubereitungsart Trüffeln gehörten." (in German)) (Note: "Zingara zigeunersauce: demi-glace mit Tomatenpüree Madeirawein, Schinkenstreifen, Champignons, Trüffeln and Pökelzunge" (in German))

=== Production ===
Gypsy sauce is commercially mass-produced by some companies, such as Remia, Verstegen and Unilever, which is marketed under Unilever's Knorr brand name.

=== Use in dishes ===
Gypsy sauce is used in the preparation of Zigeunerschnitzel, a German schnitzel dish.

=== Name controversy ===
In August 2013, a group representing Romani and Sinti peoples called for commercial varieties of the sauce to be renamed, stating that use of the word gypsy is offensive and discriminatory, and has negative connotations. The group requested that five German food companies rename the sauce, suggesting using the name "spicy sauce" or another similar name. Authorities in Hanover, Germany, issued an internal memo in October 2013 informing city staffers that they should avoid using the term to describe a type of schnitzel served in the cafeterias of city-run public buildings, instead calling it "Balkan-style" or "Budapest-style". During this time, food manufacturers essentially opposed renaming the commercial brands of the sauce. The German Association of Culinary Foodstuffs Manufacturers stated through a spokesperson that the sauce has significant brand recognition under this name, and that the word gypsy has been used for over 100 years to represent the sauce. However, in August 2020, companies such as Knorr replaced the name with "Hungarian-style paprika sauce", citing the recent debates about racism, spurred by the George Floyd protests.

== See also ==
- List of condiments
- List of sauces
