= Schnitzel =

Breaded, fried flat piece of meat

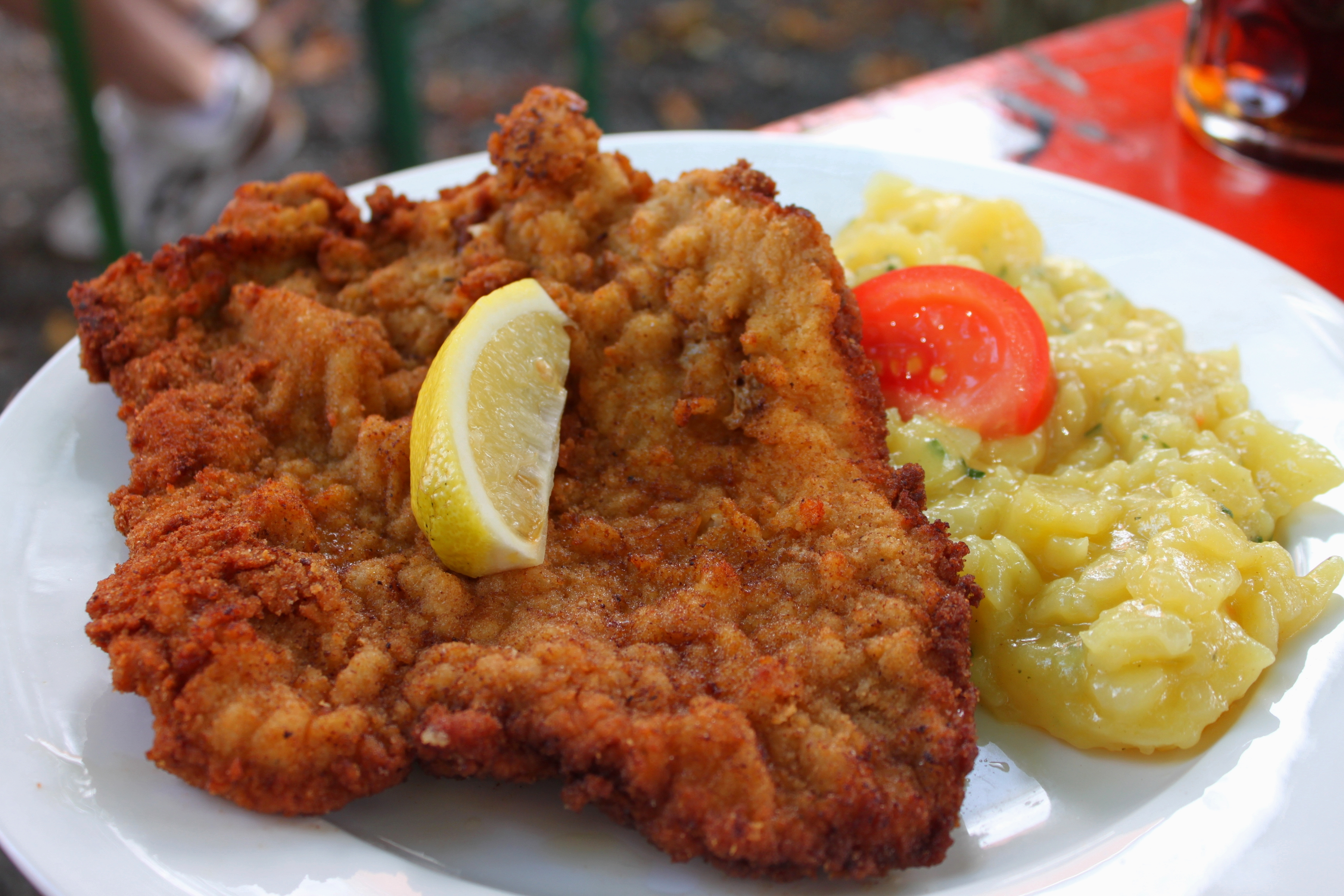
- Type: Cutlet
- Course: Main course
- Place of origin: Austria
- Region or state: Central Europe
- Invented: 19th century
- Serving temperature: 63°C (145°F)
- Main ingredients: Meat
- Ingredients generally used: Breading; Fat
- Variations: List

Schnitzel (German: [ˈʃnɪt͡sl̩]) is a thin slice of meat. The meat is usually thinned by pounding with a meat tenderizer. Most commonly, the meat is breaded before frying. Breaded schnitzel is popular in many countries and is made using veal, pork, chicken, mutton, beef, or turkey. Schnitzel originated as Wiener schnitzel and is very similar to other breaded meat dishes.

== Etymology ==
The German word das Schnitzel (Middle High German: snitzel) is a diminutive of sniz, 'slice'. The name Wiener Schnitzel is first attested in 1845.

Schnitzel is sometimes mispronounced or misspelled as "Snitzel" or "Snitchel".

== Wiener schnitzel ==
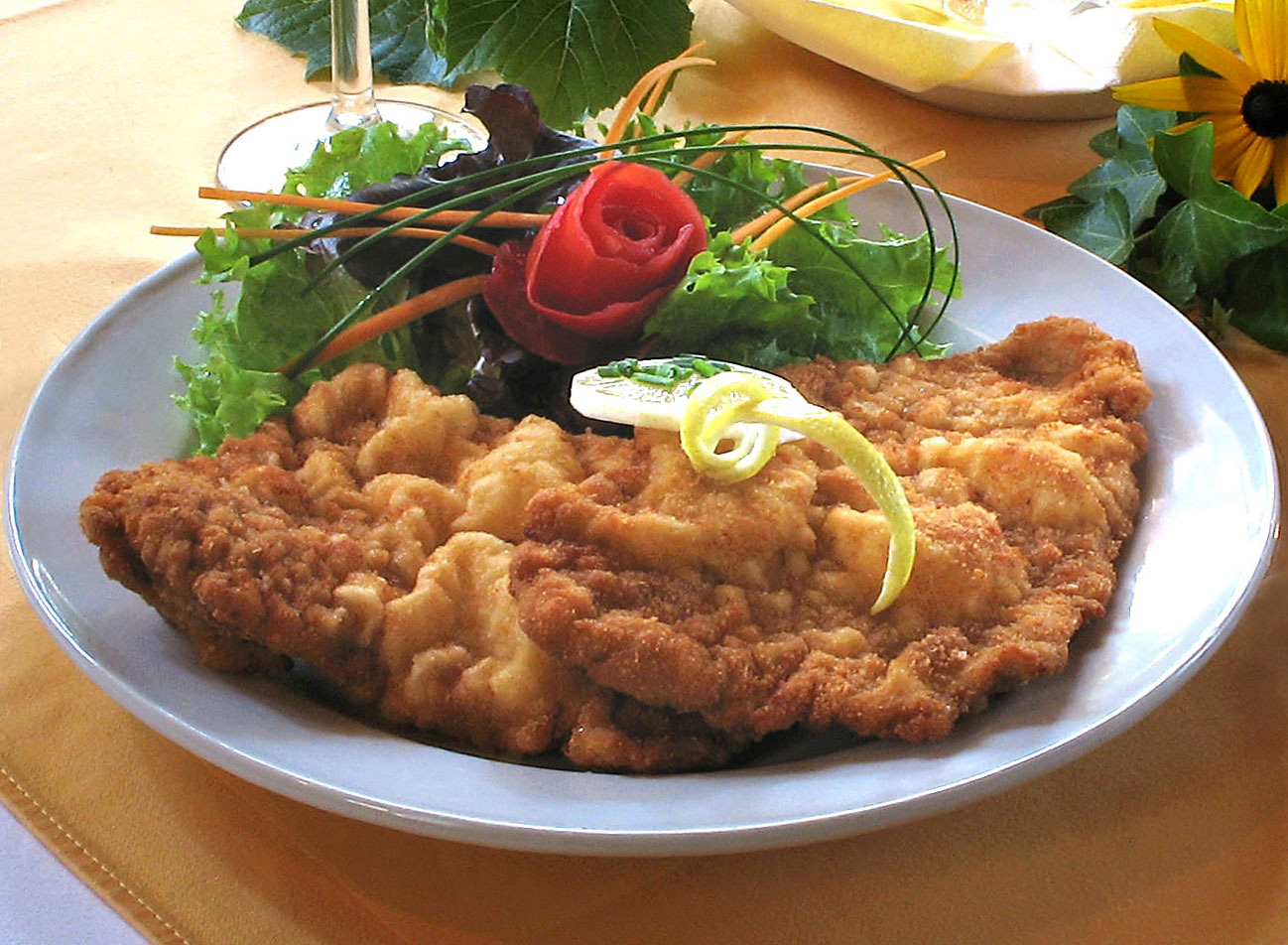
Wiener Schnitzel, a traditional Austrian dish

Wiener schnitzel is a popular Viennese dish made of veal and traditionally garnished with a slice of lemon and either potato salad or potatoes with parsley and butter.

In Austria and Germany, Wiener Schnitzel must be made of veal. When other meats are used, it can be called Wiener Schnitzel vom Schwein/Pute/Huhn ("Viennese schnitzel of pig/turkey/chicken") or Schnitzel (nach) Wiener Art ("Schnitzel Viennese style").

== Schnitzels worldwide ==
The English term schnitzel means in general all types of breaded, fried flat pieces of meat. Due to the similarity between schnitzel and escalope, in many of the countries listed below, people sometimes refer to schnitzels as escalope, and vice versa.

=== Africa ===
==== Egypt ====
In Egypt, there are two dishes similar to schnitzel, one made with chicken and the other with veal. When chicken is used, it is called frakh pané (فراخ بانيه, lit. "chicken pané", where pané is from the French for "breaded", influenced by French "Escalope panée") and is also popular with French fries, in sandwiches, or eaten alone as an appetizer. Using veal, it is called boftik (بفتيك, from the French for bifteck).

==== Namibia ====
Schnitzel, both chicken and pork, is common in Namibia due to the country's German colonial history. A majority of the restaurants in Windhoek, Walvis Bay, and Swakopmund offer it on their menus, often topped with a fried egg and accompanied by potato salad. It is often eaten in a Brötchen (German sandwich roll) with tomatoes, cheese, and other dressing.

==== South Africa ====
Schnitzel is popular in South Africa, due to the European settlement during the colonial era. Chicken schnitzels and cordon bleu schnitzels are a common item on most restaurant and hospital menus, and in recent years, beef and pork schnitzels have also become widely available.

=== Asia ===
==== Japan ====
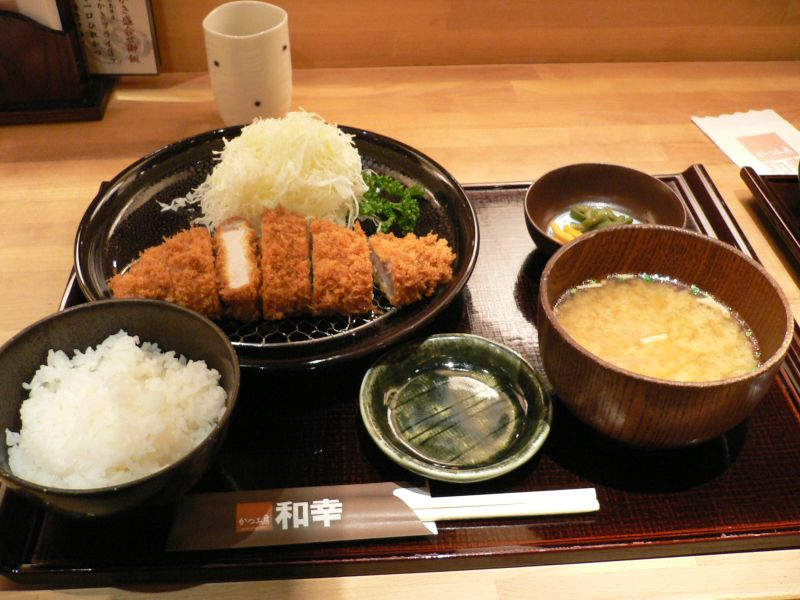
Tonkatsu

Japanese tonkatsu (豚カツ, lit. "pork cutlet") consists of a flattened pork loin, lightly seasoned, coated in flour, dipped in beaten egg, coated with panko crumbs and deep-fried. Tonkatsu is often served as an accompaniment to ramen or udon or featured with curry and rice.

Pork tonkatsu was invented in Japan in 1899 at the Rengatei restaurant in Tokyo. It was originally considered a type of yōshoku—Japanese versions of European cuisine invented in the late 19th and early 20th centuries—and was called katsuretsu (cutlet) or simply katsu. Variations include the use of pork fillet (hirekatsu), chicken (chicken katsu), beef (gyūkatsu), ham (hamukatsu) and minced meat (menchi-katsu).

==== Korea ====
Korean dongaseu came from Japan in the 1930s, and newspapers explained how to make it. In the 1960s, as more restaurants started selling dongaseu, it changed to suit Korean tastes. In Korean cuisine, pork (돈가스; donkaseu, from Japanese tonkatsu), chicken (치킨가스; chikinkaseu), and beef (비프가스; bipkaseu) cutlets are popular. The most common types of donkaseu are "kyeongyangsik" (경양식; Western-style) and "ilbonsik"(일본식; Japanese-style).

=== Europe ===
==== Austria ====
Wiener schnitzel, a very thin, breaded and pan-fried cutlet made from veal, is one of the best-known specialities of Viennese cuisine, and is one of the national dishes of Austria. A breaded schnitzel with sauce is considered unacceptable in Austrian culture.

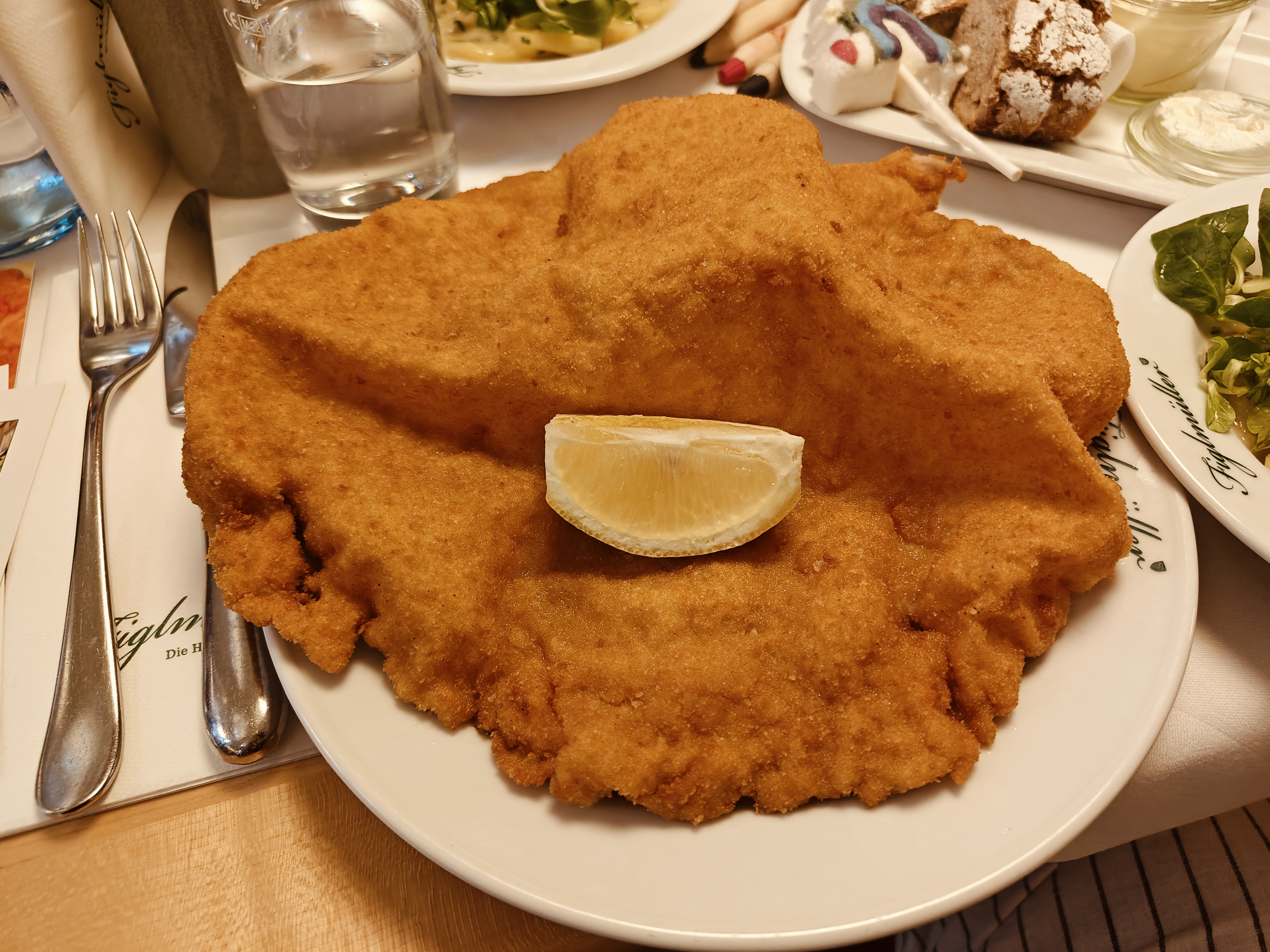
The Viennese-style schnitzel from pork at the Figlmuller restaurant in Vienna

Common variations are made with pork or turkey instead of veal, for one because it is cheaper than veal. Austrian law requires that Wiener Schnitzel is made of veal. A schnitzel made of pork can be called Wiener Schnitzel vom Schwein ('Wiener schnitzel from pork') or Schnitzel Wiener Art ('Viennese style schnitzel').

Popular unbreaded variants in Austria are:

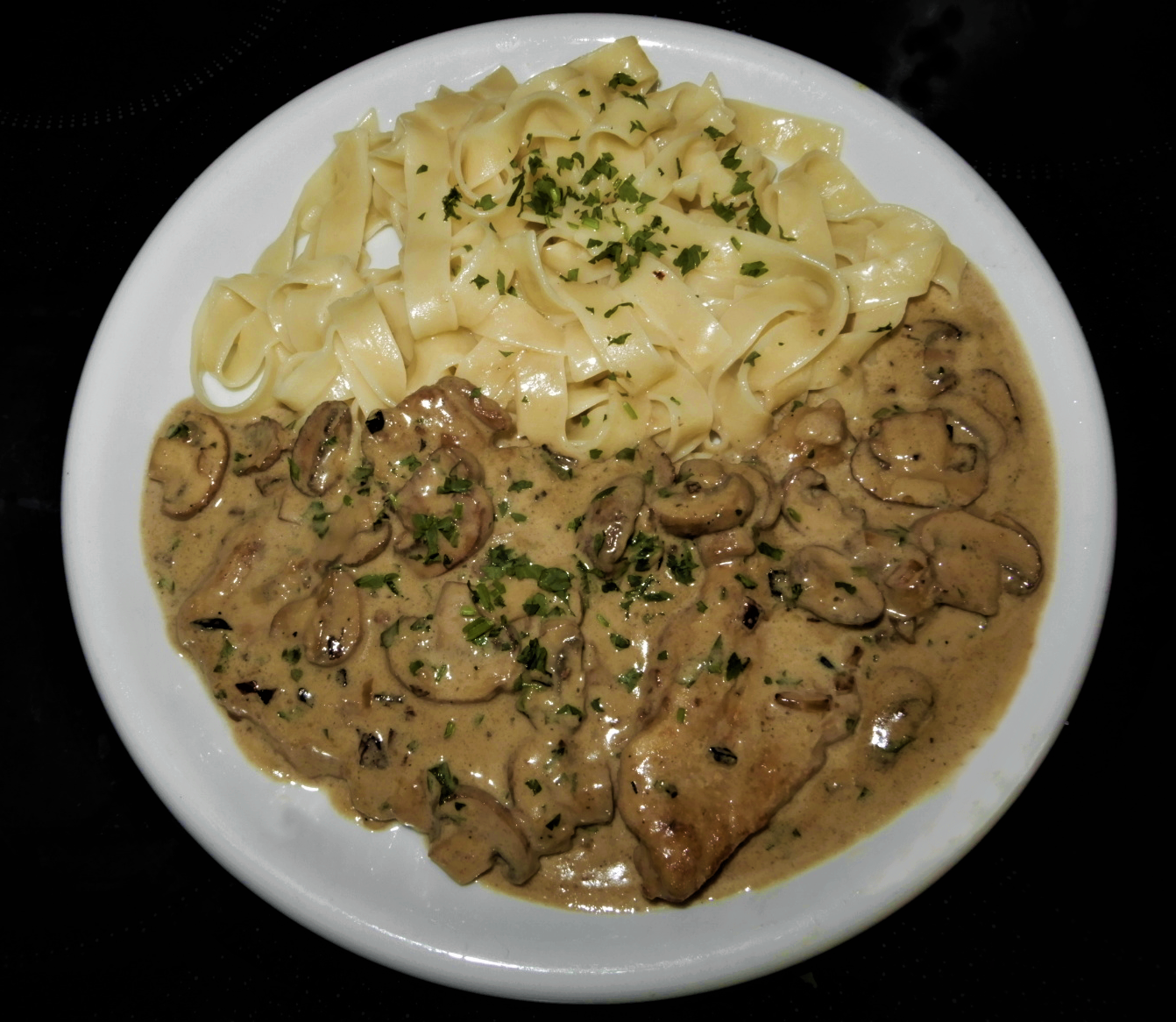
Jägerschnitzel with fettucine

- Jägerschnitzel ('hunter's schnitzel') is a schnitzel with mushroom sauce.
- Rahmschnitzel ('cream schnitzel') is a schnitzel with a cream sauce, often containing some mushrooms.
- Zigeunerschnitzel ('Gypsy schnitzel') is a schnitzel with a zigeuner sauce containing tomato, bell peppers, and onion slices.

==== Bosnia and Herzegovina ====
In Bosnia and Herzegovina, the dish is called bečka šnicla or bečki odrezak (bečki = "Viennese"; šnicla = transliteration of German Schnitzel) and is made of veal or beef and usually served with mashed potatoes. Common garnishes include a slice of lemon or some lettuce.

==== Bulgaria ====
Called шницел (shnitsel), it is made from ground veal, formed as a thin patty, seasoned with salt and black pepper, then breaded and fried. The dish usually is served with a choice of mashed or roasted potatoes, French fries, or simply a tomato salad. It is common at truck stops, and it is usually ordered à la carte, coming with a lemon wedge, but one can also find it in the frozen sections in supermarkets or premade and ready to cook.

==== Croatia ====
In Croatian, the dish is called bečki odrezak (or šnicl) (bečki = "Viennese"; šnicl = transliteration of German Schnitzel) and it is made of veal (sometimes substituted with cheaper pork) and served with French fries or potato salad and a slice of lemon. A similar dish is called zagrebački odrezak (šnicl) (a variation on cordon bleu). Baron Trenck's steak is veal or pork stuffed with Slavonian ham, boiled eggs and ajvar, stewed on red onion with mushroom sauce. Baron Trenk's Steak is a stuffed meat dish associated with the cuisine of Slavonia, a region of eastern Croatia. The dish is named after Franz von der Trenck, an 18th-century military commander whose estates and historical legacy are connected with Slavonia.

==== Czechia ====
Schnitzel is also very popular in the Czech Republic, where it is known as a smažený řízek or just řízek, and is made of pork, chicken, or veal. It is often served with fries, fried, boiled or mashed potatoes or potato salad. It also used to be and to some degree still is a typical packed lunch for day trips, when it was consumed with bread (often between two slices of bread with vegetables and dressing as a sandwich).

==== Denmark ====
In Denmark, the dish is called skinkeschnitzel when made of pork and wienerschnitzel when made of veal, and is usually served with fried potatoes, gravy, green or snow peas, and a "boy" (dreng in Danish) consisting of a lemon slice topped with capers, horseradish, and a slice of anchovy.

==== Estonia ====
In Estonia, schnitzels (šnitsel) are commonly made with pork. There also exists a schnitzel made from cheese that has been breaded and fried, typically served with salad.

==== Finland ====
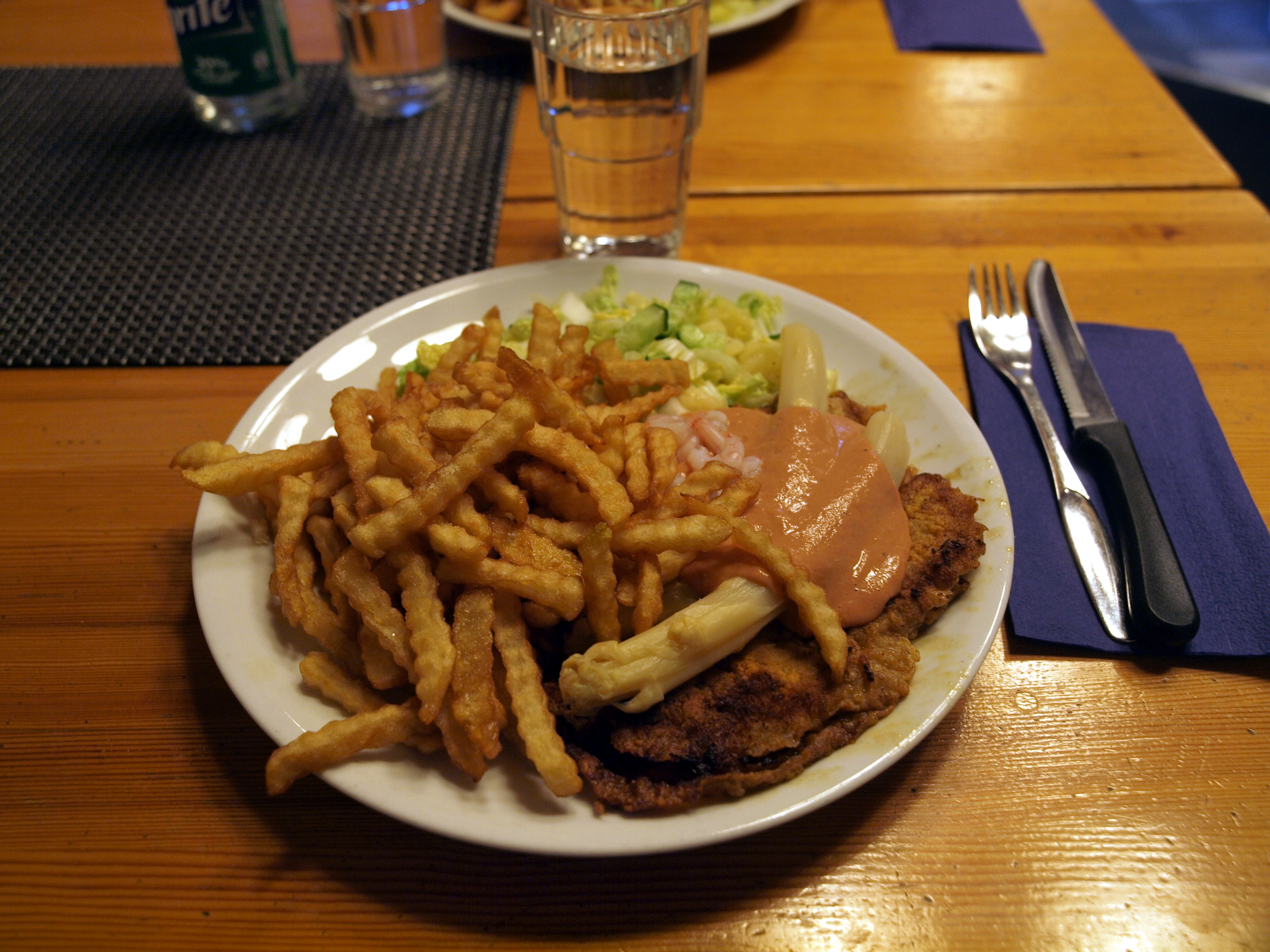
Oskarinleike with fries

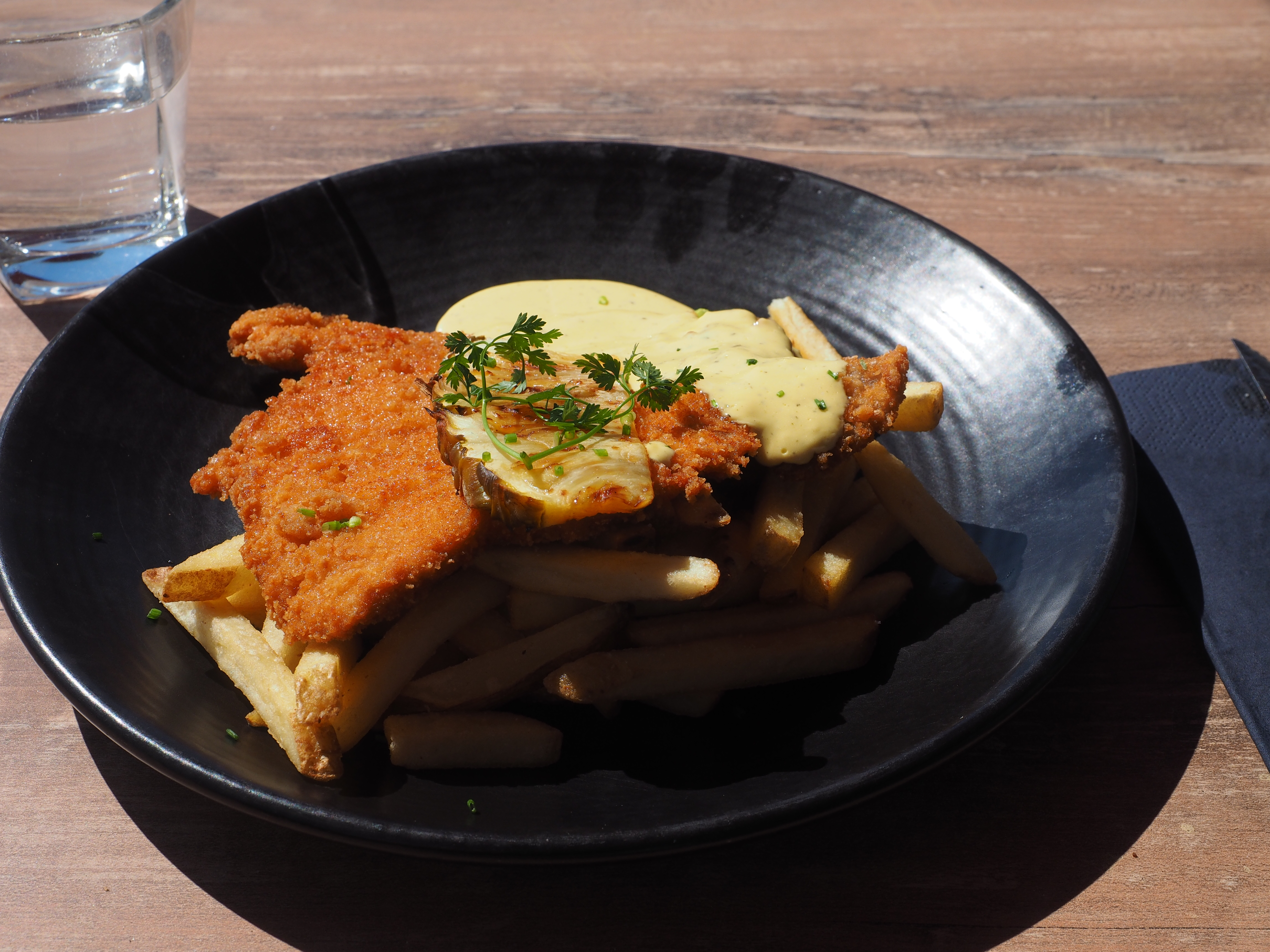
Havaijinleike with fries

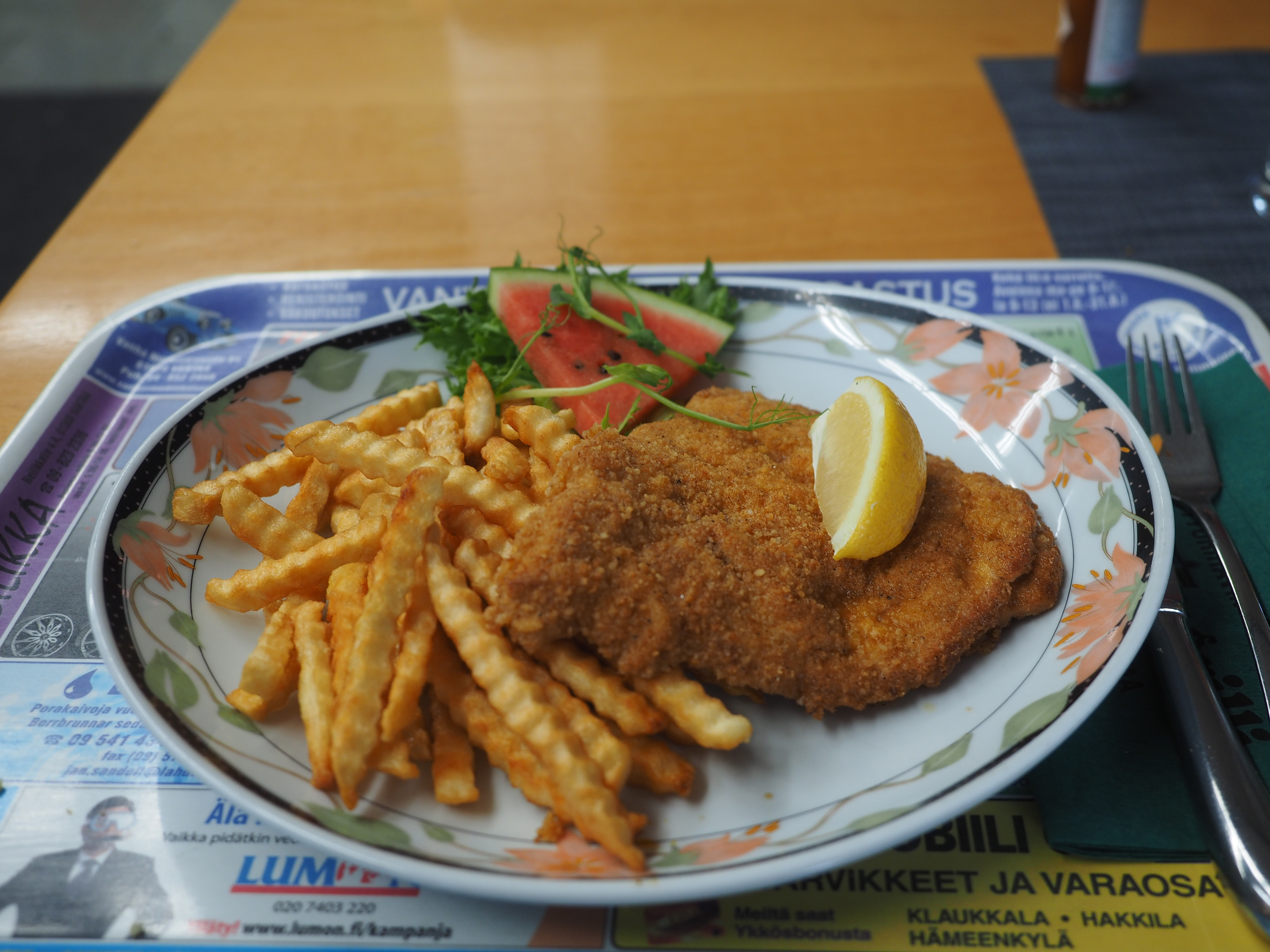
Sveitsinleike with fries

In Finland, the dish called Wieninleike ("Viennese cutlet"), is almost always made of pork, breaded and fried like the original. It is usually served with French fries, potato mash, or wedge potatoes. A slice of lemon, a slice of anchovy, and a few capers are placed on top of the cutlet. Usually, the dish includes a small amount of salad made from fresh vegetables. The dish was popular between the end of the Second World War and the 1990s, when it could be found in most low-end restaurants in Finland. In past decades, it has been overtaken in popularity by fast food.

Wieninleike and its variations remain a staple of menus in many non-ethnic or fine dining restaurants in Finland. Lunch restaurants, highway rest stops and restaurants attached to gas stations are most prominently associated with this type of menu in Finland.

- Wieninleike ("Viennese cutlet") served typically with slice of lemon, anchovy, and caper
- Floridanleike ("Floridian cutlet") served with fried peach and served with Béarnaise sauce
- Havaijinleike ("Hawaiian cutlet") served with fried pineapple
- Holsteininleike ("Holstein cutlet") served with egg, anchovy, and caper
- Metsästäjänleike ("hunter's cutlet") served with mushroom sauce
- Oskarinleike ("Oscar's cutlet") served with choron-sauce, shrimps or lobster, and asparagus
- Oopperaleike ("opera cutlet") served with fried egg
- Sveitsinleike ("Swiss cutlet") is filled with smoked ham and Emmentaler cheese
- Talonpojanleike ("Peasant's cutlet") served with fried egg and bacon

Typically the dishes above are prepared from pork.

==== France ====
Pariser schnitzel is similar to Wiener schnitzel but is floured and fried in an egg batter instead of using breadcrumbs.

Côtelette Menon or Côtelette révolution is made of veal and breaded.

==== Germany ====
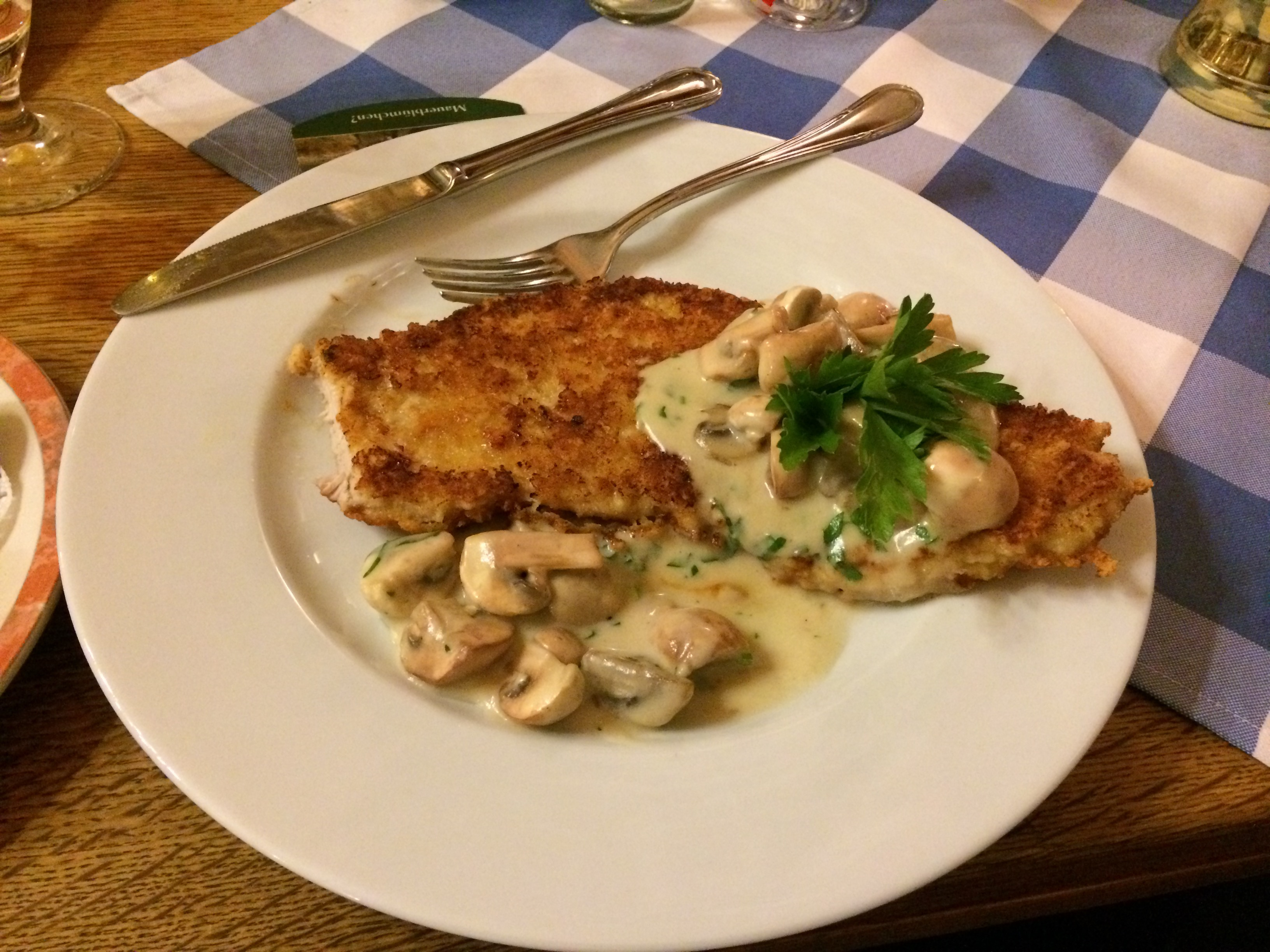
Jägerschnitzel as served at a German restaurant

In Germany, the term Schnitzel means cutlets in general, not just breaded, fried ones.

- Schnitzel Wiener Art ('Viennese style schnitzel') is a pounded, breaded, and fried cutlet, more often made of pork than of veal. Restaurants mostly serve it with a slice of lemon and French fries.
- Jägerschnitzel ('hunter's schnitzel') is a schnitzel with mushroom sauce. An East German variant of Jägerschnitzel is made of Jagdwurst sausage and without sauce.
- Zigeunerschnitzel ('Gypsy schnitzel') is a schnitzel with a zigeuner sauce containing tomato, bell peppers, and onion slices. This schnitzel is also called Paprikaschnitzel ('bell pepper schnitzel'), Schnitzel Balkan-Art ('Balkan-style schnitzel') or Schnitzel Budapester Art ('Budapest-style schnitzel').
- Rahmschnitzel (cream schnitzel) is a schnitzel with a cream sauce.
- Münchner Schnitzel ('Munich schnitzel') is a variation on Wiener schnitzel prepared with horseradish or mustard before coating in flour, egg and bread crumbs.
- Schnitzel Holstein, topped with an egg sunny side up.

==== Hungary ====
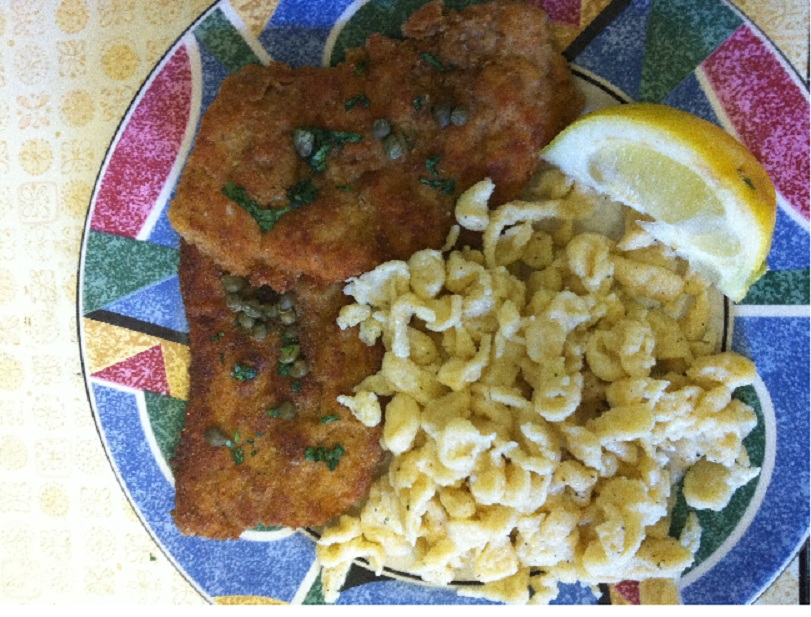
Hungarian schnitzel with nokedli

Due to the strong Austrian influence of the Austro-Hungarian era, Wiener schnitzel is popular in Hungary, known as bécsi szelet (Viennese slice), borjú bécsi (Viennese veal) or rántott hús (breaded meat). It is served in restaurants, and is a common meal in Hungarian homes. It is typically served with French fries, mashed potatoes, or rice. Alternatively, green peas or other vegetables are used as a side dish. Bread and salad (or pickles) often accompany the meal. Some restaurants offer the cordon bleu variant, a slice of schnitzel rolled and filled with cheese and ham.

==== Italy ====
In Italy, there is a similar dish called cotoletta alla Milanese, or simply Milanese. Cotoletta alla Milanese is very similar to the Austrian Wiener Schnitzel and it is at its origin. The Italian veal scaloppine is also somewhat similar although the meat is not breaded but enveloped with flour.

==== Netherlands and Belgium ====
In the Netherlands and Belgium, schnitzel is typically made from either pork or chicken and served with fries and a vegetable salad. Zigeunerschnitzel ("Gypsy schnitzel", served with paprika) and cordon bleu (kordonbleu or blue ribbon, breaded meat cutlet filled with ham and cheese) are very popular. A typical Dutch variant is the 'gehaktschnitzel', a schnitzel made of minced meat.

==== North Macedonia ====
In the Republic of North Macedonia, the dish called шницла (shnitzla) is a piece of pork seasoned with salt and black pepper, breaded and fried. Typically, it is served with mashed or fried potatoes with green salad garnish.

==== Poland ====
Kotlet schabowy is a classic, popular recipe for boneless pork chop or pork tenderloin. It can also be made from chicken, which is called "kotlet drobiowy".

==== Portugal ====
In Portugal, schnitzel is called bife panado or just panado ("breaded"). Different varieties of panado can be made with chicken (panado de frango), turkey (panado de peru), pork (costeleta panada for pork chop, febra panada for pork without bone), or veal (escalope de vitela panado). The meat is usually seasoned with black pepper, garlic, and lemon juice. It is commonly served with spaghetti, fried potatoes, or rice (plain or with beans). It is also popular as a sandwich, served in a bun with lettuce (sandes de panado).

==== Romania ====
Romanian șnițel (pronounced ['ʃni.t͡sel]) is very common in restaurants, fast-food places, and homes across the country. Normally served with french fries, mashed potatoes, or rice, and a slice of lemon or some salad, the fast food version is differentiated by being served sandwich/burger style. Cordon bleu șnițel (made from pork loin stuffed with cheese and ham) is also very popular. The Romanian șnițel is made in the same manner as the Austrian one, but as a local characteristic is made of almost any type of meat (chicken, pork, veal or beef).

A specialty from western Romania is the mosaic șnițel made of two thin meat layers (usually each layer of different meat) and a vegetable (usually mushroom) filling. Also a recipe for șnițel de ciuperci, a mushroom fritter, is common.

==== Russia ====
In Russia, the dish is called отбивная (otbivnaya), which literally means a piece of meat that has been beaten, although the name шницель (šnitselʹ) is also in use. Russian cuisine includes recipes of schnitzel prepared from pork, as well as beef, veal, and chicken.

==== Serbia ====
In Serbia, the dish is called bečka šnicla (Viennese schnitzel). A local urban legend states the dish originated in Serbia and not in Austria, but no one can say why. In Serbia, the word 'schnitzel' is used to describe any cutlet, not just breaded meat.

==== Slovakia ====
Schnitzel is highly popular in Slovakia, a country bordering Austria, where it is referred to as vyprážaný rezeň. or simply rezeň (in the Western parts of the country, especially in Bratislava, colloquially also schnitzel, or šniceľ). It is often made of pork or chicken, and is typically served with fried potatoes (not peeled), boiled potatoes, mashed potatoes, French fries (especially in canteens), potato salad, or rice.

==== Slovenia ====
German Schnitzel translates to Slovene as zrezek thus Wiener Schnitzel is called dunajski zrezek (Vienna is Dunaj in Slovenian). As in Austria a real dunajski zrezek is made of veal. Restaurants serving the dish can be found throughout the country, though typically it is made of pork or chicken. Dunajski zrezek is usually served with fried or roasted potato and a slice of lemon. Less popular is pariški zrezek, which is prepared the same way but with no breadcrumbs. In Slovenia, a schnitzel filled with ham and cheese, breaded and fried (cordon bleu) is called ljubljanski zrezek (after Ljubljana, the country's capital). Zrezek can also be grilled, fried, braised, or pot-roasted.

==== Spain ====
Schnitzel in Spain is Escalope or Escalopa, although a more common name is filete empanado (lit. breaded steak). There is a version of this dish made with chicken breasts usually called pechuga empanada. San Jacobo (commonly) or cachopo (in the region of Asturias) is usually made with veal or pork stuffed with ham and cheese. It is common for Spanish families to have filete empanado or variants together with potato omelettes, on picnics in the countryside or at the beach.

Another variation of this dish is the flamenquín, made by putting together pork and a slice of ham, making it into a roll, tarnishing the roll and then frying it. This dish is typical from the Andalusian city of Córdoba.

==== Sweden ====
In Sweden, the dish is called schnitzel or Wienerschnitzel, and is made most commonly of pork, and is often decorated with a caper-filled circle of either genuine anchovies or the Swedish "fake" ansjovis (made of brine-cured sprats). It is served with rice, fries, or boiled potatoes, and green peas.

==== Switzerland ====
Schnitzel, Schnipo, Wienerschnitzel, and Rahmschnitzel are all popular dishes in Switzerland. Schnipo (a schnitzel and fried potato combination) is quite popular. The Rahmschnitzel version is made with either veal or pork and topped with a cream sauce, sometimes including mushrooms. The cordon bleu variant of schnitzel – two slices of schnitzel (or one with a pocket) filled with cheese, typically Emmentaler or Gruyere, and a slice of ham – is also popular in Switzerland. Also the "Walliser Schnitzel" is a variant in which the meat is not breaded, but is fried in oil and then coated with tomato sauce and raclette cheese.

==== Ukraine ====
In West Ukraine (former Habsburg Kingdom of Galicia and Lodomeria), it is known as шніцель shnitsel′; in the rest of the country, it is called as відбивна vidbyvna, also bytky. It is typically made from pork, or occasionally chicken.

==== United Kingdom ====
The parmo, or Teesside Parmesan, is a schnitzel popular in Middlesbrough, Teesside, and a popular item of take-away food in North East England. It consists of a breaded cutlet of chicken or pork topped with a white béchamel sauce and cheese, usually cheddar cheese.

=== Middle East ===
==== Iran ====
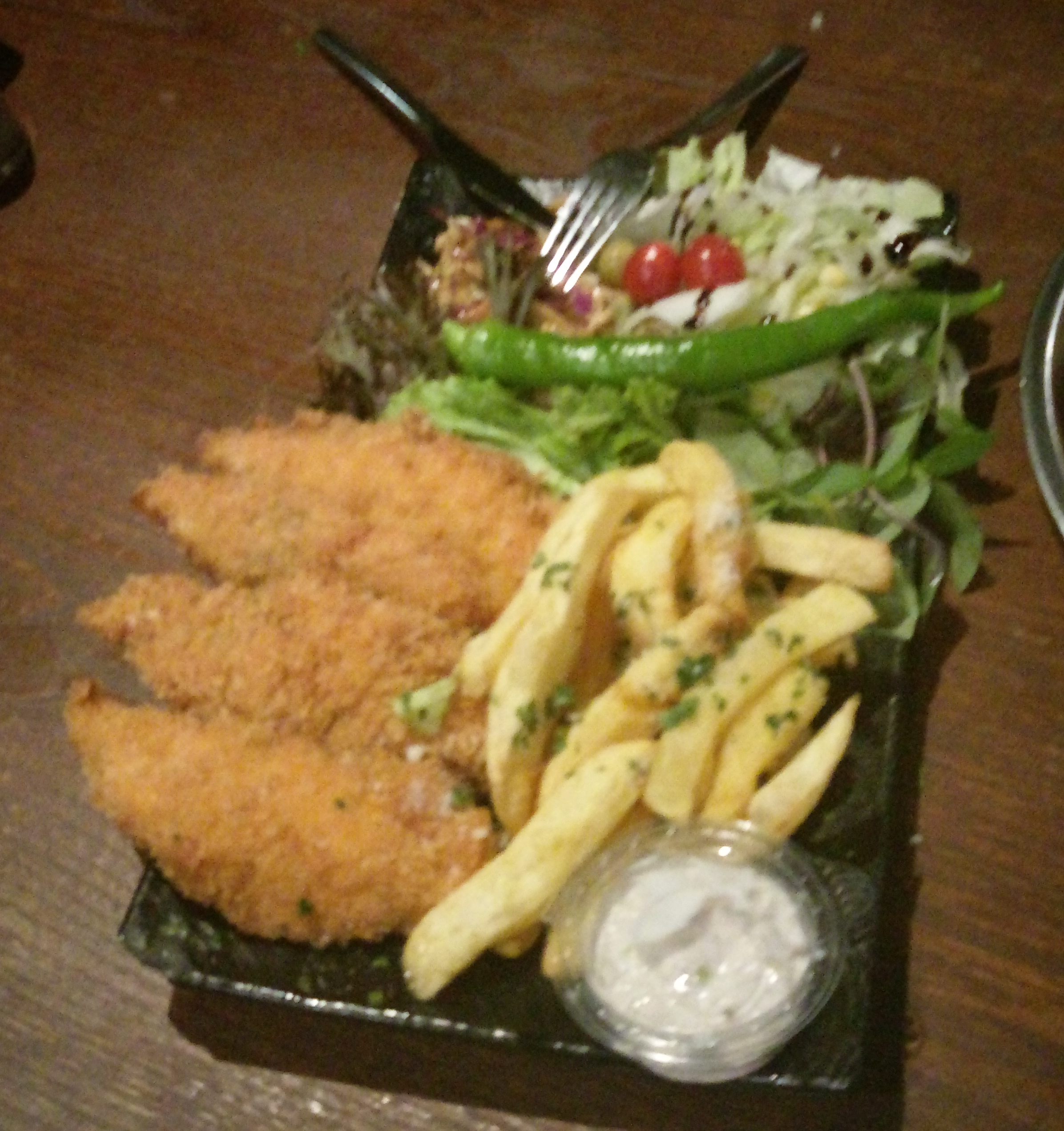
Schnitzel as served at an Iranian restaurant

Schnitzel is popular in Iran, where it is known as shenitsel (Persian: شنیتسل). Thought to have been introduced in Persia during the World Wars, shenitsel is usually thicker, bigger, spicier, and fried with a more crispy breading than the standard schnitzel. It is customarily served with lemon, French fries, and a variety of boiled vegetables.

Another Iranian dish, kotlet (Persian: کتلت), should not be confused with shenitsel. They are small, oval-shaped patties made by deep-frying a mix of ground meat, onion, potato, and herbs.

==== Israel ====
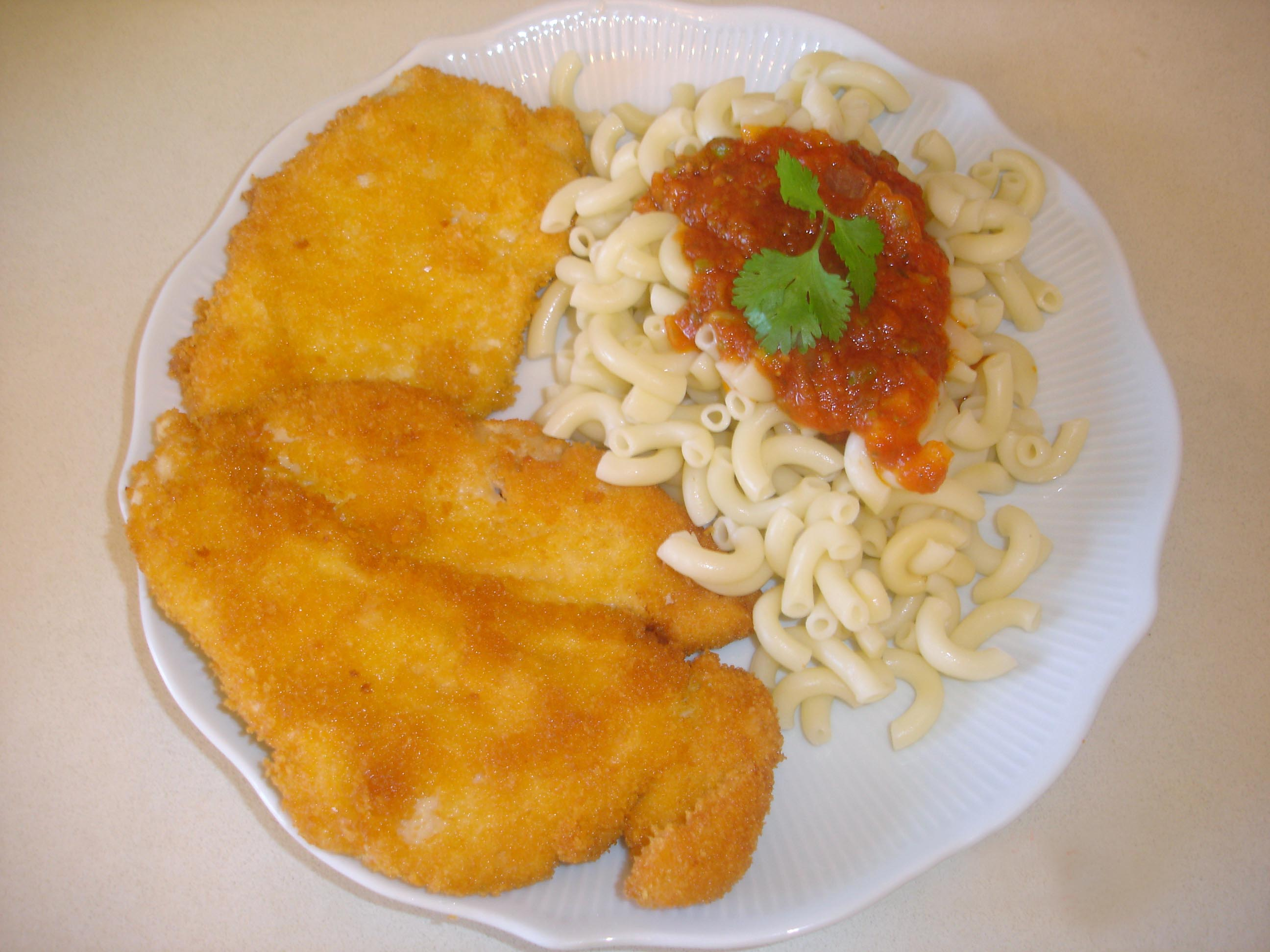
Israeli schnitzel with pasta and tomato sauce

In Israel, the dish (Hebrew: שניצל, shnitsel) is a popular food in Israeli cuisine. The meat is typically chicken or turkey breast, because chicken and turkey were more affordable in Israel and in order to conform with dietary kashrut laws, which prohibit pork. Additionally, vegetable oils are used for frying, as clarified butter, the preferred cooking fat for Austrian Wiener schnitzel, is impermissible for kosher use alongside meat. Before frying, the schnitzel is coated with a mixture of beaten eggs and bread crumbs, sometimes spiced with paprika or sesame seeds. It is usually served with mashed potatoes, French fries, rice, or pasta, accompanied by ketchup, hummus, or vegetable salad.

The schnitzel tradition was brought from Europe to Israel by Ashkenazi Jews. During the early years of the state of Israel, veal was not available, and chicken or turkey proved to be inexpensive. Packaged schnitzels are widely available in the frozen food section of most supermarkets. Some frozen schnitzels are breaded patties made from processed chicken or turkey meat, not whole poultry breasts. One can also find in the frozen food section Israeli corn schnitzels alongside other vegan options. Schnitzel is also sold in a pita, alongside hummus, French fries, and vegetable salad, in a similar way to falafel. Many falafel stands also offer a schnitzel in a pita.

==== Lebanon ====
In Lebanon, the dish is normally called escalope. Escalope is a French term and is a broader category of beaten, breaded meat of which Schnitzel is a type. While schnitzels are fried, escalopes need not be, even though they most commonly are. Lebanon likely adopted the French term during the French mandate period.

==== Turkey ====
In Turkey, the dish is spelled schnitzel, şinitzel, or şnitzel and pronounced in a similar way to German. It is made of chicken and is usually served with rice, French fries, or pasta. Sometimes, it may have grilled cheese in it. It is often cooked at home, as it is an easy-to-do kind of food, but some restaurants have it on their menus.

=== North America ===
==== Canada ====
In Canada, Schnitzel is often referred to simply as veal cutlet or chicken cutlet, breaded and fried. Often with Italian tomato sauce, parmigiana cheese or mozzarella cheese. It is often topped with red peppers and it is very commonly served as a sandwich.

==== Mexico ====
In Mexico, Schnitzel is commonly referred to as milanesa. Milanesas are eaten in some regions, often in a torta (a sandwich made with bolillo or telera bread). In northern Baja California, Sonora, Sinaloa, and Chihuahua (due to U.S. influence), it features lettuce, tomato, and mayonnaise like a traditional sandwich, but the milanesa is also common in these regions as the main course of a meal. The milanesa memela napolitana is made with a thick fried tortilla with a milanesa on top, with ham, tomato sauce and grated cheese. In Mexico, milanesa usually refers to the preparation method; any type of meat that is pounded thin, breaded and fried might be referred to as a milanesa. In the northern state of Nuevo León, perhaps due to the influence of German and Czech immigrants, the dish known as milanesa is extremely popular and stands on its own as a main dish in most restaurants. It is usually served with French fries, refried beans, rice, and a lettuce salad.

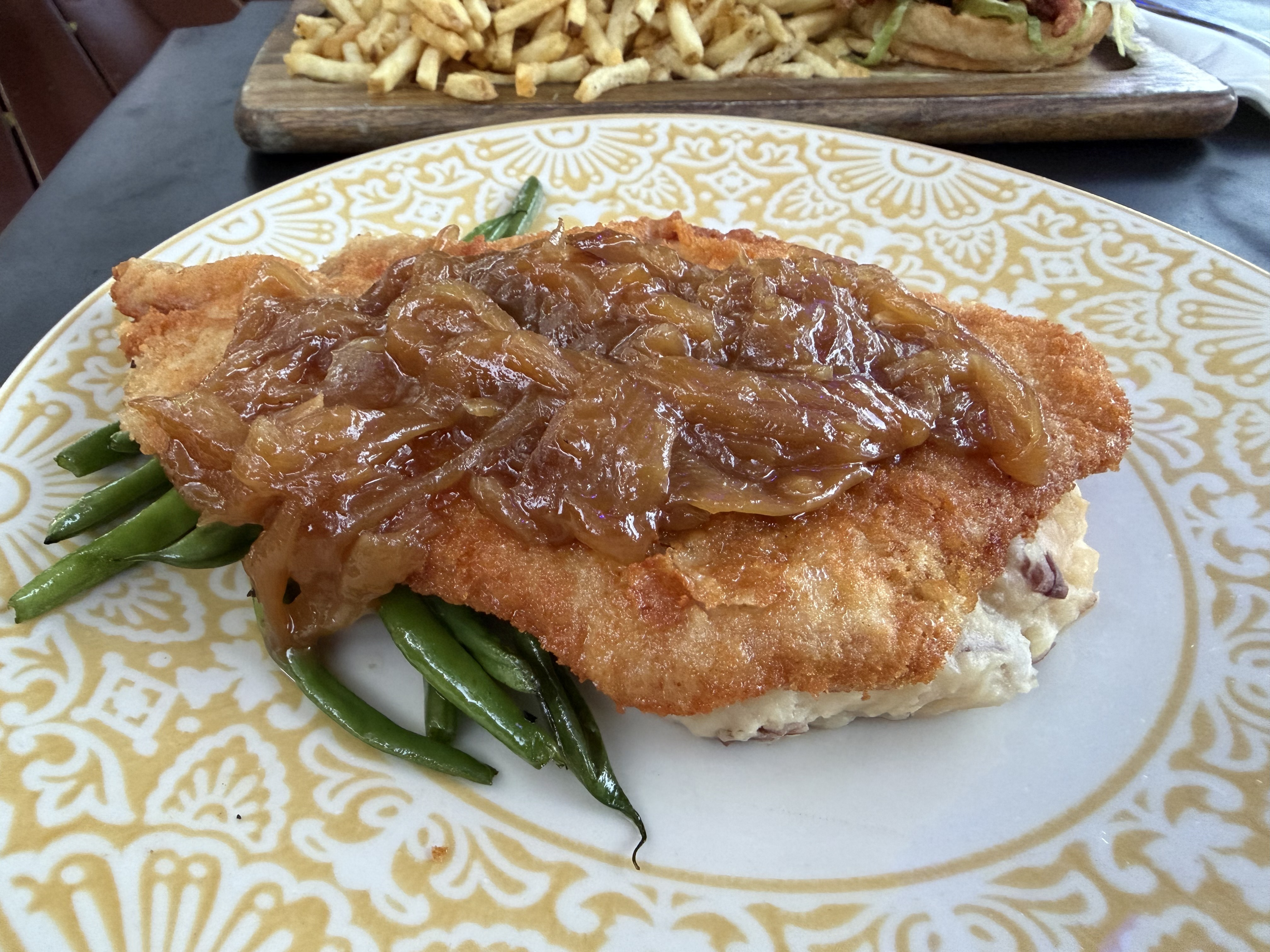
Pork schnitzel over mashed potatoes, with green beans, served at a restaurant in Delray Beach, FL.

==== United States ====
Fried cutlets are a popular convenience meal; they can be purchased pre-cooked and frozen, and heated at home. The pork tenderloin sandwich, popular in the Midwest, is made from a breaded pork tenderloin and is very similar to schnitzel. Chicken-fried steak, also called country-fried steak, is nearly identical to schnitzel. It is a breaded and deep-fried beef steak. The beef is generally a shoulder or a round cut, rather than an expensive loin or rib steak. It is usually served with white gravy.

=== Oceania ===
==== Australia ====
Beef (which may be veal) and chicken schnitzel are both very popular dishes in Australia, particularly in pubs where they are among the most widely available meals. Chicken schnitzel (less so beef) is also sold at many take-away establishments.

Schnitzel in Australia is often served in the form of parmigiana, which is a schnitzel topped with Italian tomato sauce, cheese, and occasionally ham.

At pubs, schnitzel is typically accompanied by chips (French fries), salad, and sometimes bacon. Plain and parmigiana schnitzels are sometimes respectively known by colloquial names "schnitty", "snitty", "schnitter", "parma", or "parmi".

=== South America ===
==== Argentina, Paraguay and Uruguay ====
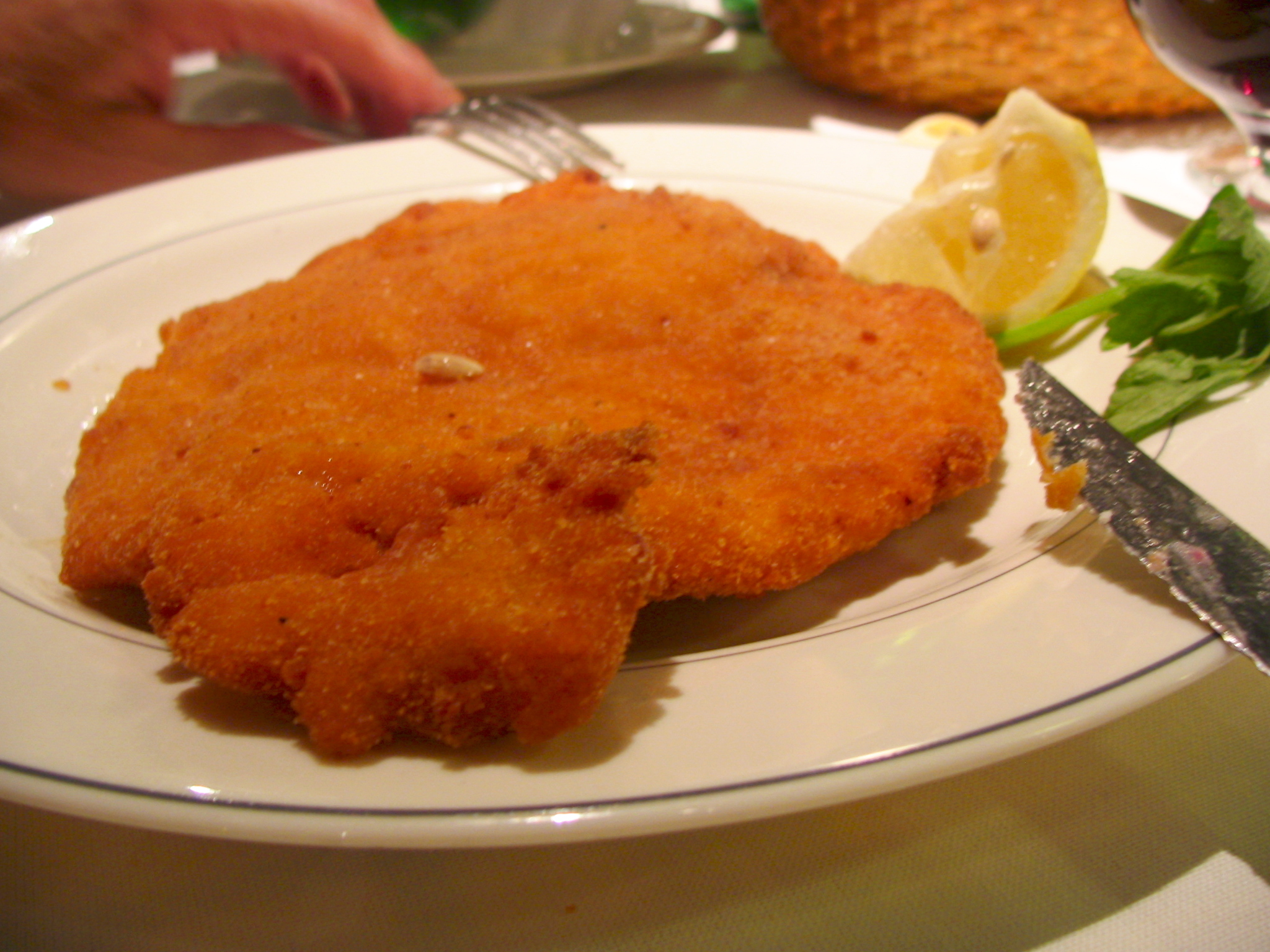
Milanesa

In Argentina, Paraguay and Uruguay, this dish, called milanesa, consists of a thin slice of beef, chicken, veal, or sometimes pork, and even eggplant or soy. Each slice is dipped into beaten eggs, seasoned with salt, and other ingredients according to the cook's taste (like parsley and garlic). Each slice is then dipped in bread crumbs (or occasionally flour) and shallow-fried in oil, one at a time. Some people prefer to use very little oil and then bake them in the oven as a healthier alternative. Lemon is commonly squeezed on top of the already cooked milanesa for added flavour.

==== Brazil ====
In Brazil, such preparations, designated à milanesa (Milanese-style), are quite common, especially in the more European-influenced southern region of the country. The meats of choice are beef or chicken, while veal and pork are relatively rare.

==== Colombia ====
Schnitzel presentations are called chuleta in Colombia. They are composed of flat pieces of chicken, veal, or mostly pork, covered with flour, and then deep-fried. The chuleta is a traditional dish of the Valle del Cauca region.

== Similar foods ==
Other variants of the schnitzel, not all necessarily made with a bread crumb crust, include:

- Escalope: A piece of boneless meat that has been thinned out using a mallet, rolling pin, or beaten with the handle of a knife, or merely butterflied. Although it is usually a thinner cut of meat than found in a schnitzel, the meat of an escalope is also usually coated with flour, beaten eggs and bread crumbs, and then fried.
- Cordon bleu: "Blue ribbon" is a thinly pounded piece of meat stuffed with cheese and ham.
- Valdostana: Very similar to the cordon bleu, but cheese and ham are not inside but on the top. This dish is from an alpine region in Italy, the Val d'Aosta.
- Chicken Kiev is unpounded chicken breast rolled around butter and sometimes garlic, then breaded and cooked in a manner similar to cordon bleu.
- Milanesa Napolitana: This River Plate variant, very popular in Argentina and Uruguay, is made from a beef schnitzel topped with ham, marinara sauce (tomato and garlic), and local mozzarella, then grilled to melt the cheese, usually served with French fries (British: chips).
- Singapore Hainanese pork chop: Served in a gravy with tomatoes, potato wedges, onions and peas, it is sometimes served with steamed rice and chilli sauce.
- Piccata is breaded meat like schnitzel with a sharp sauce based on lemon juice.
- Chicken fingers are chicken breast strips breaded and fried similar to schnitzel.
- Chicken-fried steak is a piece of cube steak coated with seasoned flour, and pan-fried. Popular in the southern United States, it is typically served covered in white gravy.
- Parmo is popular in north-east England, particularly Teesside; it is covered in bechamel sauce and served with chips and salad.
- (Cotoletta alla) Milanese A dish very similar to the Wiener schnitzel, but fried in butter instead of vegetable oil.

== Gallery ==
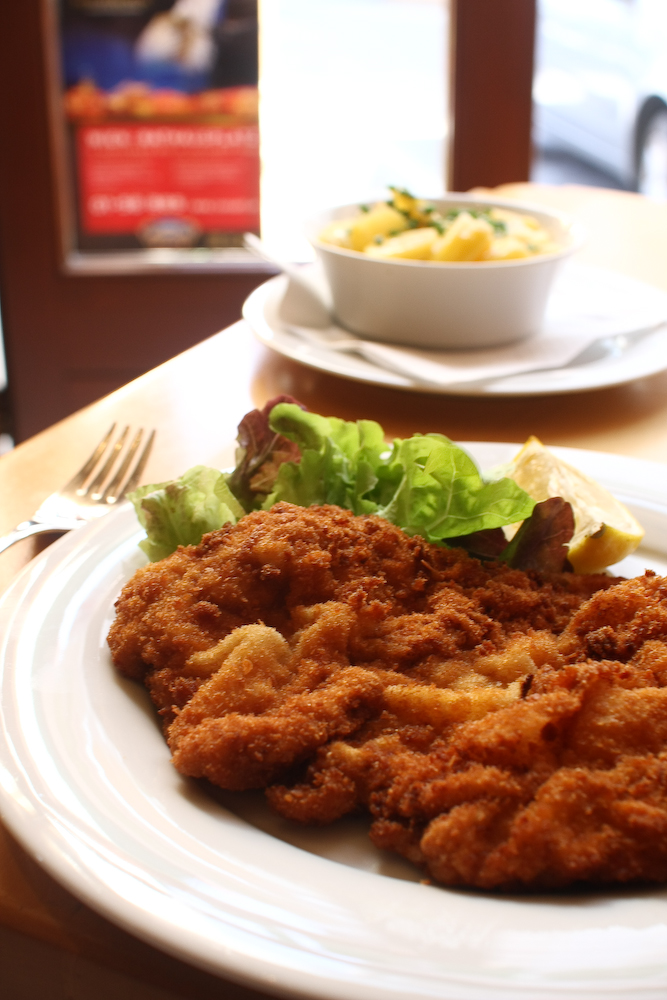
Wiener schnitzel from veal, as served in Vienna

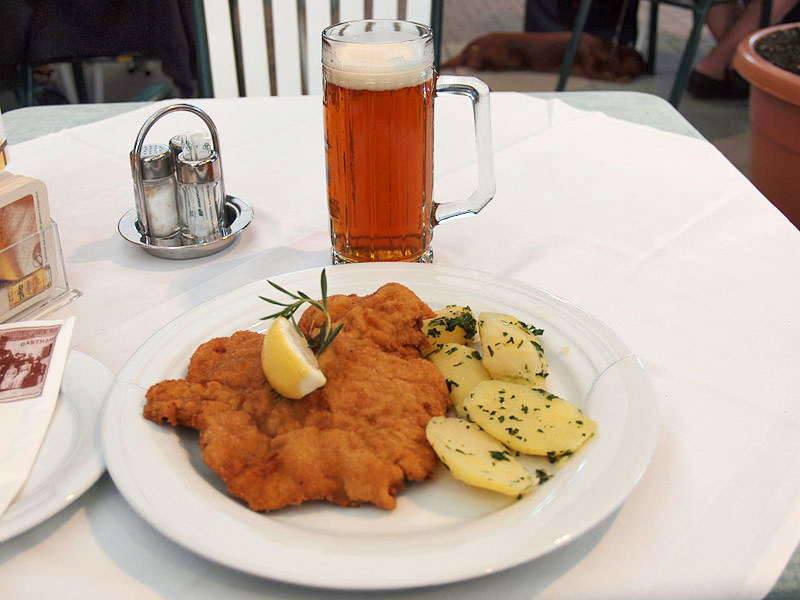
A Wiener schnitzel served in Carinthia, Austria

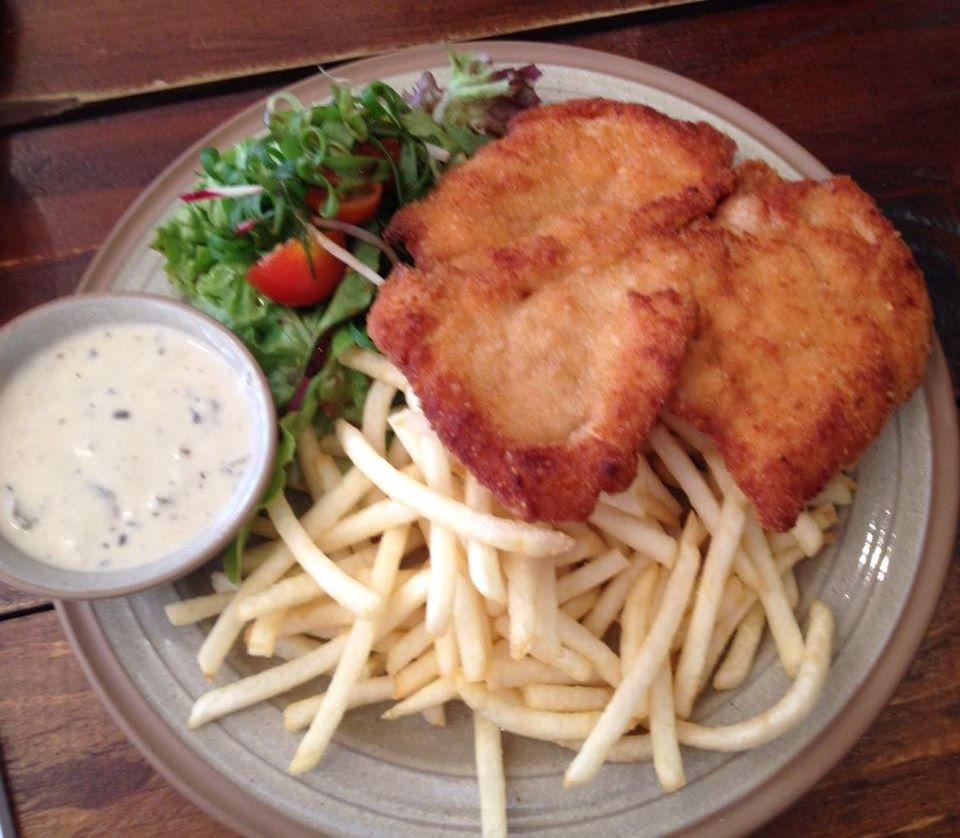
Chicken schnitzel with fries and salad

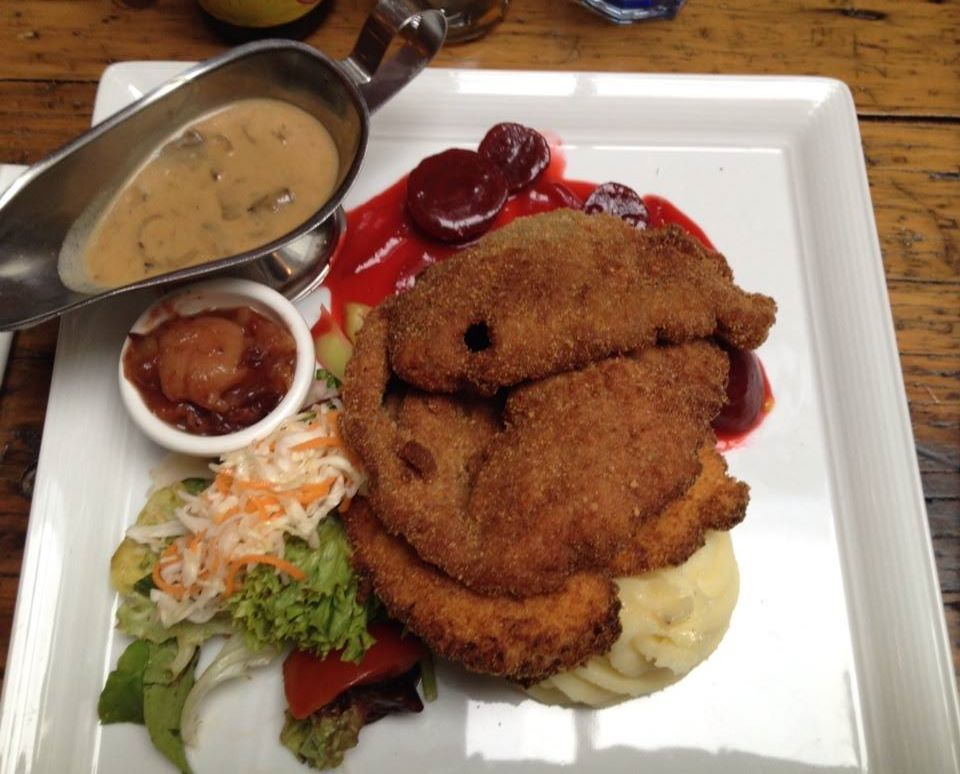
Schnitzel platter consisting of veal, pork, and chicken schnitzels, served with mashed potatoes, beetroot, mushroom cream sauce and side salad

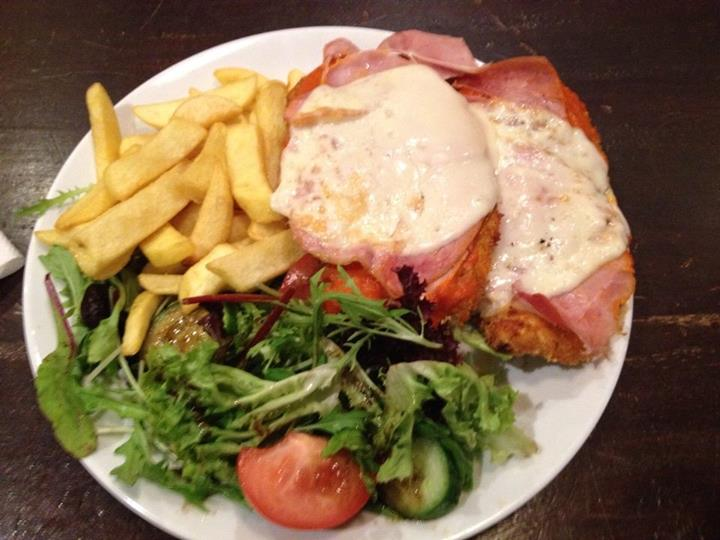
Swiss schnitzel, served with french fries and side salad

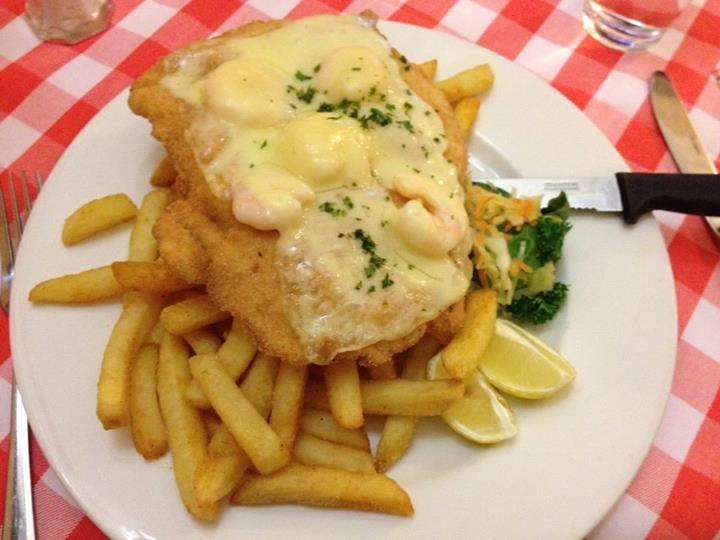
Surf and turf schnitzel: a chicken schnitzel topped with prawns and served with french fries

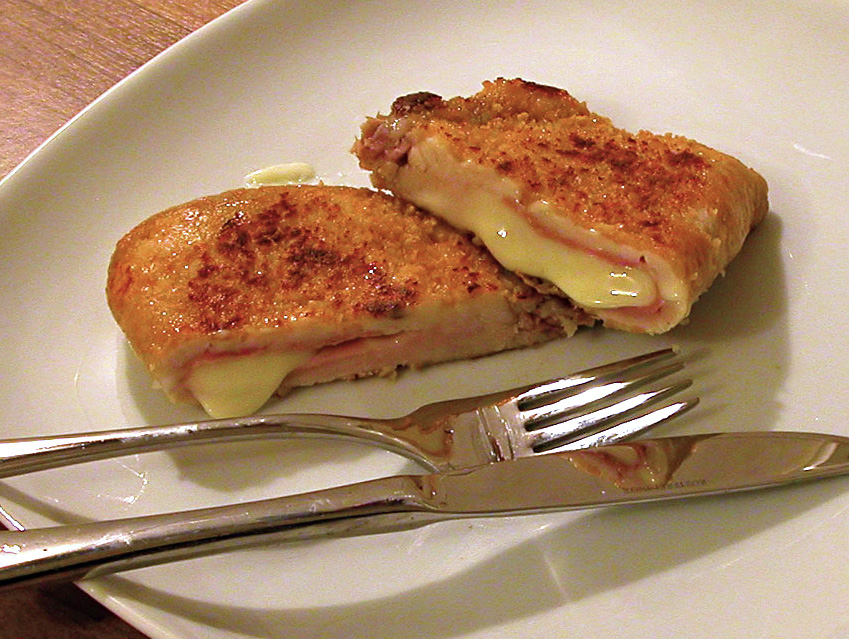
A cordon bleu schnitzel

== See also ==
- Karađorđeva šnicla – a kind of cordon bleu
- List of veal dishes
