= Corn schnitzel =

Israeli corn dish

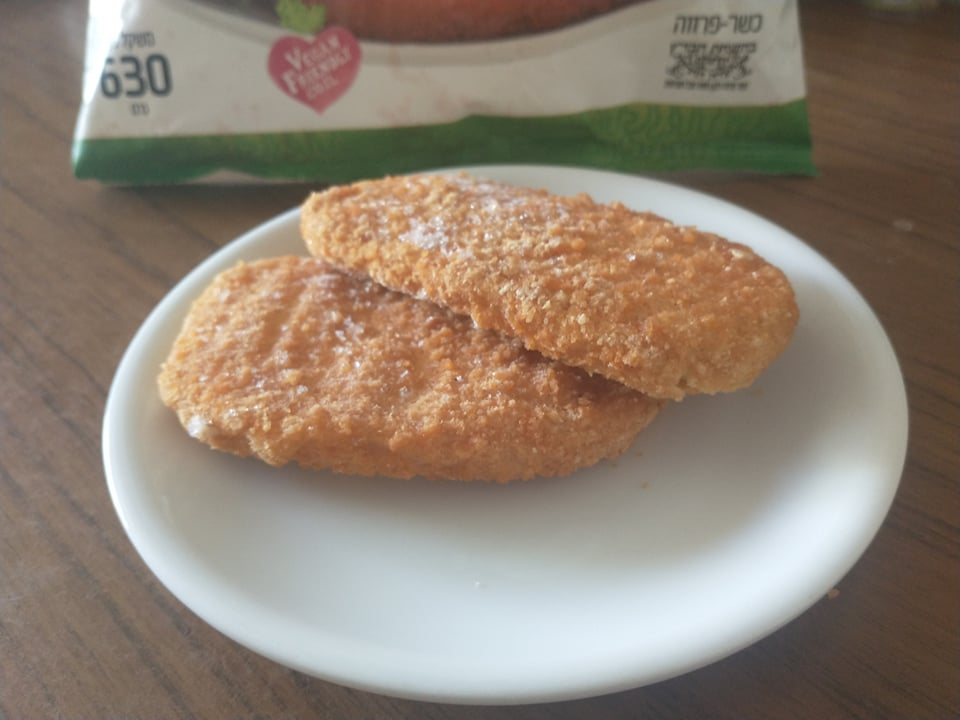
- Alternative names: Shnitzel Tiras, maize schnitzel
- Type: Schnitzel
- Course: Main course
- Place of origin: Israel
- Serving temperature: Warm
- Main ingredients: Corn, eggs (not in vegan versions), breadcrumbs, flour, matzo meal during Pesach

Corn schnitzel (Hebrew: שניצל תירס) is an Israeli fried corn dish and variant of Israeli schnitzel. During the 1990s, it was a common food in Israel for vegetarians and vegans, being pareve, and has since become a popular food on children's menus.

== History ==
Corn schnitzel is an Israeli dish, described by Hadassah Magazine as a food commonly served in Israel to vegetarians and vegans during the late 1990s. Commercially produced, frozen corn schnitzel is sold in supermarkets. Corn schnitzel has since become a food popular among children, being commonly found on children's menus, including at Café Café. It has also been described as an Israeli comfort food.

== Overview ==
Corn schnitzel consists of frozen, canned, or other cooked corn that has been pureed in a food processor and mixed with egg, flour, breadcrumbs, and various spices and seasonings to form a stiff batter. The batter is then scooped and formed into disks or oval-shaped, then it is breaded with a mixture of breadcrumbs and sesame seeds and fried. It is often served with a sauce and a side of Israeli salad or mashed potatoes, especially as a meal for children.

== See also ==
- Latkes
