= Jägerschnitzel =

German veal or pork cutlet dish

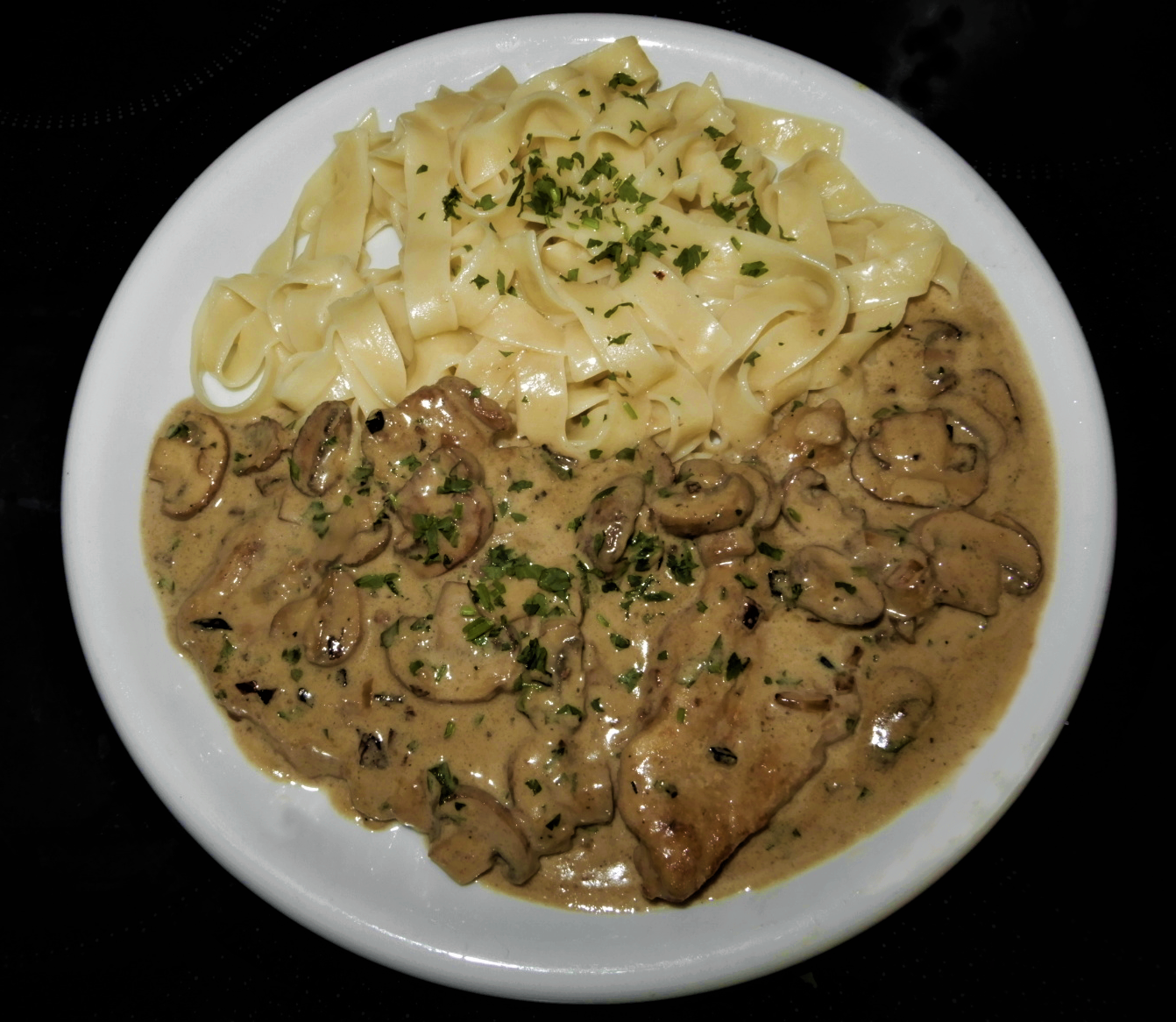
Jägerschnitzel with fettucine

Jägerschnitzel (German: [ˈjɛːɡɐˌʃnɪtsl̩]; lit. 'hunter's schnitzel') is a German dish made of a roast veal or pork cutlet with a sauce made of mushrooms and tomatoes or cream. In regional cuisine the dish can also be a schnitzel made of breaded, roasted jagdwurst with tomato sauce and Spätzle.

== Classic preparation ==
To prepare jägerschnitzel in the classic way, an unbreaded veal cutlet is first roasted in butter. The sauce is made of shallots soaked in white wine and cooked in a tomato sauce, and mixed with sliced field mushrooms, chanterelles and morels. A variation of the dish is a shortly roasted pork cutlet in sour cream topped with fried onions, chanterelles and bell pepper.

A common variety of jägerschnitzel consists of a breaded pork cutlet with a dark mushroom cream sauce. It is usually served with french fries, noodles, or rice.

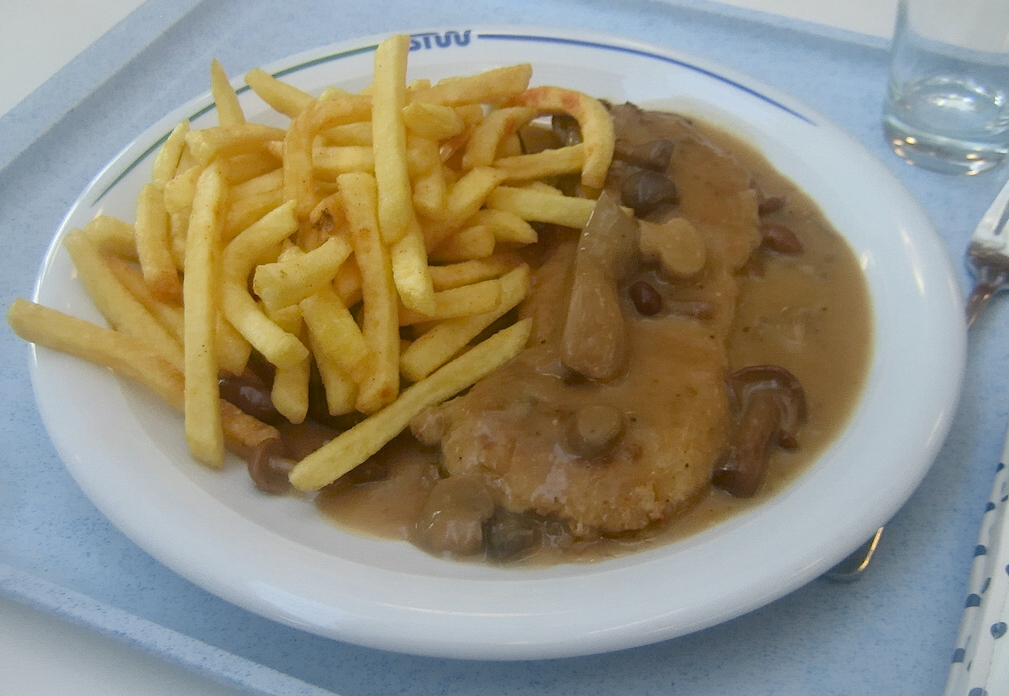
A Jägerschnitzel in mushroom sauce with French fries

== Eastern German variation ==
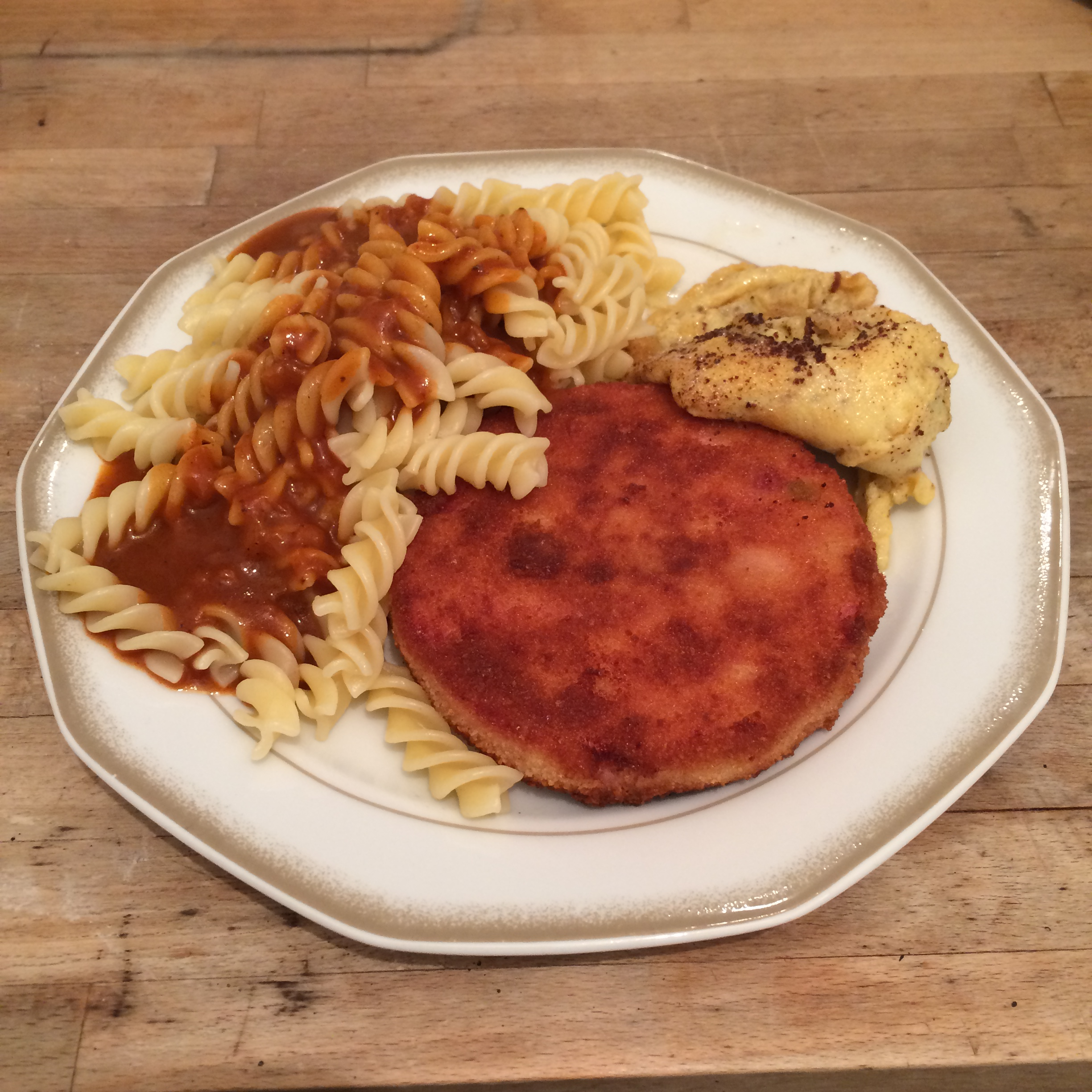
Jägerschnitzel made from jagdwurst with fusilli and tomato sauce

A common regional variation in eastern Germany is made from Jagdwurst, a type of pork sausage. To prepare jägerschnitzel from Jagdwurst, the sausage is first cut into finger-thick slices, breaded with bread roll crumbs and roasted in cooking oil or clarified butter until crispy and topped with tomato paste, ketchup, or a combination of both. It is usually served with pasta, potatoes (mashed potato, french fries or potato salad), or served alone as a snack.

The dish was popular during the era of East Germany, particularly served in volume at canteens or as a school meal, often served with vegetables and lecsó.

== Bibliography ==
- Herbert Frauenberger: Ostdeutsche Gerichte mit Geschichte(n), Second edition. BuchVerlag für die Frau, Leipzig 2017, ISBN 978-3-89798-513-1, p. 64.
