= Jagdwurst =

German sausage

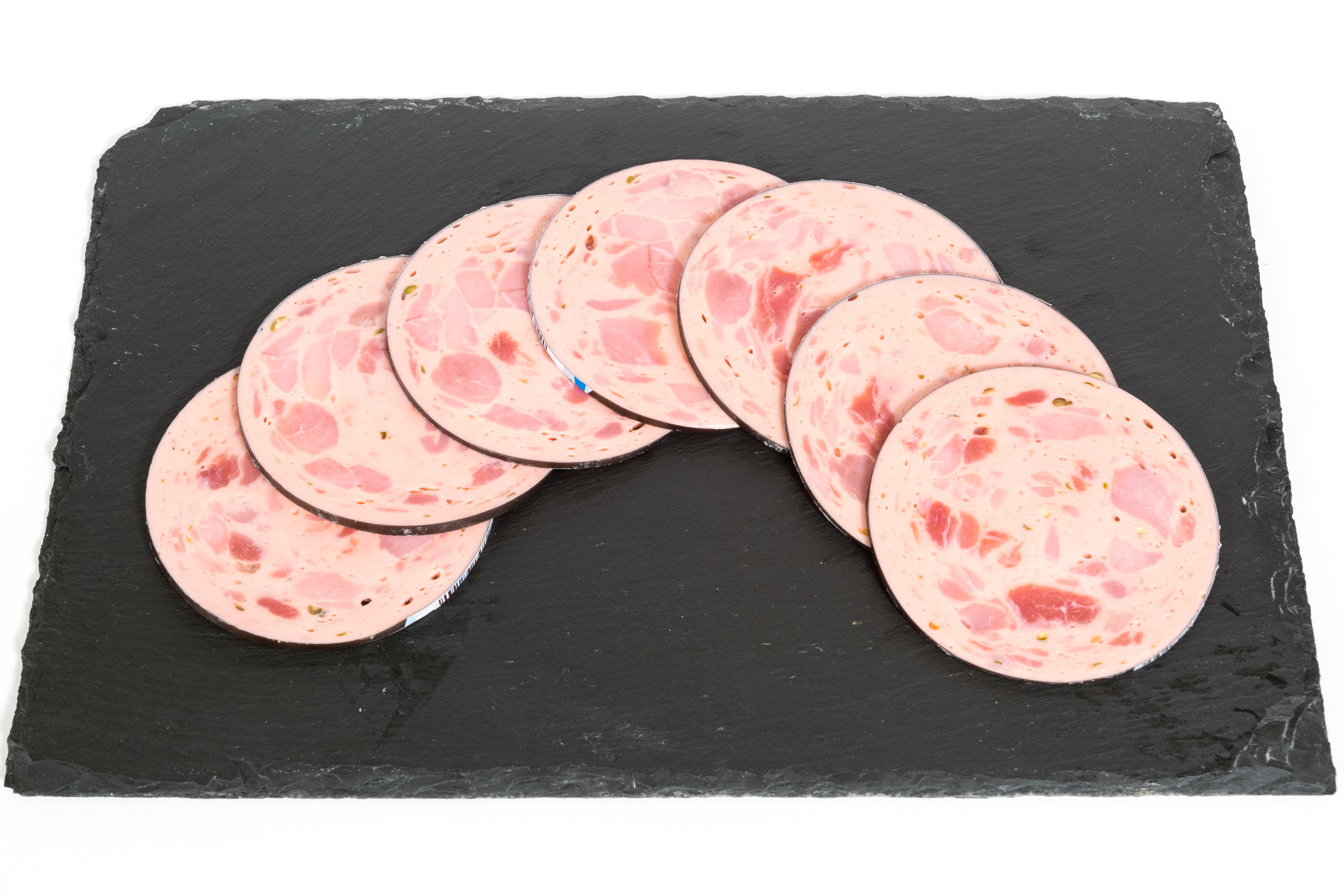
Jagdwurst from Tyrol

Jagdwurst (literally hunting sausage) is a German cooked sausage made with finely ground pork sausage meat and coarse chunks of lean pork or pork belly. Some recipes also include beef. The meat is usually seasoned with salt and flavoured with spices such as green peppercorns, mace, ginger and coriander. North German styles of Jagdwurst often contain mustard seeds, and in the south, pistachio pieces are a common ingredient.

Jagdwurst can be eaten cold, for example in sandwiches, or hot, sometimes cut into soup and other hot dishes.

In eastern Germany, fried, sliced Jagdwurst, often coated in breadcrumbs, is termed Jägerschnitzel. The dish is essentially a lower-budget schnitzel conceived in harder times and popular in East Germany, using sausage instead of lean meat due to its lower price and higher availability. The more traditional, common preparation of jägerschnitzel comprises an escalope of lean pork or veal served with a mushroom sauce, also known as Schnitzel nach Jäger Art (lit. 'huntsman-style schnitzel').
