= Remia =

Dutch food company

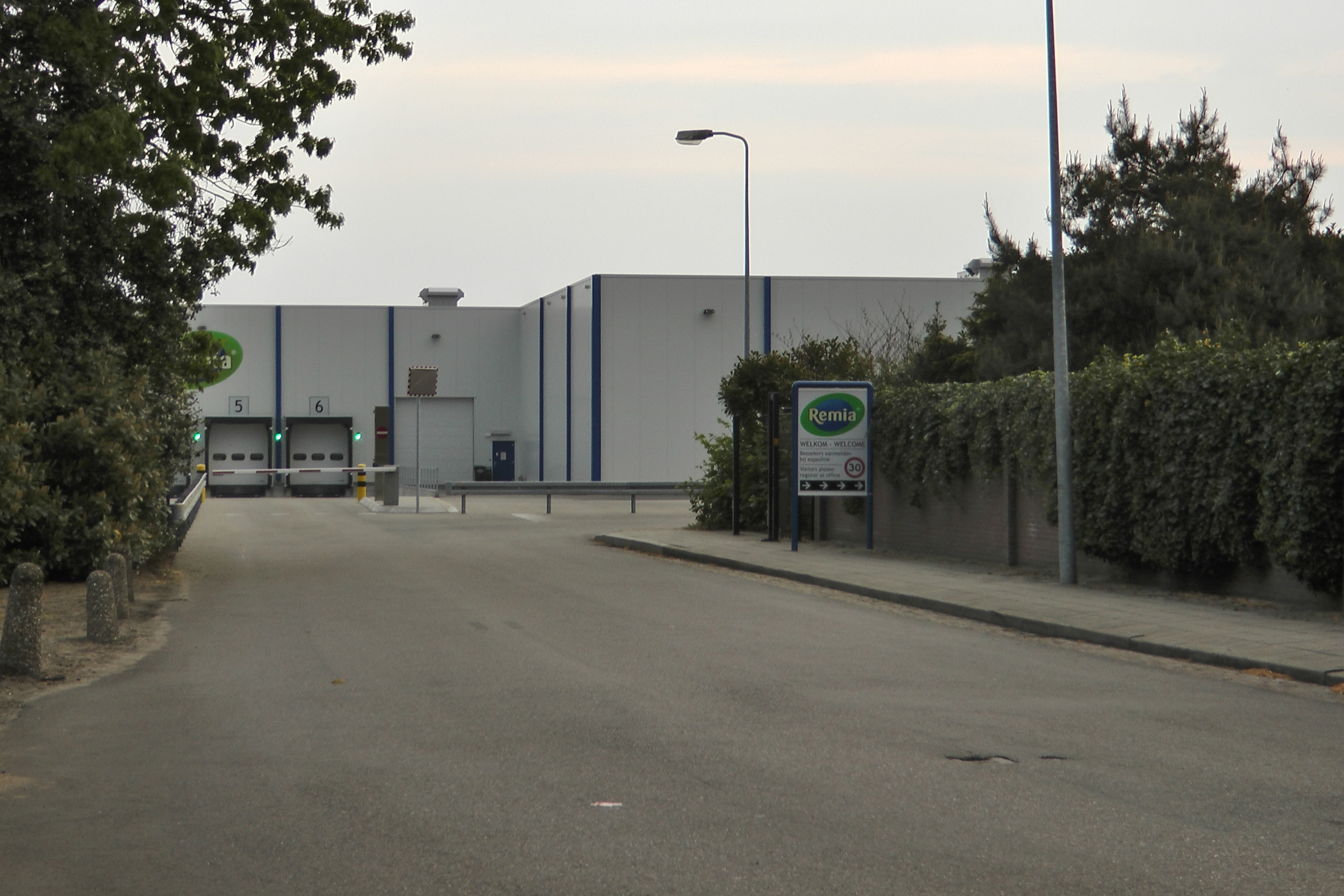
Remia, in Den Dolder

Remia is a Dutch producer of margarine, tomato ketchup, salad dressings and sauces, based in Den Dolder.

== History ==
Remia originated in October 1925, when Arie de Rooij began to produce margarine and butter in his Amersfoort-based garage and basement. Later, he started up a mixing plant in which margarine with butter was mixed. De Rooij's Electrical Melangeer Installation Amersfoort, abbreviated Remia was a fact. Remia then grew rapidly, and in 1951, the company moved to larger premises in Den Dolder. In 1960 a modern sauce factory was opened. Since then, the company is best known for its range of sauces.

=== Acquisitions ===
As of 30 April 2010 Remia took over the mustard factory De Marne's Fabrieken BV from the France-based Gyma Group. As of 4 August 2011 Remia took over the sauces activities of Van Dijk Food Products in Lopik. In addition, both companies entered into a strategic partnership. On 1 February 2015 Remia acquired Yillys Food Concepts BV, which is well-known for its Yil’driz sauce portfolio.
