= Sibiu Salami =

Romanian salami

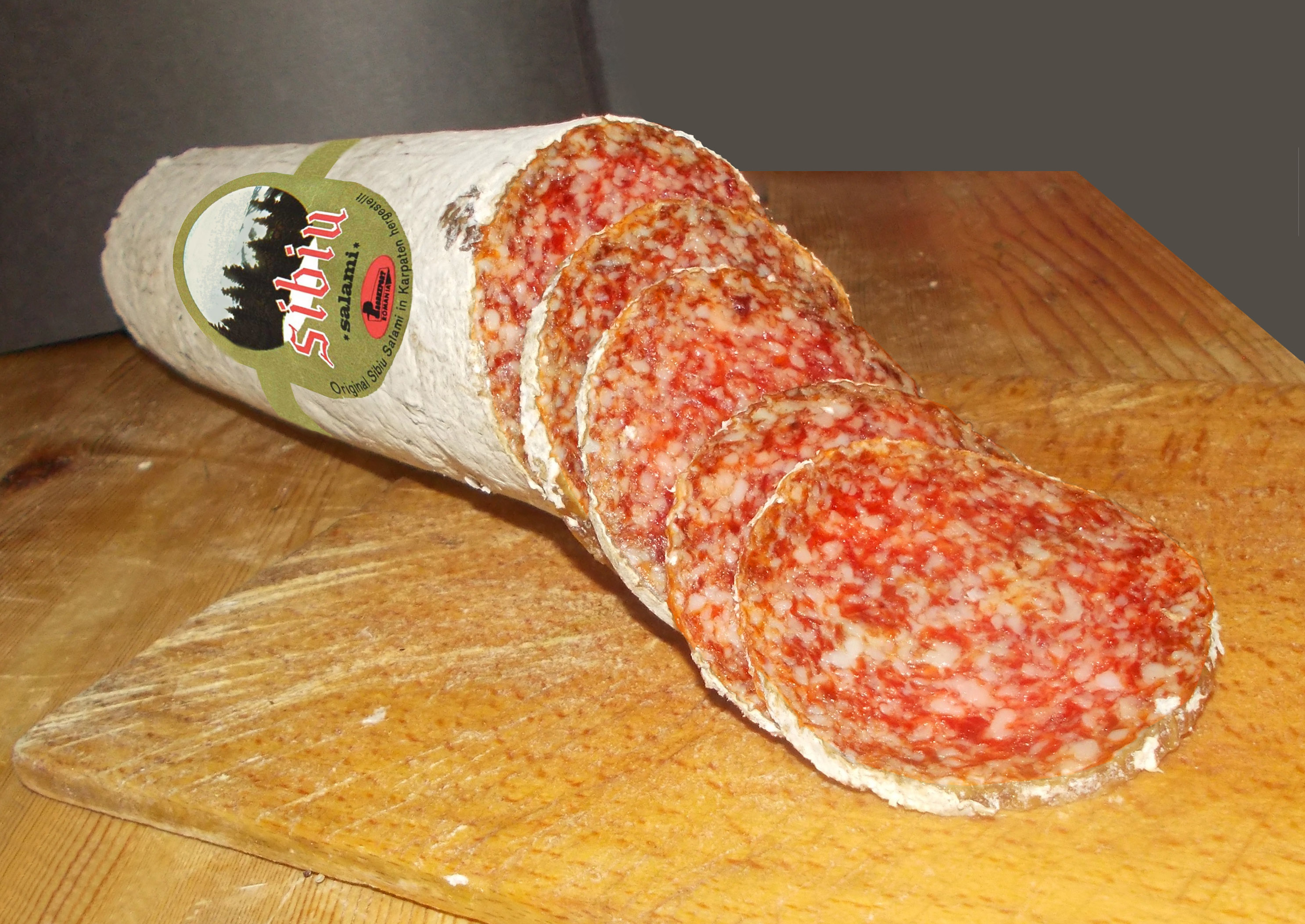
Sibiu Salami

Sibiu Salami, in Romanian salam de Sibiu, is a Romanian variety of salami made with pork meat, pork fat, salt and condiments. In 2016, the Salam de Sibiu has been registered as a protected geographical indication (PGI) product in the European Union.

== History ==
In 1885, an Italian named Filippo Dozzi emigrated to Romania to work as a bricklayer. Originating in north-eastern Italy, (Frisanco), Filippo Dozzi moved with his wife near Piatra Arsă's quarry in the former village of Poiana Țapului.

Besides being a bricklayer, Dozzi had also a passion for sausages. He noted that weather conditions of Sinaia were favorable for the production of dry sausages. In 1910, Dozzi decided to buy a building in Sinaia that housed a restaurant, a wine cellar and a hotel, where he founded his company called Întreprinderea Individuală Filippo Dozzi (The Individual Enterprise Filippo Dozzi). Production of salami started and became quickly a success and a luxury product. Dozzi began selling his sausage under the name of salam de iarnă (winter salami), and for exports in the Austro-Hungarian Empire was affixed the stamp "Customs of Sibiu". Thus, the product became known as Salam de Sibiu. The name winter salami was used only in Romania and Hungary, though the Hungarian winter salami was different from the Sibiu Salami.

Before his death in 1943, Filippo Dozzi confided to his sons, Antonio and Giuseppe, the secret of Sibiu Salami. They continued the work of their father until the nationalization of the company by the Communist regime.

Not long after Dozzi, Josef Theil, a winter salami producer from Mediaș, opened in 1922 a second factory in Sibiu (as the "Theil & Co. A.G. Salami und Selchwarenfabrik") and started producing a variant of salami named "Veritabilul salam de Sibiu" ("The real Sibiu salami").

Between 1948 and 1954, the communist government nationalized both companies. The state company, named Întreprinderea pentru Industrializarea Cărnii (Enterprise for the Industrial Processing of Meat), continued the production, with first deliveries of Sibiu Salami abroad being made in the 1950s. In 1963, the Sibiu factory (which was producing the Sibiu Salami at its subsidiary in Mediaș) registered the trademark Salam de Sibiu. Besides Sinaia and Mediaș, between 1975–1976, more "production units" were established in Bacău, Galați, and Salonta for the manufacturing of Sibiu Salami. In the 1980s, 90% of the production (40-50 tons per month) was exported to Austria, West-Germany, Czechoslovakia, Israel, Belgium, Sweden, and the Soviet Union.

Nowadays, the Sibiu Salami is produced in Sinaia, Bacău, Călărași, Feldioara, Filipeștii de Pădure and Sibiu. In 2014, more than 3,000 tons were produced.

== See also ==
- List of sausages
