= Salami =

Cured sausage, fermented and air-dried meat

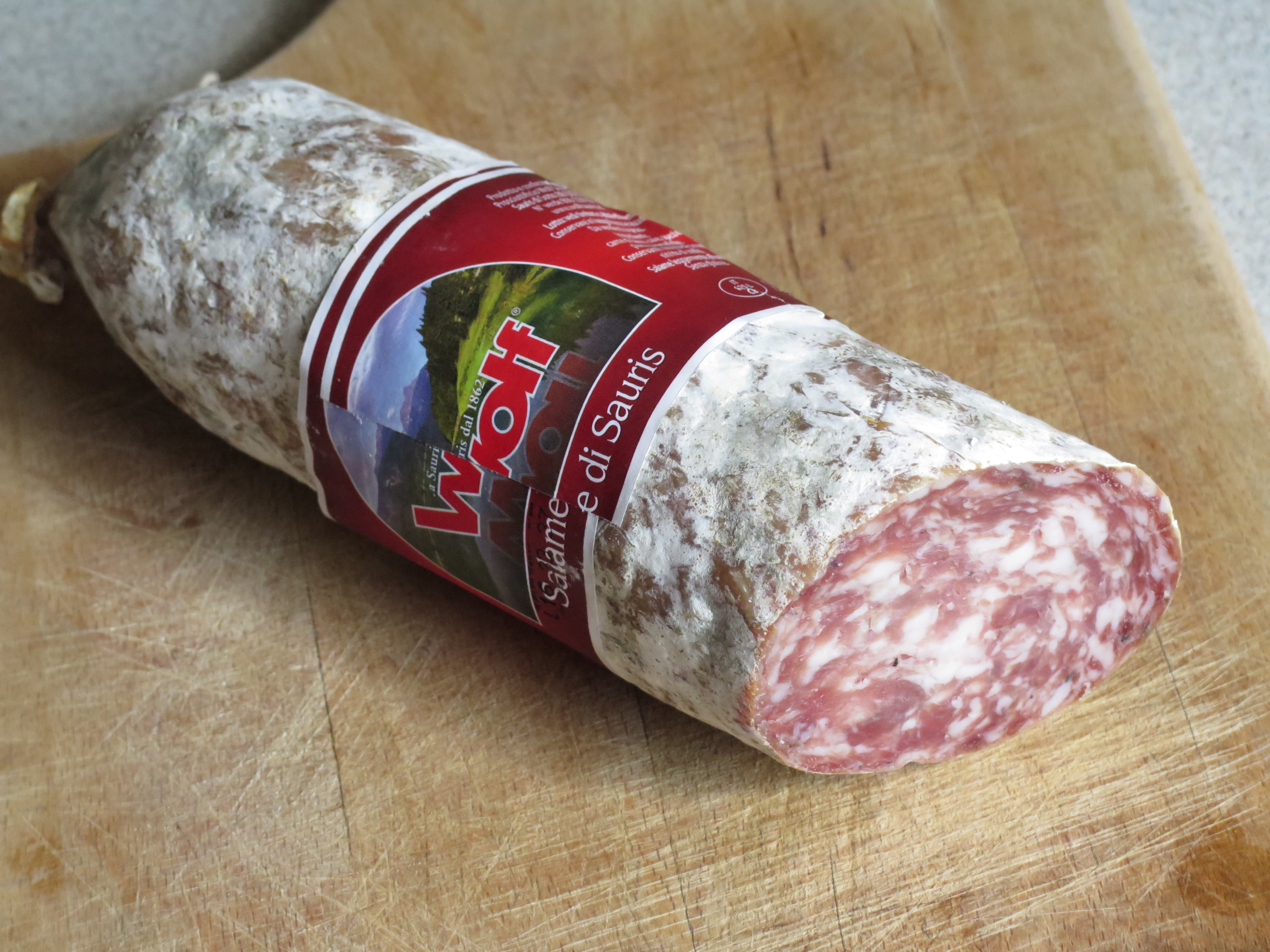
- Salame di Sauris
- Alternative names: Salame (Italian singular form)
- Type: Sausage
- Place of origin: Italy
- Main ingredients: Fermented and air-dried pork

Salami (/səˈlɑːmi/ sə-LAH-mee; sing.: salame) is a salume consisting of fermented and air-dried meat, typically pork. Historically, salami was popular among Southern, Eastern, and Central European peasants because it could be stored at room temperature for a period of time once cut, supplementing a potentially meager or inconsistent supply of fresh meat. Countries and regions across Europe make their own traditional varieties of salami.

Small-sized salami are also referred to as salametti or salamini.

== Etymology ==
The word salami in English comes from the plural form of the Italian salame (Italian: [saˈlaːme]). It is a singular or plural word in English for cured meats of a European (particularly Italian) style. In Romanian, Bulgarian, and Turkish, the word is salam; in Macedonian and Serbo-Croatian it is salama; in Hungarian it is szalámi; in Czech it is salám; in Slovak it is saláma; in Russian, Ukrainian, and Belarusian it is salyami; and Polish, French, German, Greek, and Dutch have the same word as English.

The term originates from the word sale (lit. 'salt') with a termination (-ame), which in Italian indicates a collective noun.

== Origin and history ==
Fermentation—allowing beneficial or benign organisms to grow in food to prevent destructive or toxic ones from growing—has been used for thousands of years. Environmental conditions dictate what food processes are used, as seen in the Mediterranean and Southern Europe, where "meat products are dried to lower water activity (Aw) values, taking advantage of the long, dry and sunny days, while in Northern Europe, fermented sausages require smoking for further preservation".

The modern recipe of salami originated in Italy in the early 18th century. It was adopted later in other countries, particularly in Central Europe, with adapted manufacturing procedures. At that time, it was largely consumed by the wealthy, as meat in general was very expensive.

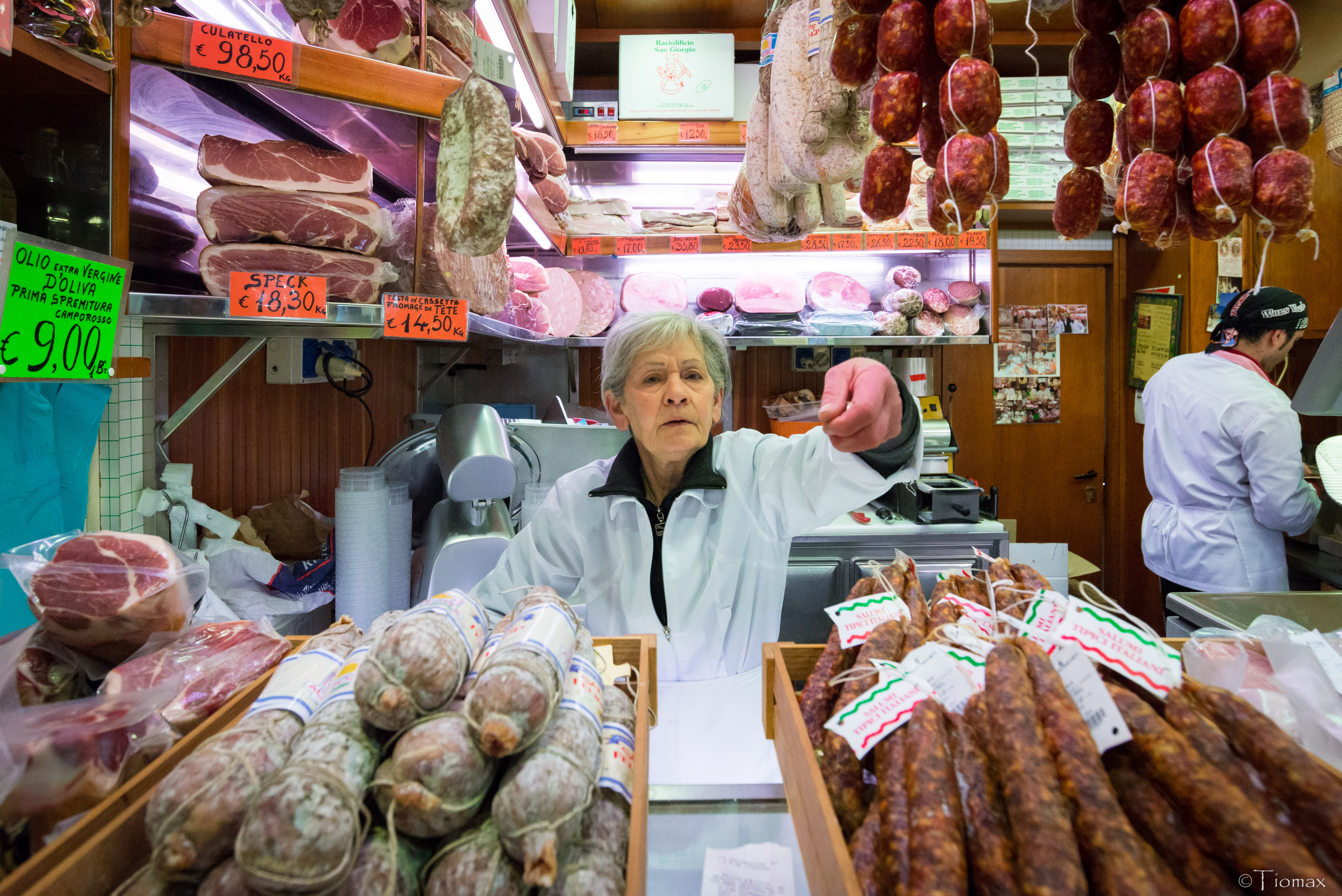
A salami shop in Italy

In Europe, the main countries that produce salami are France, Germany, Hungary, Italy, and Spain, which make several hundred million kilograms per year.

Worldwide, the many different versions of sausage each have their own cultural and flavor profiles. Additionally, each sausage has its own type of seasonings and amount of salt, making each flavor and texture unique. This wide array of fermented sausages, especially in terms of salami, shows its ubiquitous but exclusive nature. For example, due to emigration to North America, European settlers brought many traditions, including fermented meats such as pepperoni. Similar types of sausages are found in the Middle East, where various meats such as beef, lamb, and mutton are used; or in China, where lap cheong (lit. 'preserved sausage') are usually pork.

Likewise, in Central Europe, Hungarian salami is quite popular. Hungarian salami is "intensively smoked, and then its surface is inoculated with mold starters or spontaneous mold growth".

In the United States, National Salami Day is celebrated on September 7 of each year.

== Ingredients ==
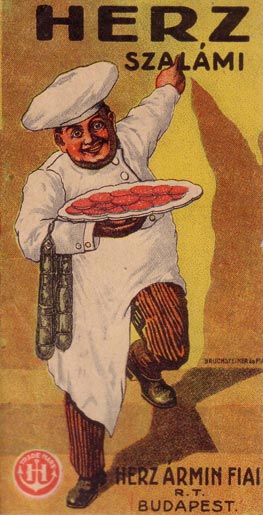
Hungarian Herz Salami poster, an advertisement from Budapest, 1900

A traditional salami, with its typical marbled appearance, is made from beef or pork (sometimes specifically veal). Beef is usual in halal and kosher salami, which never include pork for religious reasons. Makers also use other meats, including venison and poultry (mostly turkey). Goose salami is traditional in parts of northern Italy. Salami has also been made from horse meat. In the Provence region of France and in the Veneto region of Italy donkey meat is used for salami, as well, the product being sold in street markets. Typical additional ingredients include:

- Garlic
- Minced fat
- Salt
- Spices, usually white pepper
- Various herbs
- Vinegar
- Wine

The maker usually ferments the raw meat mixture for a day, then stuffs it into either an edible natural or inedible cellulose casing, and hangs it up to cure. Some recipes apply heat to about 40 °C (104 °F) to accelerate fermentation and drying. Higher temperatures (about 60 °C (140 °F)) stop the fermentation when the salami reaches the desired pH, but the product is not fully cooked (75 °C (167 °F) or higher). Makers often treat the casings with an edible mold (Penicillium) culture. The mold imparts flavor, helps the drying process, and helps prevent spoilage during curing.

== Manufacturing process ==
Salami in casing

Although completely uncooked, salami is not raw, but cured. Salame cotto (lit. 'cooked salami')—typical of the Piedmont region of Italy—is cooked or smoked before or after curing to impart a specific flavor, but not for any benefit of cooking. Before cooking, salame cotto is considered raw and not ready to eat.

Three major stages are involved in the production of salami: preparation of raw materials, fermentation, and ripening and drying. Minor differences in the formulation of the meat or production techniques give rise to the various types of salami across different countries.

=== Preparation ===
Before fermentation, raw meat (usually pork or beef depending on the type of salami that is produced) is ground (usually coarsely) and mixed with other ingredients such as salt, sugar, spices, pepper and, if the particular salami variety requires it, lactic acid bacterial starter culture.

=== Fermentation ===
This mixture is then inserted into casings of the desired size. To achieve the flavor and texture that salami possesses, fermentation, which can also be referred to as a slow acidification process promoting a series of chemical reactions in the meat, has to take place. Direct acidification of meat was found to be inappropriate for salami production, since it causes protein denaturation and an uneven coagulation, thereby causing an undesirable texture in the salami.

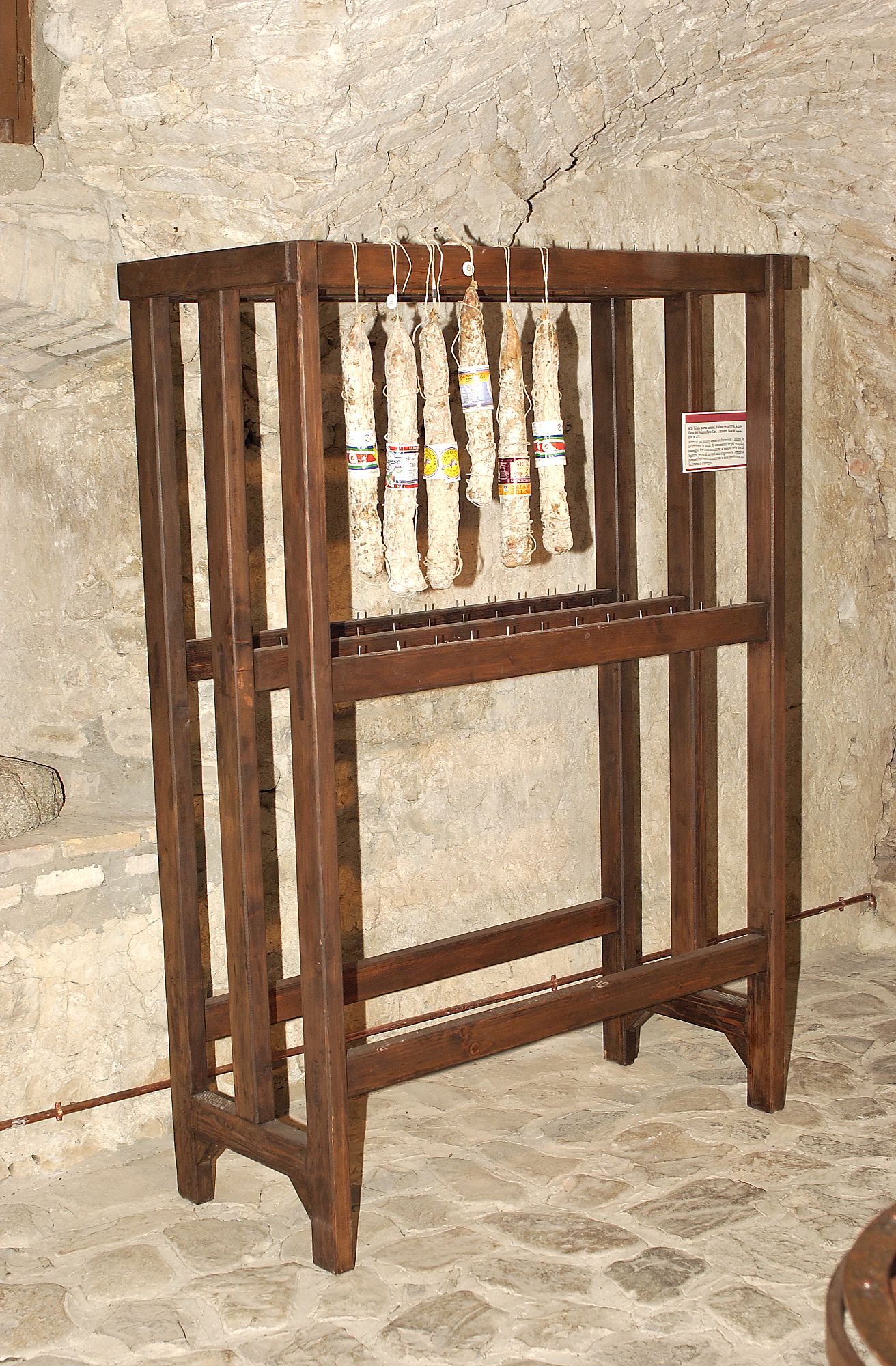
A holder frame used in the manufacture of salami

For a more modern controlled fermentation, makers hang the salami in warm, humid conditions for 1–3 days to encourage the fermenting bacteria to grow, then hang it in a cool, humid environment to slowly dry. In a traditional process, the maker skips the fermentation step and immediately hangs the salami in a cool, humid curing environment. Added sugars (usually dextrose) provide a food source for the curing bacteria.

The bacteria produce lactic acid as a waste product, which lowers the pH and coagulates the proteins, reducing the meat's water-holding capacity. The bacteria-produced acid makes the meat an inhospitable environment for pathogenic bacteria and imparts a tangy flavor that distinguishes salami from machine-dried pork. Salami flavor relies as much on how these bacteria are cultivated as it does on the quality and variety of the other ingredients. Originally, makers introduced wine into the mix, favouring the growth of other beneficial bacteria. Now, they use starter cultures.

The climate of the curing environment, casing size, and style determine the drying and curing process. According to the particular variety of salami, different fermentation methods involving different acids have been explored to create various colors and flavors. Starter cultures, such as lactic acid bacteria (LAB) and coagulase-negative cocci (CNC), such as specific strains of Staphylococcus xylosus or Micrococcus, are most commonly used in salami production. More species of LAB and CNC were discovered during recent decades and they were found to have different fermentation temperatures with variable rates of acidification. Despite the fact that these bacteria can help maintain a longer shelf life for meat products and even retard the growth of pathogens, there are a few studies that argue some starter cultures may be related to the production of enterotoxins or biogenic amines that can be harmful to the human body. Therefore, starter cultures have to be carefully selected by producers and properly used in fermentation.

=== Drying ===
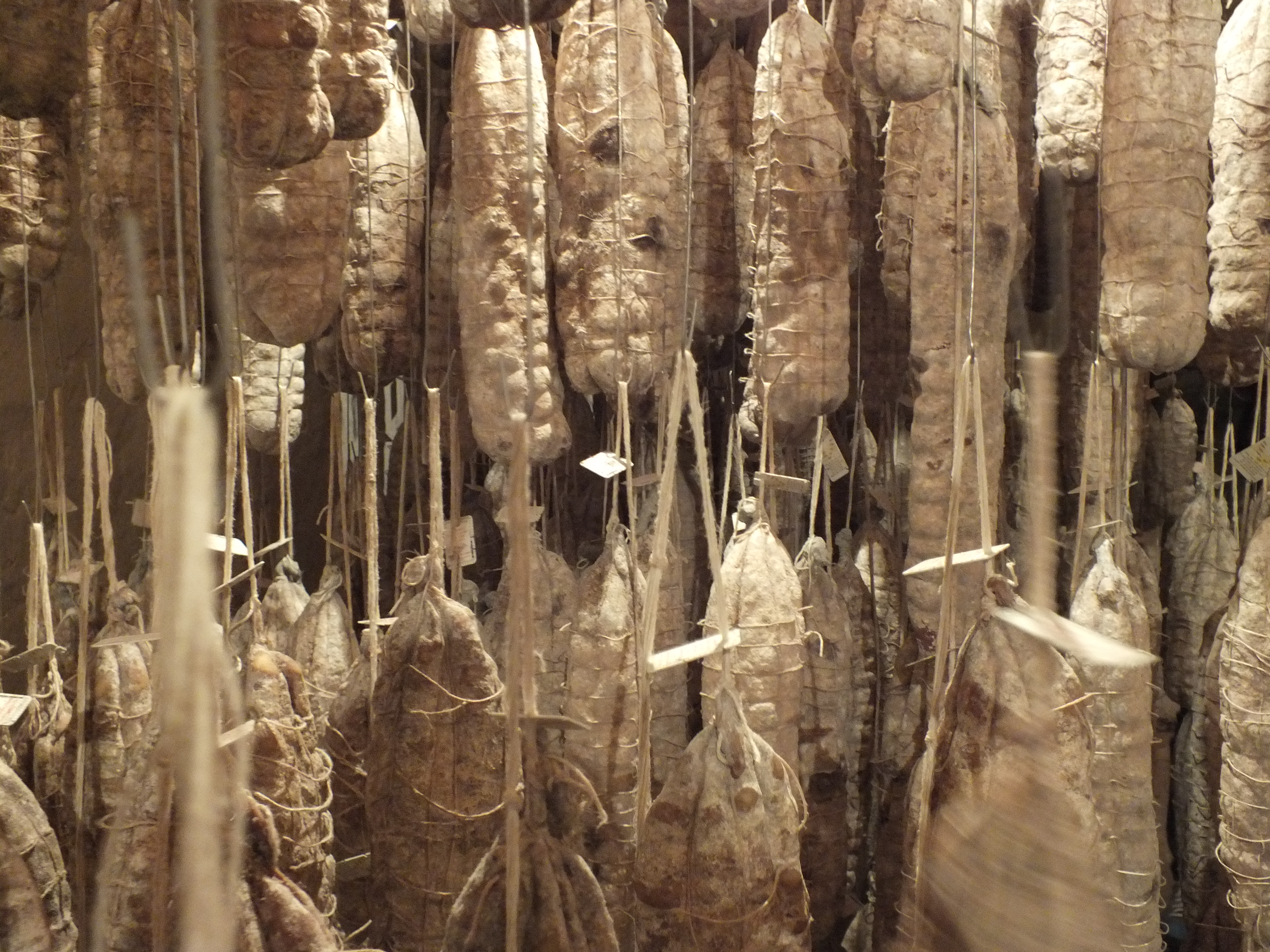
Salami aging in a cellar

After fermentation, the sausage must be dried. This changes the casings from water-permeable to reasonably airtight. A white covering of either mold or flour helps prevent photo-oxidation of the meat and rancidity in the fat.

Ripening and drying happens after fermentation. This stage causes the main physical and microbial changes through the large amount of water loss. About half of the water is evaporated and further water loss has to be prevented by packaging. Nonuniform drying processes could cause the formation of a hard shell on the surface of salami. This is similar to other food products such as fruits that undergo dehydration to decrease the risk of diseases or spoilage-causing microbial growth. In modern manufacturing temperature and relative humidity are strictly controlled according to the size of the salami.

Nitrates or nitrites may be added to provide additional color and inhibit growth of harmful bacteria from the genus Clostridium. Salt, acidity, nitrate/nitrite levels, and dryness of the fully cured salami combine to make the uncooked meat safe to consume. High quality, fresh ingredients are important to helping prevent deadly microorganisms and toxins from developing.

== Properties ==
The quality of salami is dependent on the quality of the raw materials and the level of technology used in its production. The aroma and taste of salami are developed by enzymatic and non-enzymatic reactions. The characteristic fermented meat flavor is believed to be developed by a combination of endogenous enzymatic activities and the lactic acid produced by the starter culture. Lactic acid bacteria develop the tangy flavor of salami through the fermentation of carbohydrates and produces an appealing red color to the meat after fermentation, while coagulase-negative cocci can catabolize amino acids and fatty acids to produce volatile compounds. The flavor itself consists of odour properties, which comes from volatile substances, and taste and tactile properties, which comes from non-volatile substances that are a result of enhancers and synergists.

When smoke is applied to salami, it also affects the taste, smell, appearance, and texture. Some of these changes are due to the formation of phenolic compounds, which slow fat oxidation. The pyrolysis of cellulose and hemicelluloses in the salami casing produces carbonyls, which develop the color of the meat.

More than 400 volatile compounds have been identified in different types of dry-fermented sausages. For example, the organic compounds identified in Hungarian salami produced the dominant flavors of smokiness, sweetness, pungency, sourness, and cloves; secondary flavors included cooked meat, cheese, popcorn, cooked potato, mushroom, seasoning, phenols, roasting, sulfur, and sweatiness. Some minor flavors included malt, garlic, fruit, pine, grass, citrus, honey, caramel, and vanilla. The overall smoky note is the result of numerous phenols. Whether these odorants are formed in the salami or simply transferred from the raw materials during manufacturing is unknown; systematic studies have yet to compare the odorants present in the raw materials to those in the final product.

== Shelf life ==
Salami will remain stable for long periods of time, as it has a low water activity and contains preservatives, colorings, flavorings, antioxidants and acidifying cultures. Semi-ripened salami will maintain its flavor for a long time under retail display conditions, but it will eventually deteriorate due to the development of incipient rancidity. The shelf life of salami is mainly determined by sensory deterioration, which is the result of various oxidation phenomena; pathogenic or spoilage bacteria do not readily proliferate in dry-cured sausage. The main cause of flavor deterioration in dry-cured sausage is rancidity, although the possible formation of other off-flavors, such as mouldy, acid, putrid or pungent traits, may contribute to the decreased quality.

The use of coriander essential oil in salami has been shown to increase the higher synthetic antioxidant effect of butylated hydroxytoluene, which delays lipid oxidation and the rancid aroma and taste that come with it. Additionally, salami with coriander essential oil shows improvements in the sensory attributes of taste, odor, texture, brightness, and red color intensity.

== Varieties ==
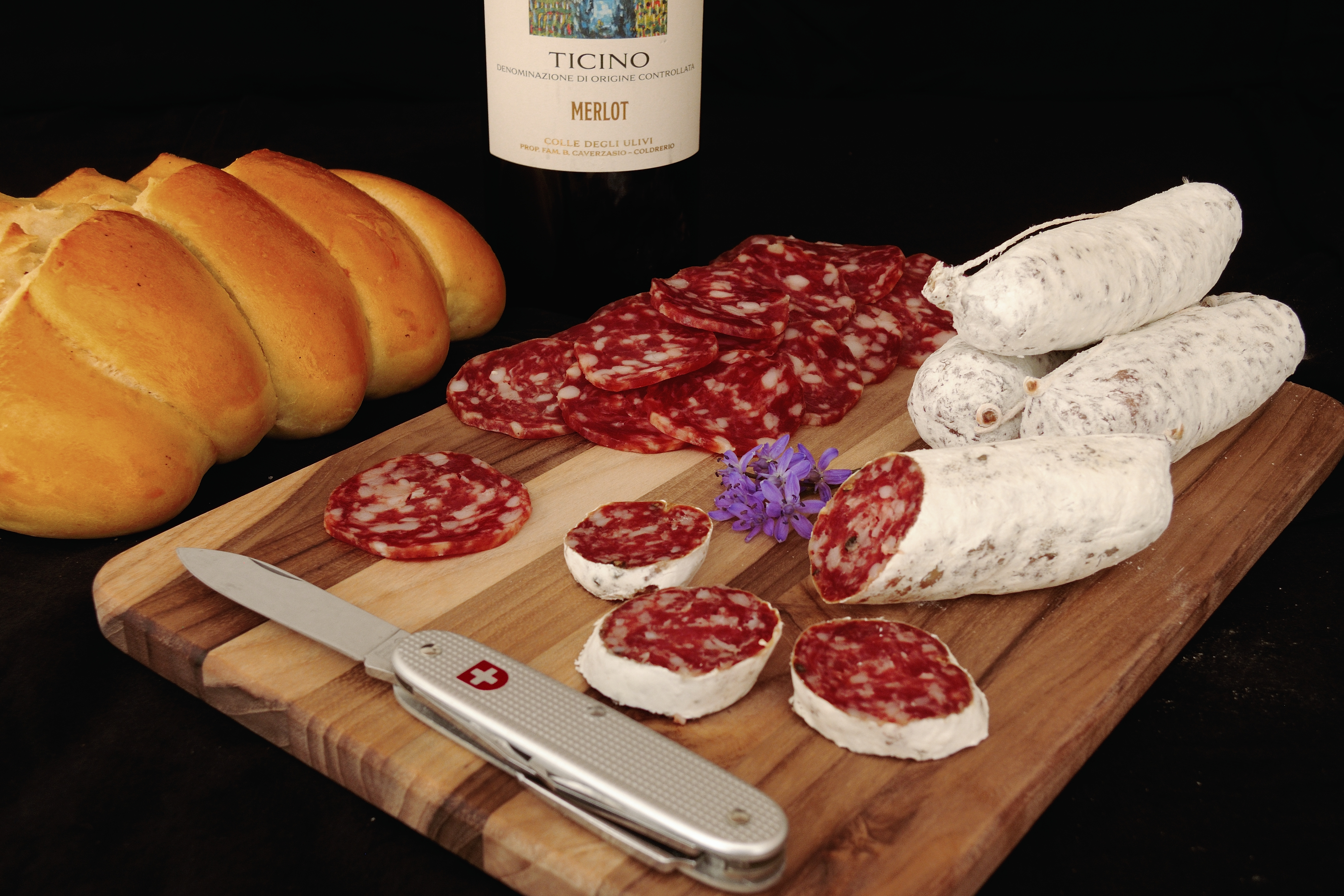
Ticinese salami and salametti

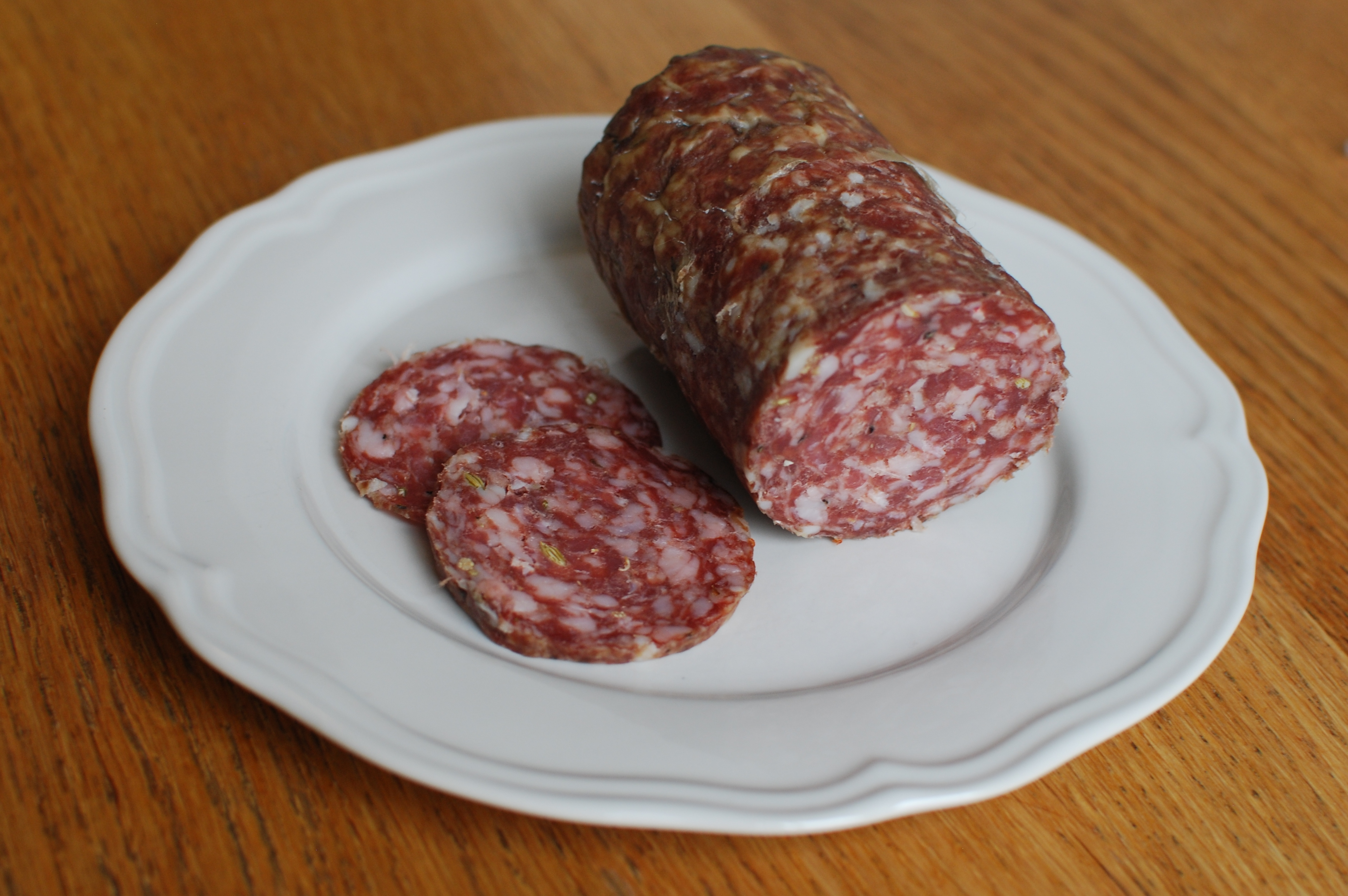
Finocchiona

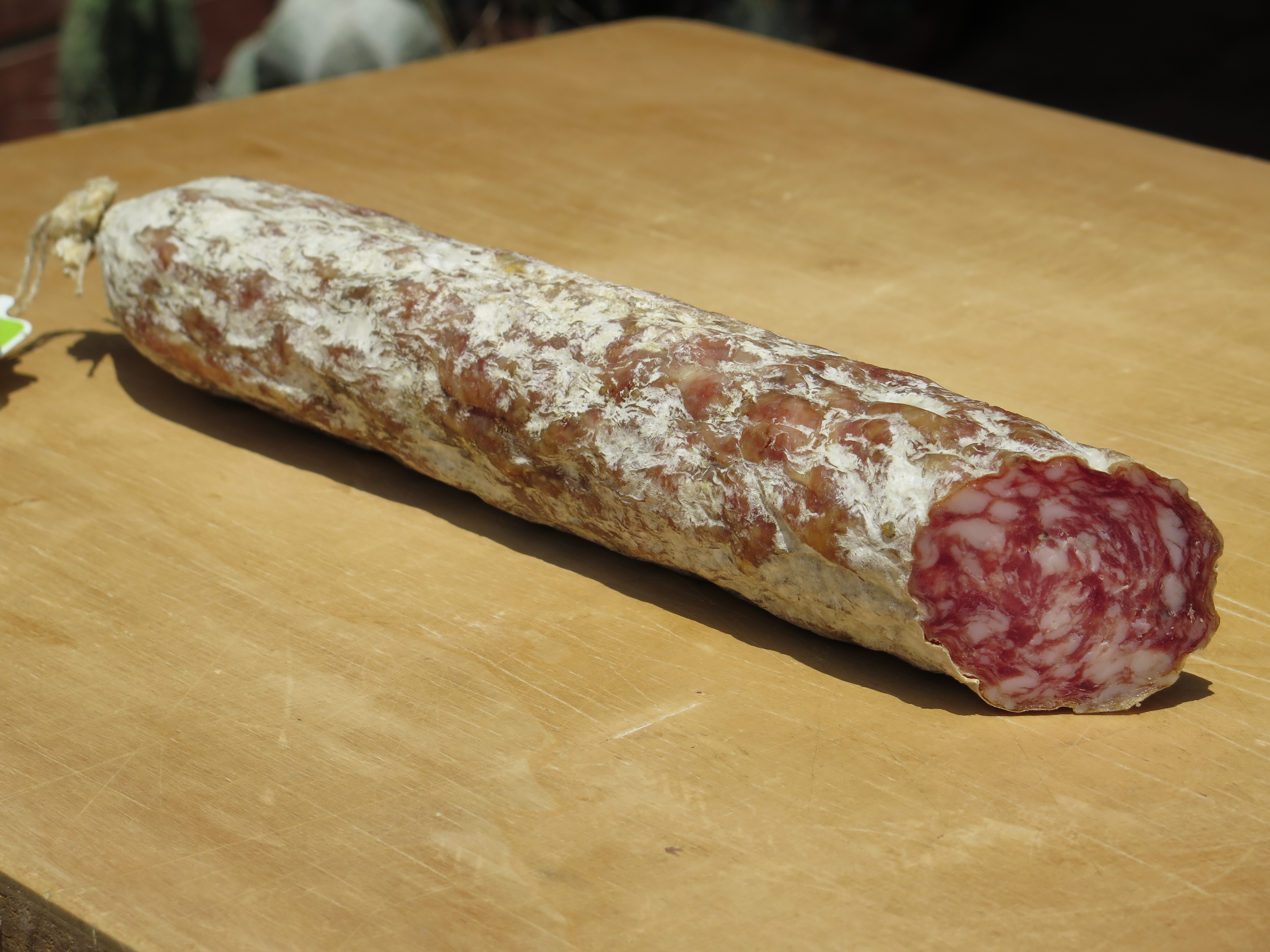
Salame friulano

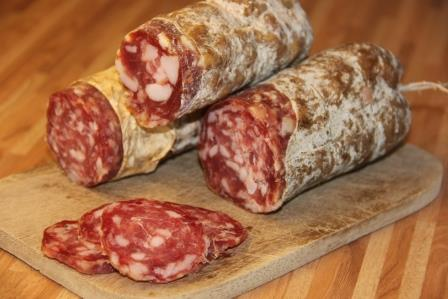
Assorted Italian salami

Salami (sing.: salame) varieties from Italian-speaking regions include:

- Cacciatore (or cacciatora)
- Ciauscolo
- Felino
- Finocchiona
- Genovese di Sant'Olcese
- 'Nduja
- Soppressata
- Strolghino
- Ticinese (also called salame nostrano)

Other salami varieties include:

- Pepperoni
- Sibiu Salami
- Winter salami

Many Old World salami are named after their region or country of origin—such as Genoa and Hungarian salami, and salame Milano. Many are flavored with garlic. Some types—including some varieties from Hungary (pick salami), and Italy (such as Neapolitan varieties that led to American pepperoni) include paprika or chili powder. Varieties also differ by coarseness or fineness of the chopped meat and size and style of the casing.

Naples-type salami is also a popular southern Italian dry fermented sausage made of coarsely minced pork meat. In northeast Italy, traditional dry fermented salami sausages made of fresh pork display unique organoleptic sensory profiles characterized by accented acidity, slight sourness, and elastic semi hard consistency. Other popular dry salamis in Italy are mainly made from a combination of pork and small bits of beef, seasoned with garlic; pepperoni is also made of pork and beef, and is usually smoked; chorizo is highly spiced and smoked.

Hungarian-type salami is a specialty in salami production, because it is first slightly smoked and mold-ripened afterward. Szegedi téliszalámi, a Hungarian winter salami, is made of raw pork, bacon, salt, spices, sugars, and sodium nitrite. The Mangalitsa pork breed, with equine large intestine used as its casing to preserve and serve it. This type acquires a grey mold cover on it and has a firm texture and excellent keeping quality after a 30% weight loss reached in 3 to 4 months.

Dry fermented sausage (salami aeros) is an important product of the Greek meat industry with an annual production of about 10,000 tons. Its manufacture varies depending on the skill and experience of the meat manufacturer rather than a process solely based on scientific and technological means of production. This type of traditional sausage, which undergoes spontaneous fermentation, is of superior quality compared to those inoculated with starters and made at industrial scale. This type of traditional salami is often more expensive due to its high quality.

In Germany, Westphalian salami is made with fast technology from pork meat, pepper, garlic, and sometimes mustard seeds, and is a smoked, firm, sliceable product with a distinctly fermented/sour flavor. The sausages are stuffed into large-diameter casings and ripened by lowering the temperature from 24 °C to 12–14 °C until a water loss of 25% is obtained.

In the Netherlands, the most popular Dutch products are finely chopped salami, Cervelat, Snijworst (with high fat content and rind added), Boerenmetworst (which is coarsely chopped), and chorizo (which is less spicy than the Spanish product).

In Russia, typical products are Moscow-type and Russian-type salamis made from pork and beef meat. A particular feature of Moscow-type salami is the large size of fat particles (7–8 mm) that give the sausage a rough cover.

== Health effects ==
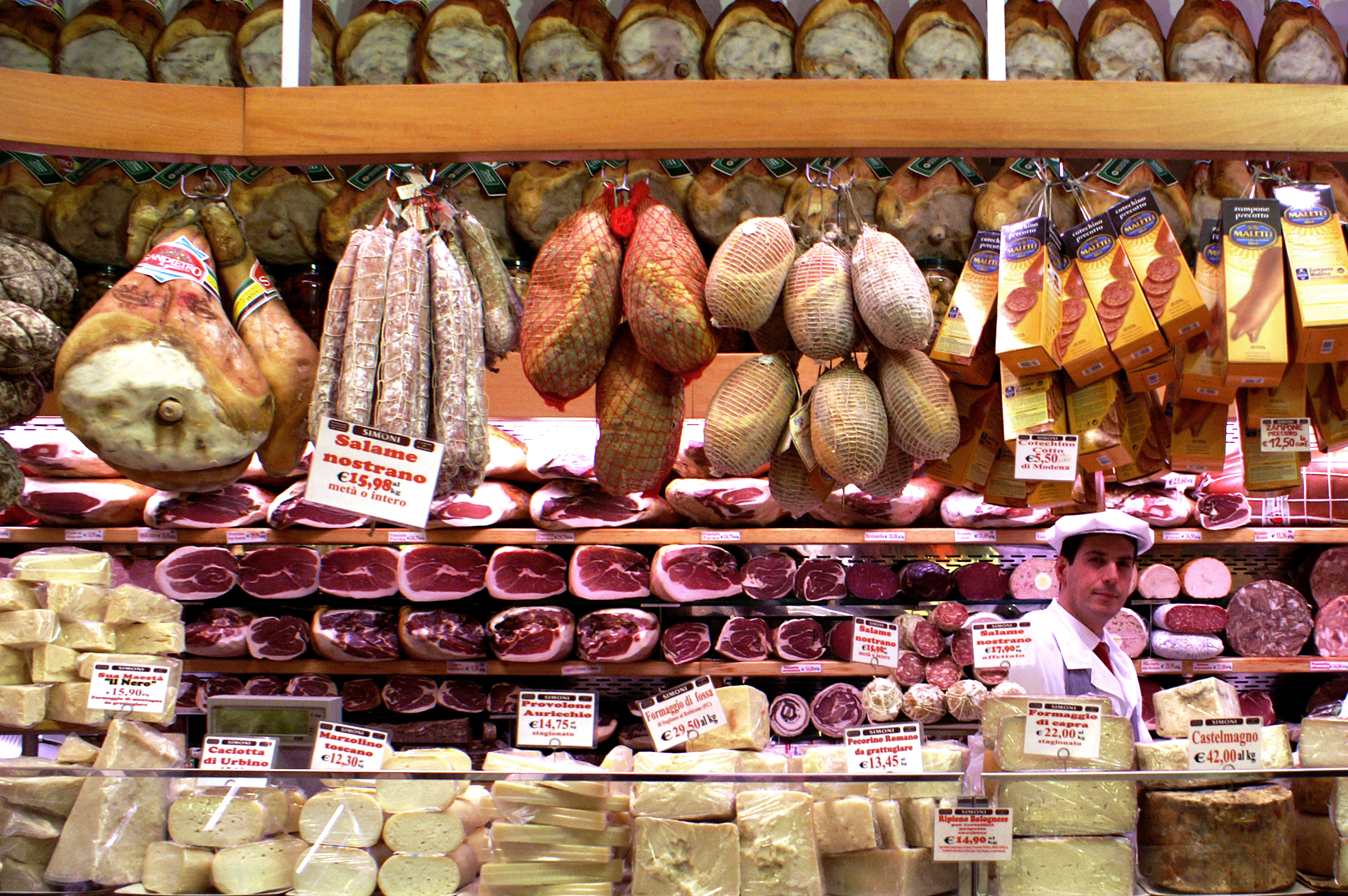
Salami (like other salumi) are very high in saturated fat.

Salami has been found to be a possible allergen to some people due to the use of penicillium species mold starter during the drying and curing portion of processing to add flavor and stop growth of undesirable molds. These molds occur predominantly in the skin of salami.

Fermented pork back fat that is used to make salami has very high saturated fatty acid and cholesterol content, which are believed to be risk factors for cardiovascular disease. However, it has been shown that it is possible to replace the pork back fat in salami with extra virgin olive oil, thereby changing the fatty acid profile of the salami. Olive oil contains far more monounsaturated and polyunsaturated fatty acids, so this substitution purportedly creates a more healthful product. Salami is considered slightly acidic due to lactic acid that is present. Salami where extra virgin olive oil was substituted for the pork back fat has been shown to have a lower pH of around 5.00 compared to its original levels of around 6.35 to 6.55, making the salami more acidic. These lower pH levels are healthier for humans as higher populations of lactic acid bacteria inhibit the spread of spoilage microorganisms.

In 1994, there was an outbreak of Escherichia coli O157 with 17 cases all occurring from the consumption of pre-sliced salami that was processed by one company. A research investigation of the factory where the salami was processed found that all processing techniques and production methods complied with all regulations, and there was no evidence of contamination after processing.

Preservation of any meat products is important. Some fungi can create undesirable color and flavor in the contaminated meat and produce toxins. Some fungi that are not harmful to humans, such as those that are formed on the surface of dried salami, are an indication of maturation after ripening. Thus, producers have to eliminate fungi that have potential risks to human health. As natural preservatives are becoming more desirable food additives than artificial preservatives in food industries, some studies about salami have been focusing on the use of essential oils, such as oregano and clove oil, as preservatives that can be applied to salami production due to their anti-fungal activities. Several types of oils, including rosemary, clove, oregano and sage oils, were found to have different levels of inhibitory effect to various types of fungi that could possibly grow on salami. Since several of these oils contain volatile compounds whose amount can affect the flavor of the food, researchers often perform a sensory test to find the amount of the oil that can best serve as an anti-fungal preservative but have the least effect on the flavor or appearance of the salami.

== See also ==
Media related to Salami at Wikimedia Commons

- List of dried foods
- List of smoked foods
- List of sausages
- Salchichón and chorizo – two similar families of pork sausages from the Iberian Peninsula
- Saucisson – a similar family of pork sausages from the French-speaking world
- Salami slicing tactics
