= Saucisson =

Dry-cured sausage

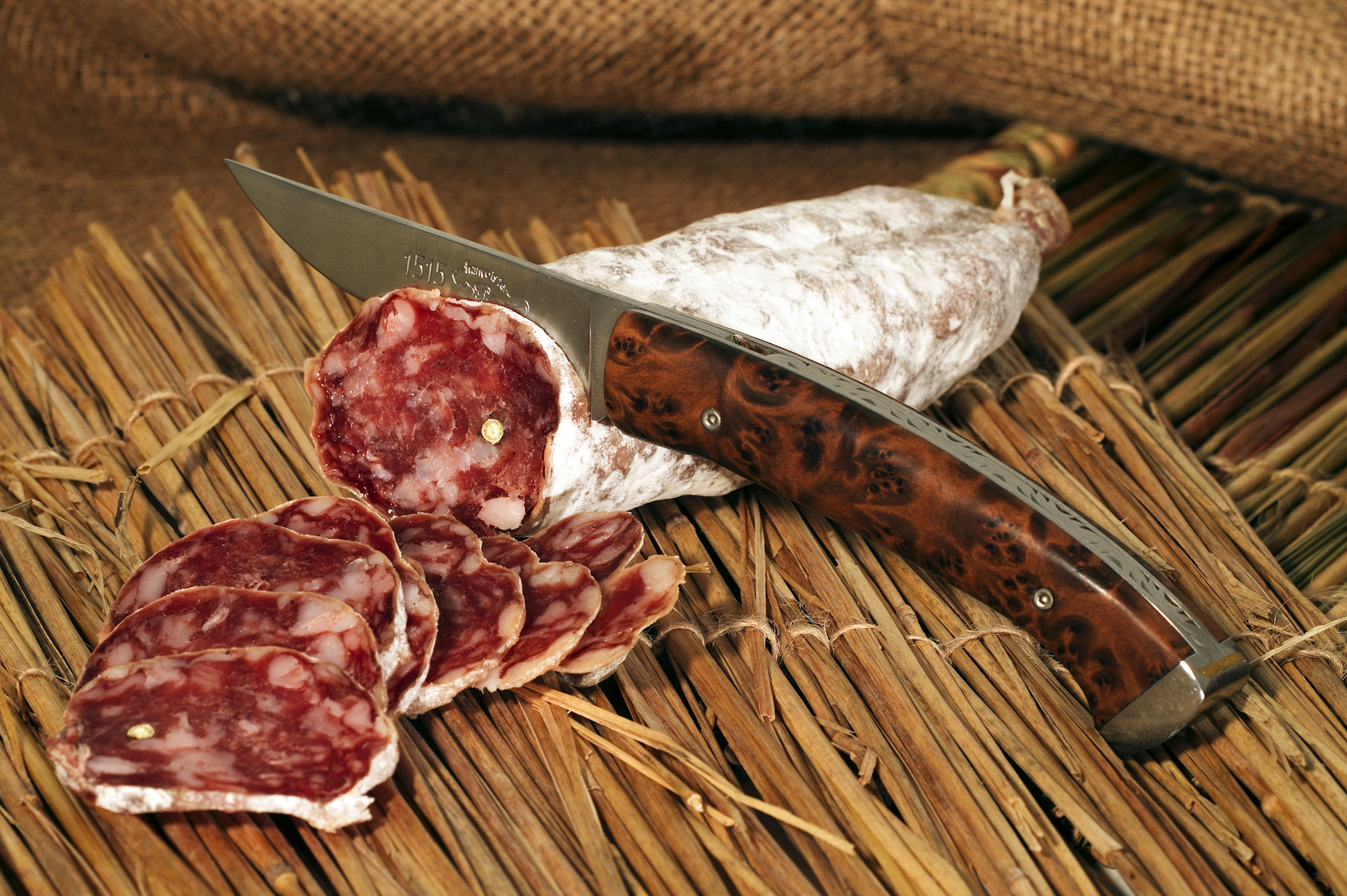
- Sliced saucisson
- Alternative names: Saucisse sèche
- Course: Sausage
- Place of origin: France
- Main ingredients: Pork

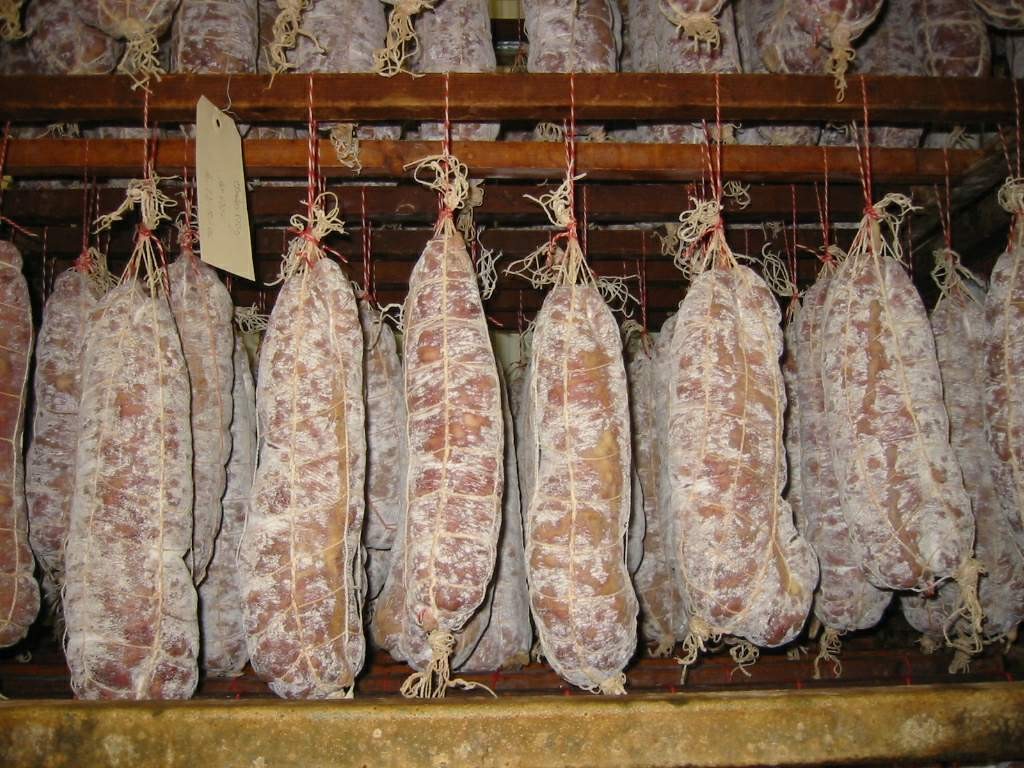
Saucisson hanging to dry

Saucisson (French: [sosisɔ̃]), also saucisson sec or saucisse sèche, is a family of thick, dry-cured sausage-shaped charcuterie in French cuisine. Typically made of pork, or a mixture of pork and other meats, saucisson are similar to salami.

There is also a tradition of making saucisse sèche in western Switzerland, the term saucisson being used only for sausages with interrupted maturation, therefore cooking sausages.

== Origin ==
Saucisson comes from the Latin salsus meaning salted. The Celtic peoples were renowned for preparing all types of cured meats, particularly sausages. The fame of Gallic charcuterie was such that it was exported to Rome and the rest of the Roman Empire.

The word saucisson first appeared in France in 1546 in the Tiers Livre of Rabelais.

== Production ==
=== Stuffing ===
Saucisson stuffing is generally made of two-thirds to three-quarters lean meat and the rest fat (largely pork back-fat called bardière). The mixture is ground to different fineness depending on the type of saucisson and mixed with salt, sugar, spices, nitrites or saltpeter, and with fermenting bacteria. For instance, antilisterial strains of Lactobacillus sakei are used in Europe for the production of saucisson and can be used for the conservation of fresh meat.

Some versions of saucisson also contain pepper seeds, garlic, mushrooms, bits of dried fruits or nuts (such as pistachios, walnuts, figs, or olives), cheeses such as Roquefort, Laguiole, or alcohols such as wines or Génépi liquor.

== See also ==
- List of sausages
- Saucisson de Lyon
- Salchichón, similar from Spain
