= Finocchiona =

Italian pork and fennel salami

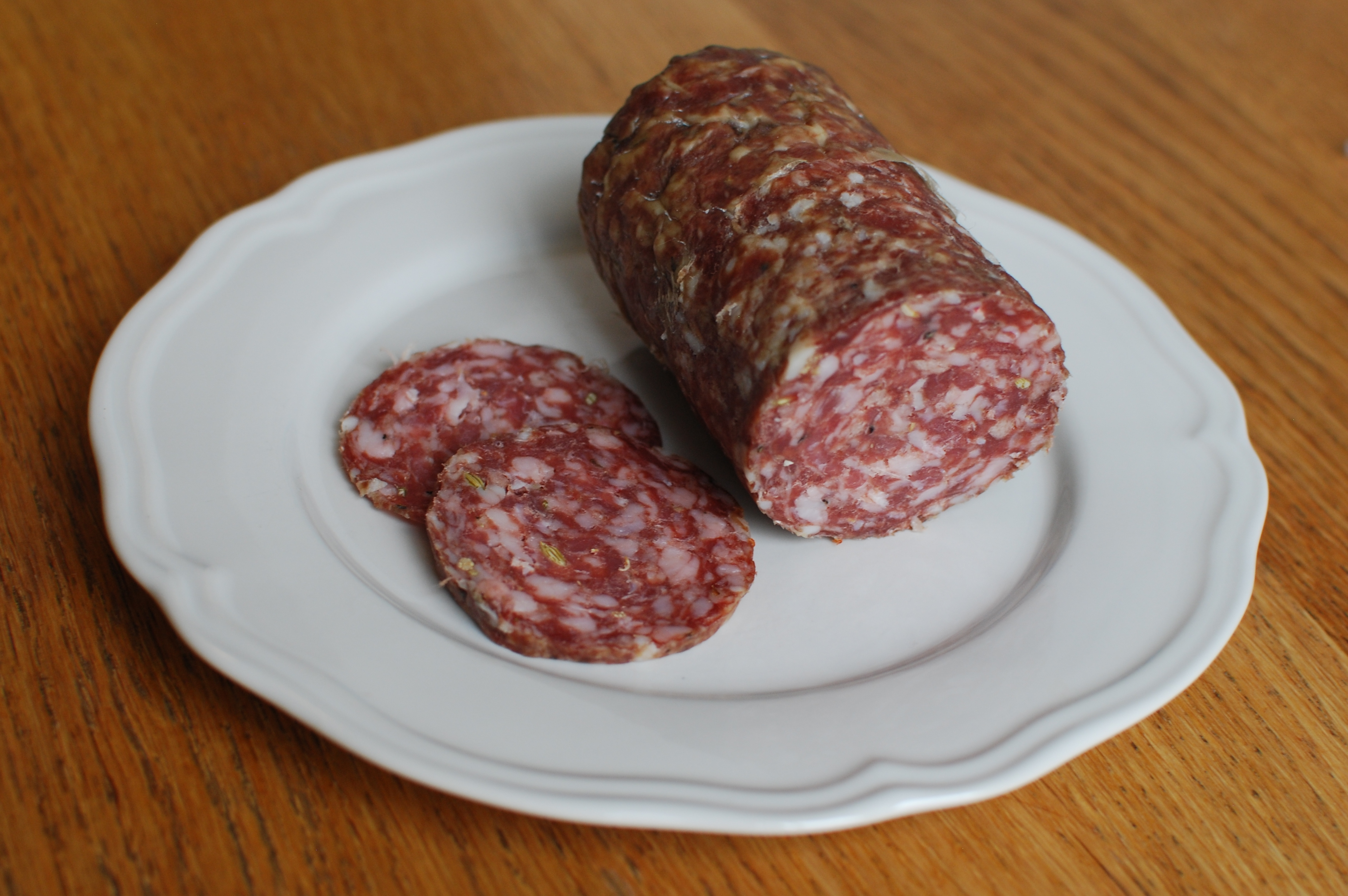
Finocchiona

Finocchiona (Italian: [finokˈkjoːna]) is a salami variety, typical of Florence, Italy. It is characterized by the use of fennel.

== Origins ==
Finocchiona originated in the Renaissance, and possibly even before, in the Late Middle Ages. The use of fennel was an alternative to pepper (a key ingredient of the standard salami), which was very expensive at the time, while fennel grew wild and abundant in the Tuscan countryside. Also, fennel is rich in menthol, and because of its anesthetic qualities, finocchiona was regularly offered by the winemakers of the Chianti area to their customers before tasting their lower quality wines to mask their taste. Its name derives from finocchio, the Italian name for fennel.

== Preparation ==
Finocchiona's ingredients are chopped pork meat (generally cheek, shoulder, or belly), fennel seeds, red wine, salt, and pepper stuffed into intestines. It is fermented and then dried for not less than five months.

A variant, sbriciolona, is prepared with a coarser grind, and undergoes a shorter drying (not more than a month). This product has to be cut into larger slices than the typical finocchiona and is consumed using a fork and a knife because it tends to crumble.
