= Saucisson de Lyon =

Pork sausage in Lyonnaise cuisine

Saucisson de Lyon (French: [sosisɔ̃ də ljɔ̃]) is a large cured pork sausage (saucisson sec) in Lyonnaise cuisine. It sometimes includes some beef or a liqueur.

It is similar to other large French cured sausages, such as those of Arles, Lorraine, and Burgundy.

== See also ==
- List of sausages
