= Genoa salami =

American variety of salami

Genoa salami is an American variety of dry, cured, unsmoked salami. It is normally made from coarsely ground pork, but may also contain a small amount of beef and has a natural casing. Under US regulations, it must have a moisture to protein ratio of no more than 2.3:1, as contrasted with dry or hard salami, which are limited to 1.9:1.

The name Genoa salami denotes the style of preparation rather than geographical origin.

== See also ==
- Salame genovese di Sant'Olcese – a salume from the Italian city of Genoa made of pork and beef
