= Salchichón =

Spanish summer sausage

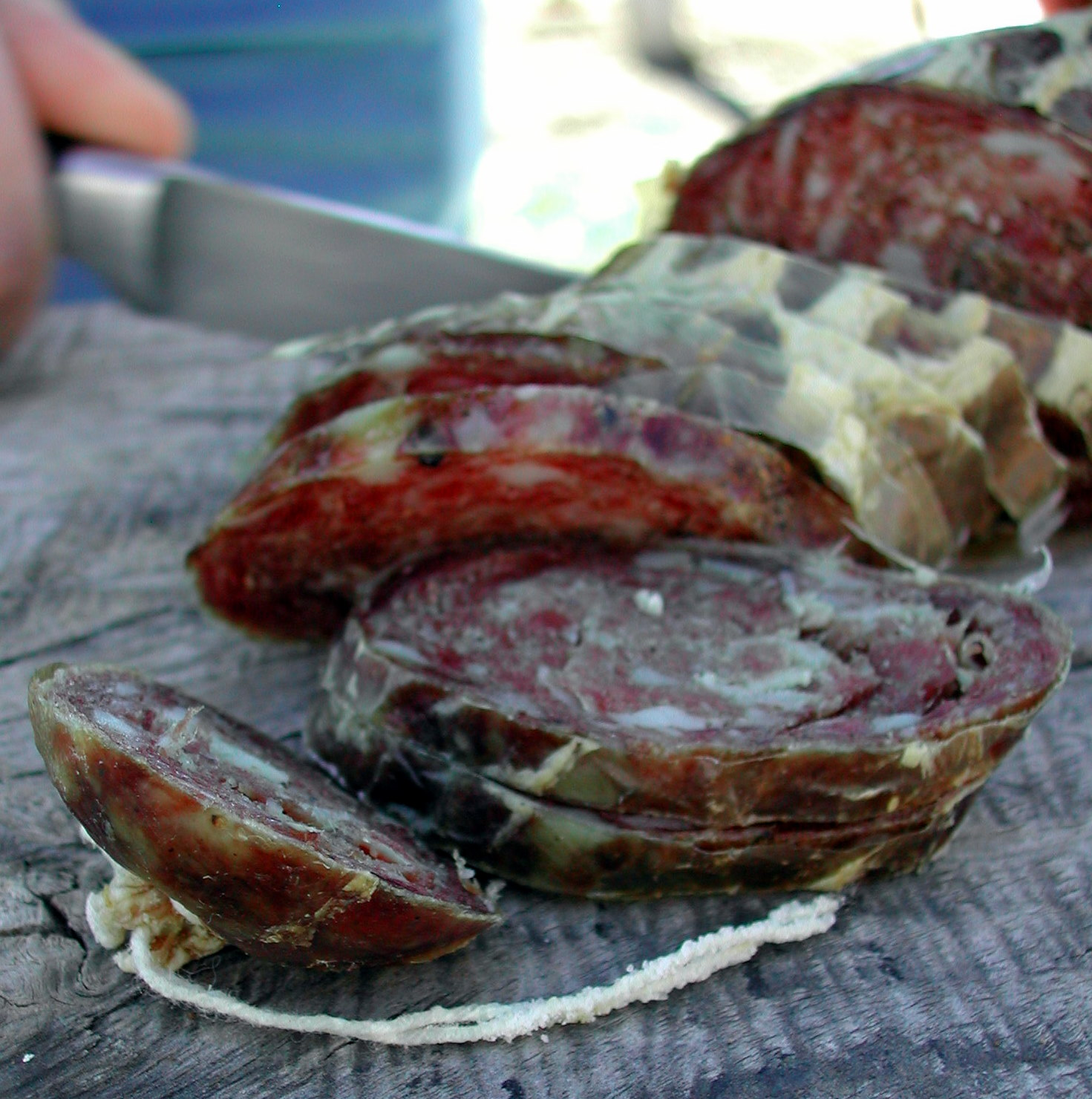
- Wild boar salchichón
- Course: Sausage
- Place of origin: Spanish
- Main ingredients: pork, salt, pepper, nutmeg, oregano, and garlic

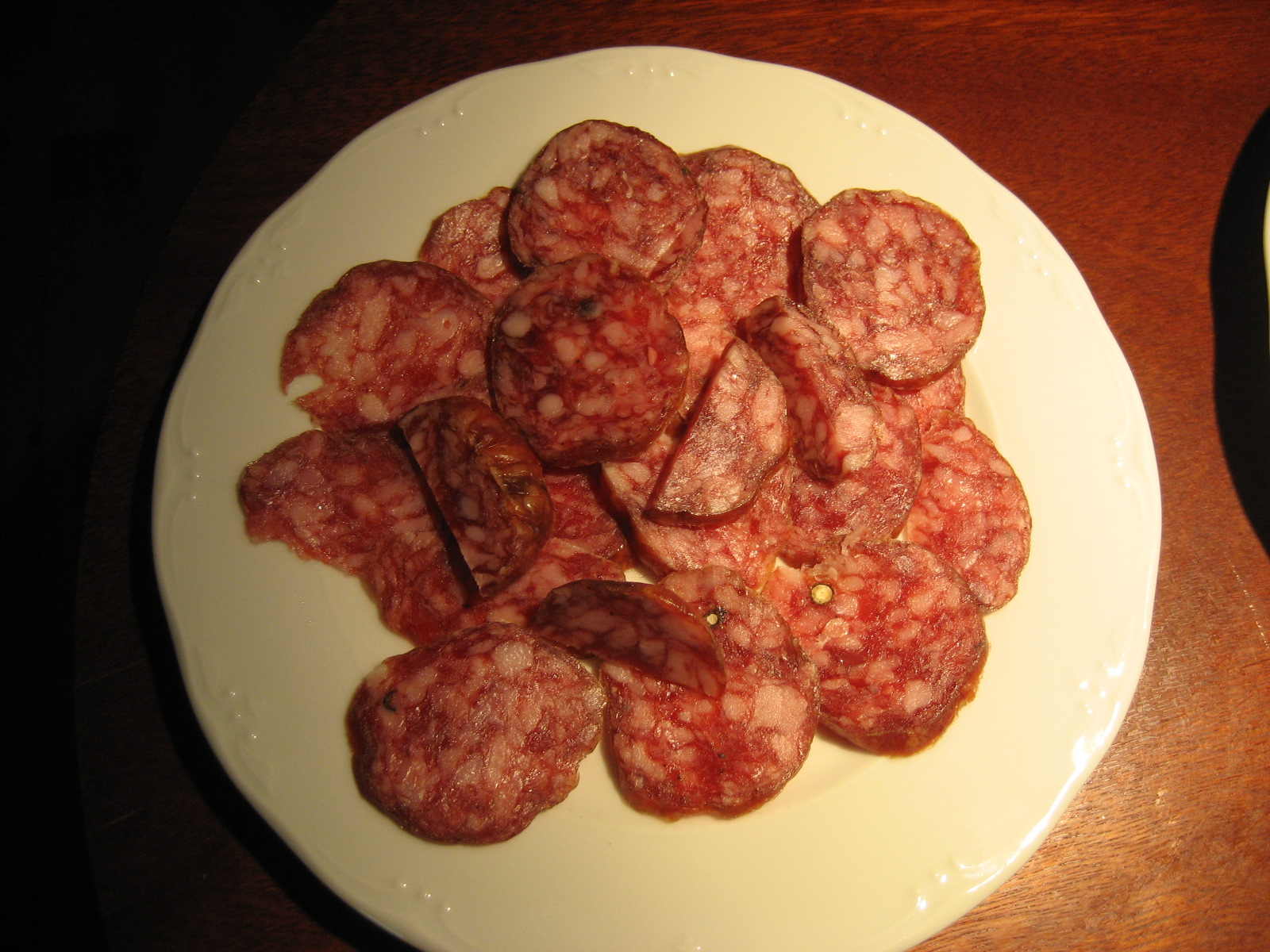
Sliced salchichón

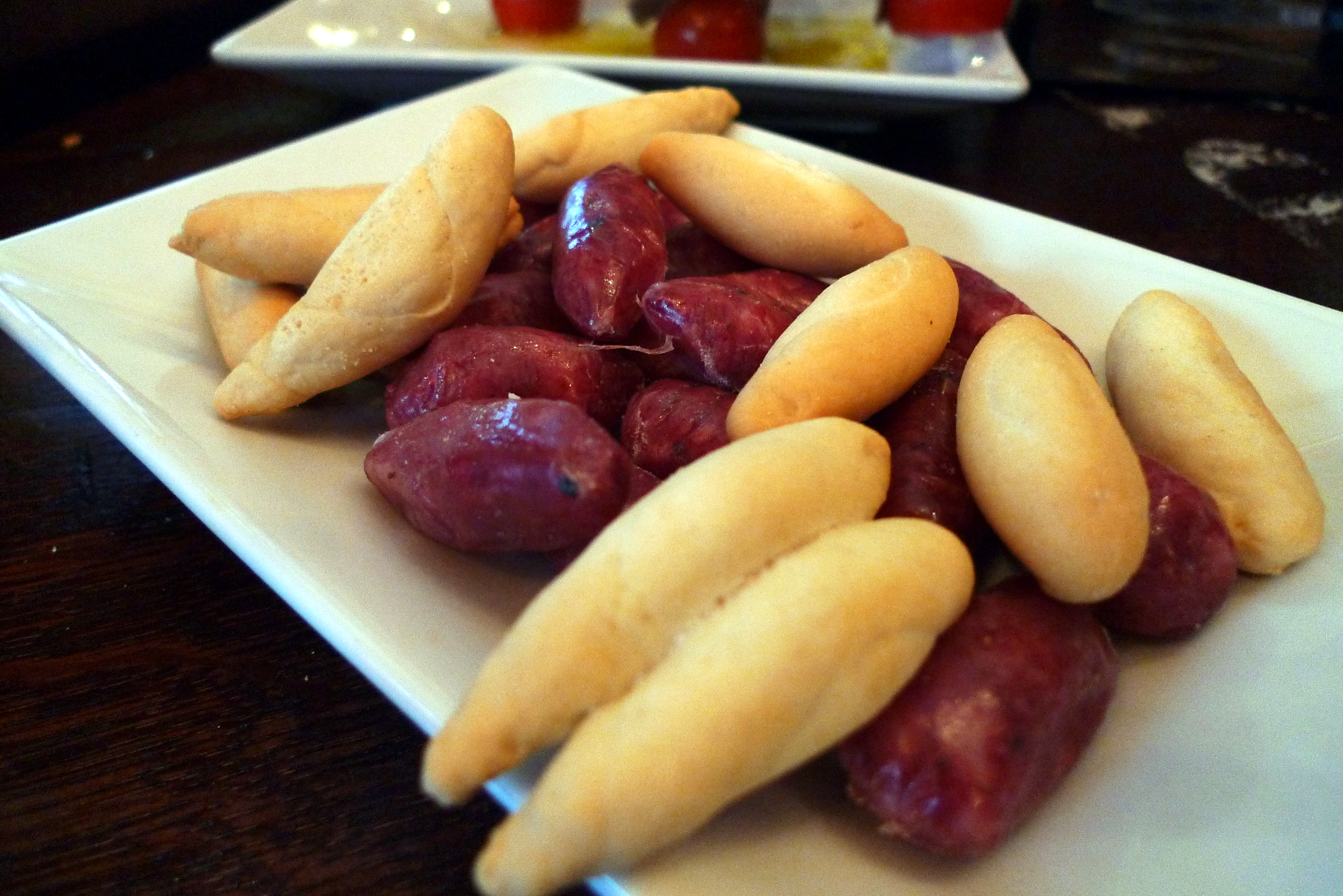
Picos ibéricos of Jabugo: salchichón sausage served with bread sticks

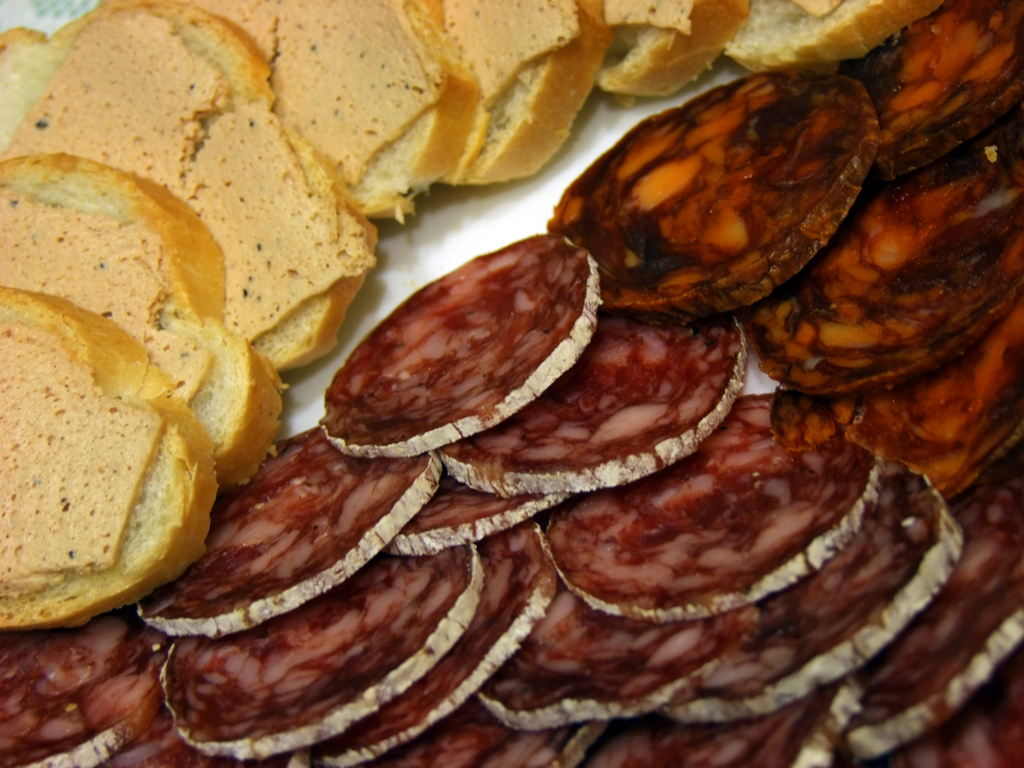
Left to right: pâté de Ibérico, salchichón, and chorizo

Salchichón is a Spanish summer sausage that is made by smoking, drying, cooking, or some combination. It is made with pork, although some recipes use other meats including ox, veal, or horse.

== Preparation ==
The meat and fat are chopped in thin bits, seasoned with salt, pepper, nutmeg, oregano, and garlic, and then inserted in thick natural pork intestines. Curing can be done for up to three months.

== Regional variations ==
In Puerto Rico, salchichón is a smoked summer sausage similar in some ways to Genoa salami, an unsmoked Italian dry sausage. The salami is made of beef liver, heart, tripe, and pork fat and meat. It is often seasoned with salt, vinegar, whole black peppercorns, and smoked paprika.

== See also ==
- Saucisson, a similar sausage from France
- Chorizo, a similar food
