= Salame genovese di Sant'Olcese =

Salami of pork and beef from Genoa, Italy

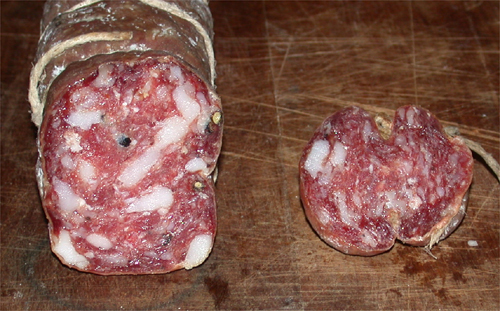
- Place of origin: Italy
- Region or state: Sant'Olcese, Liguria

Salame genovese di Sant'Olcese is a variety of salume produced in the comune (municipality) of Sant'Olcese, Liguria. It consists of coarsely ground pork and beef in equal proportions and is aged for two to three months.

== History ==
Salame genovese di Sant'Olcese was first produced in Orero, part of the comune of Serra Riccò that until 1877 was part of Sant'Olcese. Industrial production began in the beginning of the 19th century. As of 2010 there were two producers of this salami.

== See also ==
- Genoa salami – an American salami
