= Winter salami =

Type of Hungarian salami

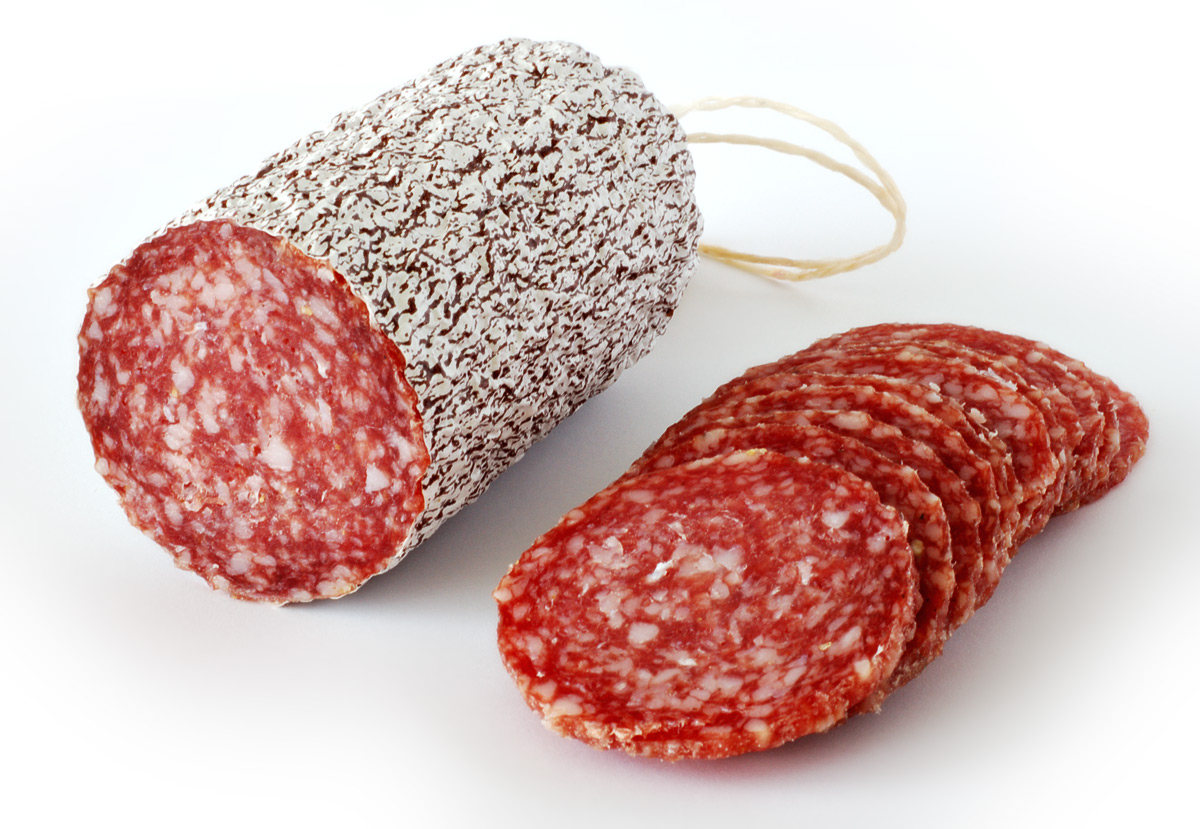
- Téliszalámi

Winter salami (Hungarian: téliszalámi) is a type of Hungarian salami produced according to a centuries-old tradition. Made from pork and spices (white pepper, allspice, and others), winter salami is cured in cold air and smoked slowly. During the dry ripening process, a special noble-mold is formed on the casing surface.

Winter salami was first pioneered and popularized in Hungary by a wave of Friulian seasonal entrepreneurs and butchers in the second half of the nineteenth century, including József Meduna di Montecucco's "first Hungarian steamed salami and fat products" factory.

Szegedi téliszalámi (winter salami of Szeged) gained European Union PDO status in 2007, followed by Budapesti téliszalámi, which gained PGI status in 2009. The Hungarian Ministry of Agriculture and Rural Development places many specific regulations on what can be called Szeged winter salami.

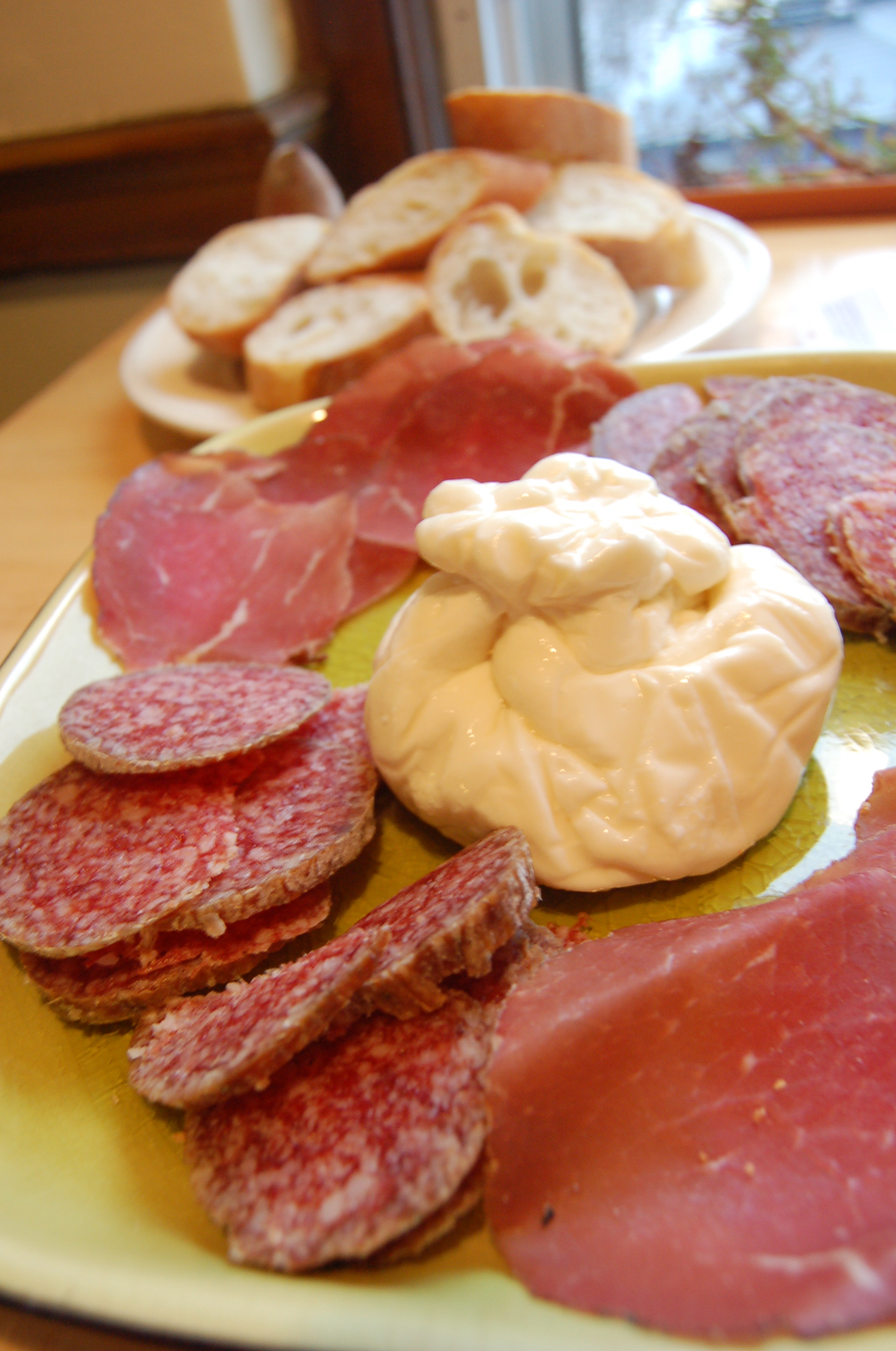
Cold plate with Hungarian wintersalami and bacon

== See also ==
- List of dried foods
- List of sausages
- List of smoked foods
