= Sai krok pla naem =

Traditional Thai dish

- Place of origin: Thailand
- Main ingredients: grilled fermented pork, rice sausage

Sai krok pla naem (Thai: ไส้กรอกปลาแนม, pronounced [sâj krɔ̀ːk plā nɛ̄ːm]) is a traditional Thai dish consisting of grilled fermented pork or rice sausage served with pla naem, a finely minced and seasoned fish relish. The relish is typically made from freshwater fish such as common snakehead, mixed with roasted rice powder, pork, and citrus juice, giving it a tangy, savory flavor. It is usually eaten wrapped in lettuce with fresh chilies, in a style known in Thai as naem (to accompany with condiments). The dish is believed to date back to the reign of King Rama II (early 19th century), a period noted for its rich culinary culture, as reflected in the royal poem Kap He Chom Khrueang Khao Wan, which praises a variety of savory and sweet dishes. Today, it is considered a relatively rare dish and is mostly found in long-standing traditional markets such as Nang Loeng Market, Banglamphu, and Talat Phlu.

== See also ==
- Sai krok
- Sai krok Isan
- Sakhu sai mu
