= Shark meat =

Seafood consisting of the flesh of sharks

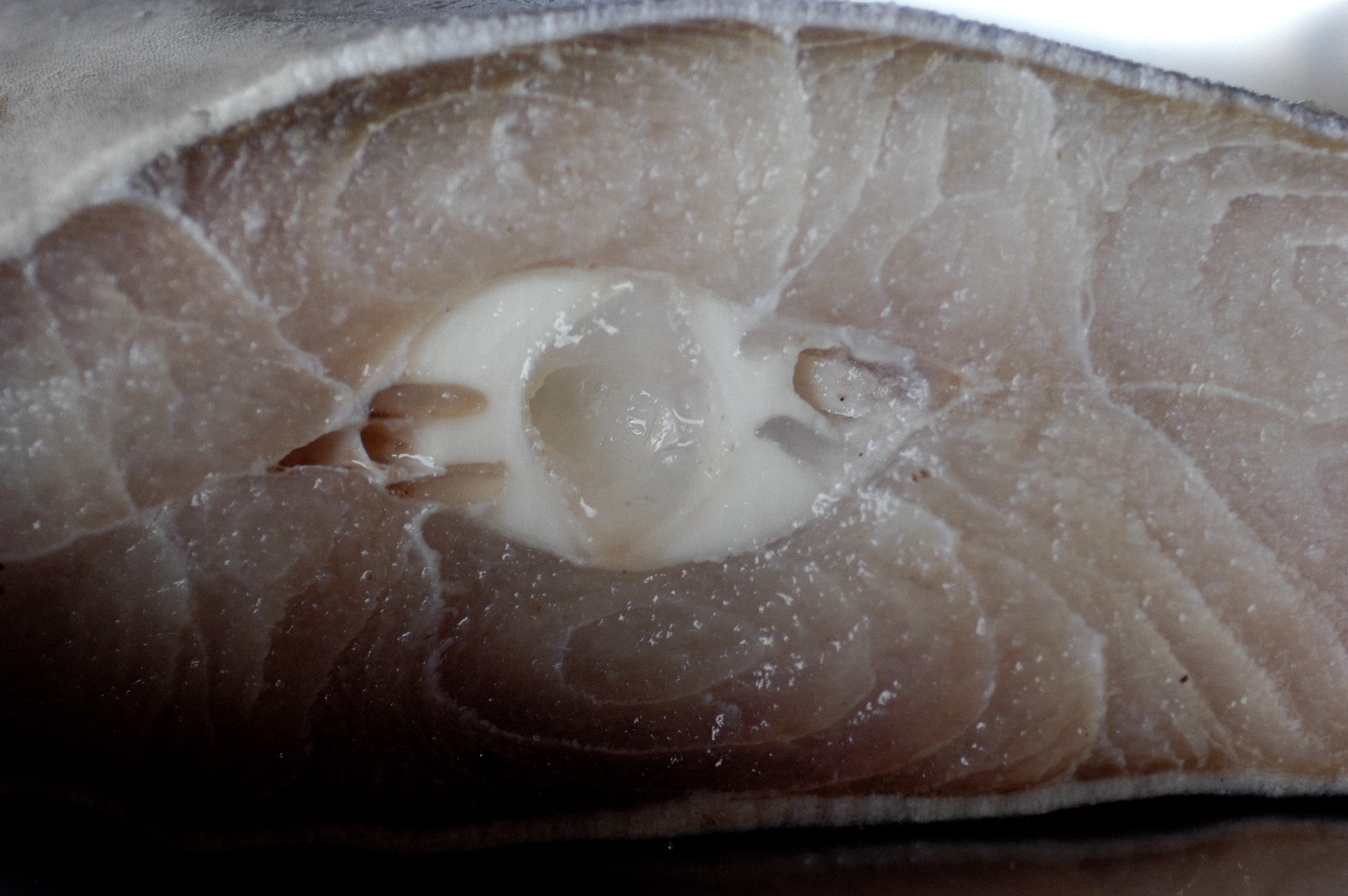
A cross-section of shark meat, showing its white cartilage

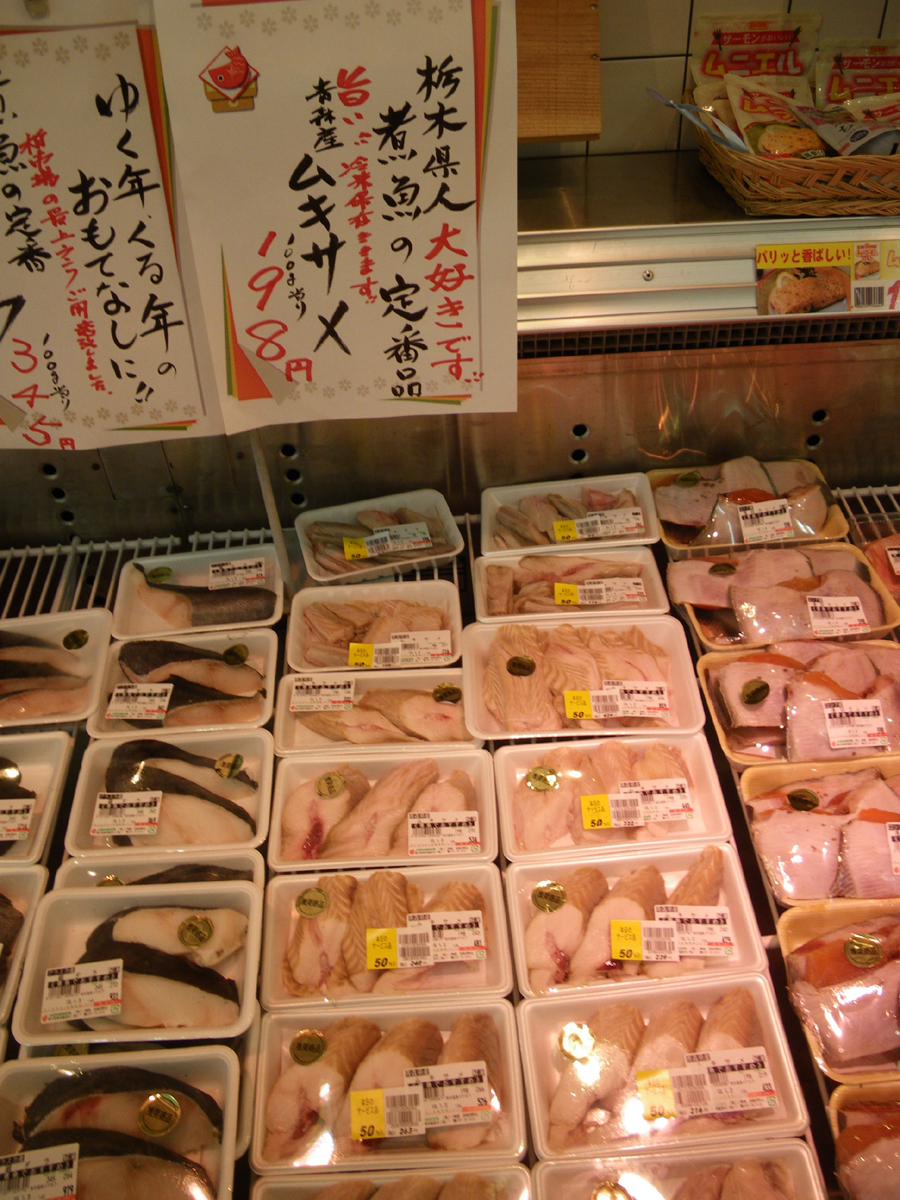
Shark meat at a supermarket in Japan

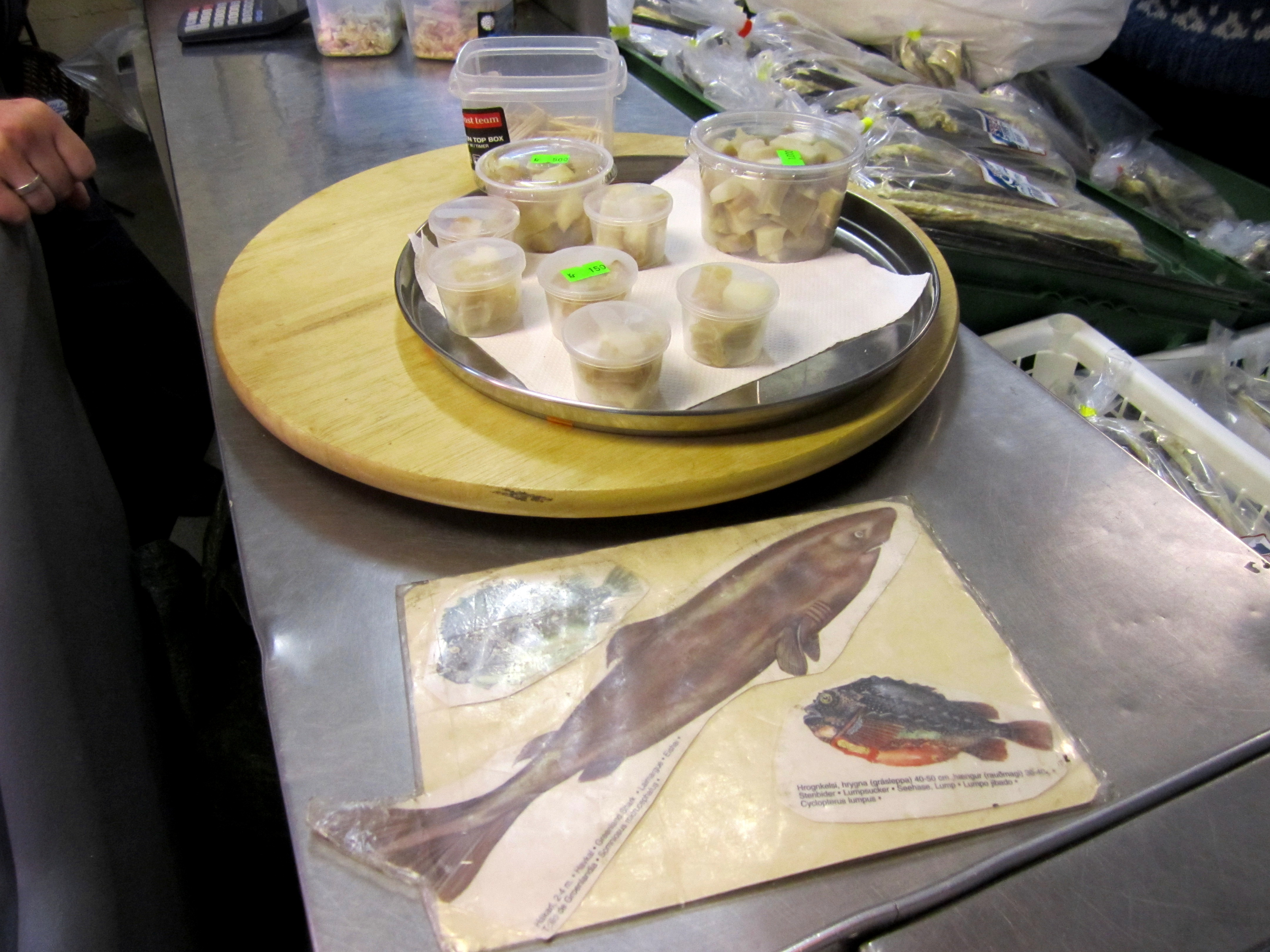
Fermented shark meat

Shark meat is a seafood consisting of the flesh of sharks. Several sharks are fished for human consumption, such as porbeagles, dogfish sharks, requiem shark, and salmon sharks, among others. Shark meat is popular in Asia, where it is often consumed dried, smoked, or salted. The largest consumer of shark meat in the world is Brazil, but it is also consumed regularly in Iceland, Japan, Australia, parts of India, parts of Canada, the United States, Sri Lanka, areas of Africa, Mexico and Yemen. China is a large consumer of shark meat and are primary contributors to loss of shark populations in the pacific.

Sharks have been eaten at least since the Late Bronze Age (1550–1130 BC), for example in the Levant.

== Preparation ==
Unprocessed shark meat may have a strong odor of ammonia, due to the high urea content that develops as the fish decomposes. The urea content and ammonia odor can be reduced by marinating the meat in liquids such as lemon juice, vinegar, milk, or saltwater. Preparation methods include slicing the meat into steaks and fillets.

== Africa ==
In Eastern Africa and islands in the Indian Ocean, shark meat has been traded and has been a significant source of protein for centuries. Its consumption may occur primarily in coastal areas. It may be preserved using salt curing to extend its shelf life and to enable easier transportation.

== Americas ==
=== Brazil ===
Brazil has long been the largest consumer of shark meat in the world. The most common species fished and consumed in the country is the blue shark, but Brazil is also the largest importer of shark meat, and imported species are often not correctly identified. Shark meat is marketed generically as cação, regardless of the species. Although the word cação translates as shark, it is not the most used one to refer to a living shark, which is more commonly called tubarão. This causes a misconception in about half of the country not being aware that cação is meat from sharks, or mistakenly thinking it is a specific species of shark.

Shark meat is popular due to its low price and boneless nature. It is one of the most common choices of fish for the local dish Moqueca, a traditional fish stew.

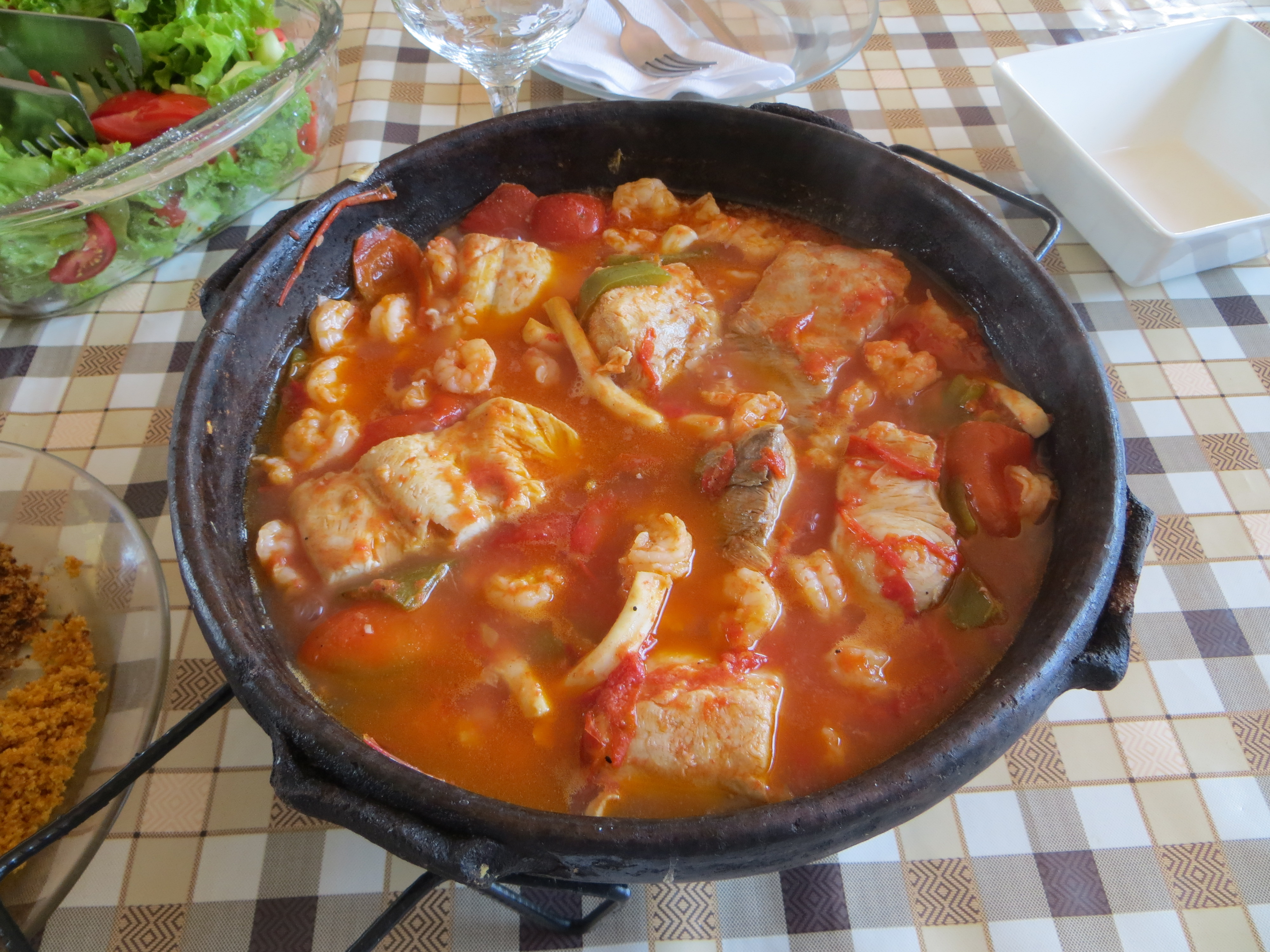
A home-made Brazilian moqueca with shark, shrimps and vegetables

Unlike Asian countries, shark fin soup has virtually no market in Brazil, so the controversial practice of finning is very rare in the country. However, a common controversy is that shark fins are often sold in Asia at high prices, while their carcasses are sold to Brazil very cheaply. The Brazilian market would be, thus, providing a justification for shark fishing, masking the waste caused by finning without actually reducing its impacts.

== Asia ==
Shark meat is common and popular in Asia. In 1999, the combined countries of Asia led in the number of sharks caught. Asian fisheries harvested 55.4% of the world's shark catch in 1996.

=== Japan ===
Japan has a large market share in the trade of frozen and fresh shark meat, for both importation and exportation. Shark meat is typically consumed in prepared forms in Japan, such as in prepared fish sausage, surimi, fish paste, fish balls, and other products.

=== Korea ===
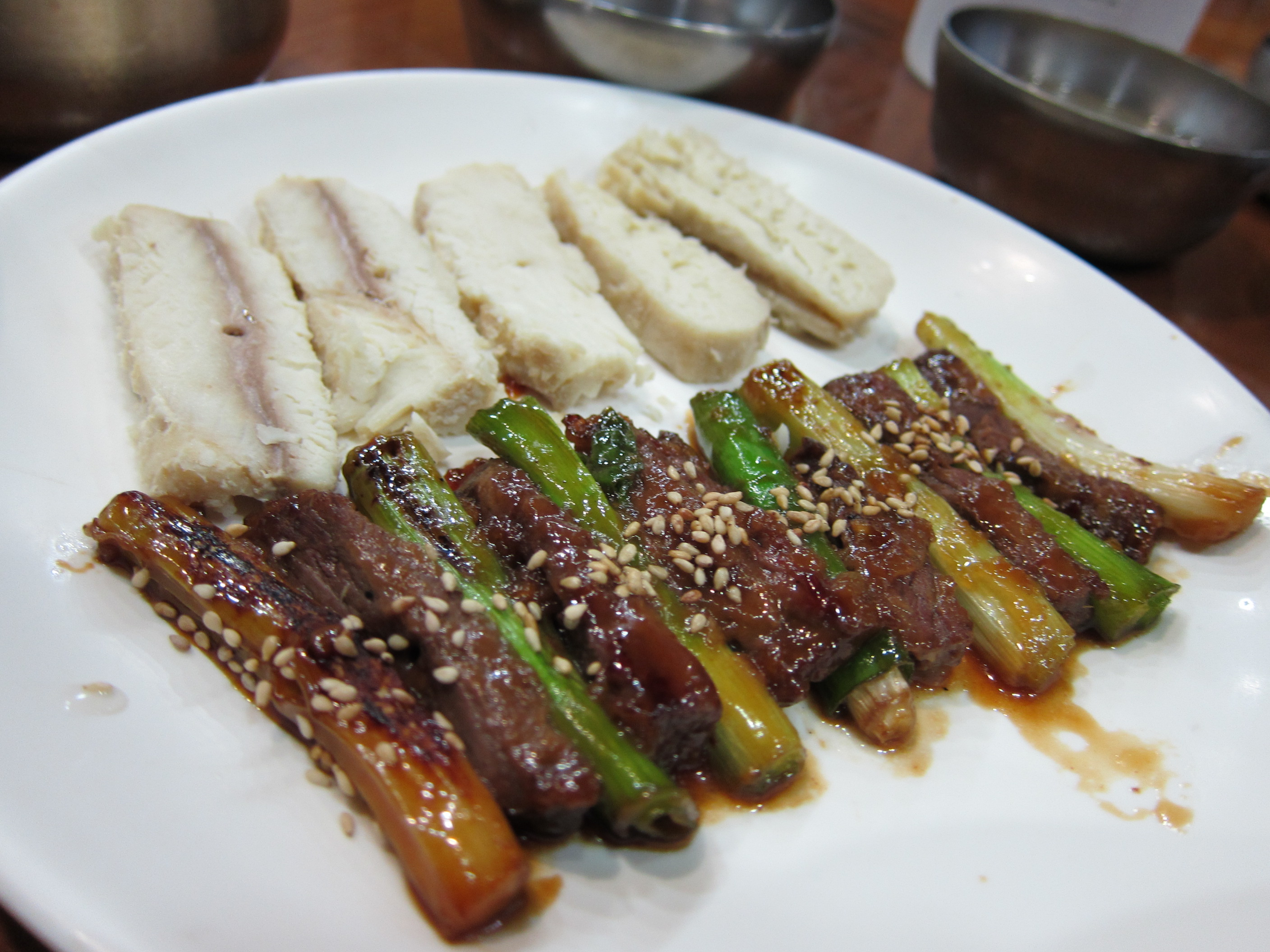
Sanjeok (skewered beef and scallions) and dombaegi (salted shark meat)

In Korea, dombaegi (돔배기), salted shark meat, is eaten in North Gyeongsang Province, and it is considered to be a local food in Yeongcheon that is common in holidays.

=== India ===
Mori mutton, also known as moryechi xacuti, is a spicy Goan shark fish curry. This spicy curry is made by marinating baby shark in green masala and cooking it in a curry of onion, spices, and coconut.

=== Yemen ===
Salted, dried shark meat known as Lakham (لخم) is widely consumed in the Southeastern part of Yemen, particularly Hadhramaut.

=== Philippines ===
Kinunot is a dish from the Bicol region, known for its use of stingray (pagi) or young shark (pating) cooked in coconut milk with malunggay (moringa) leaves. The name "kinunot" translates to "shredded" in Bikol, referring to the finely flaked fish meat used in the recipe. The dish is often flavored with vinegar, garlic, onions, ginger, and chili peppers, giving it a intense, creamy, and mildly spicy taste characteristic of Bicolano cuisine. Kinunot is also prepared with other types of seafood apart from shark and stingray, depending on availability and local preference. This dish is typically eaten with steamed rice, both at festivals and as an everyday meal.

== Australia ==
Shark meat is popular in Australia, where it is known as flake. Flake is sourced primarily from gummy shark, a small, bottom-feeding species abundant along the east coast of Australia. However, due to the depletion of Australian and then New Zealand shark stocks, this demand is increasingly being filled by gummy sharks sourced from South Africa. Flake can be purchased as a ready-made meal from most Australian fish and chip shops, usually in the form of battered or grilled fillets.

== Europe ==
Per the Food and Agriculture Organization of the United Nations (FAO), European countries are major markets for shark meat. Pickled dogfish is popular food in Germany, France, and other northern European countries. The meat is typically processed and consumed in steaks and fillets. In Germany, though, a preference exists for backs, belly, and smoked belly flaps, which are referred to as Schillerlocken. Per the FAO, Italy led globally in the importation of shark meat in 1999, with France and Spain following. In 1999, France imported the second-largest amount of shark meat on a global level.

Small sharks are sold in Britain as rock salmon by fish and chips shops.

=== Iceland ===
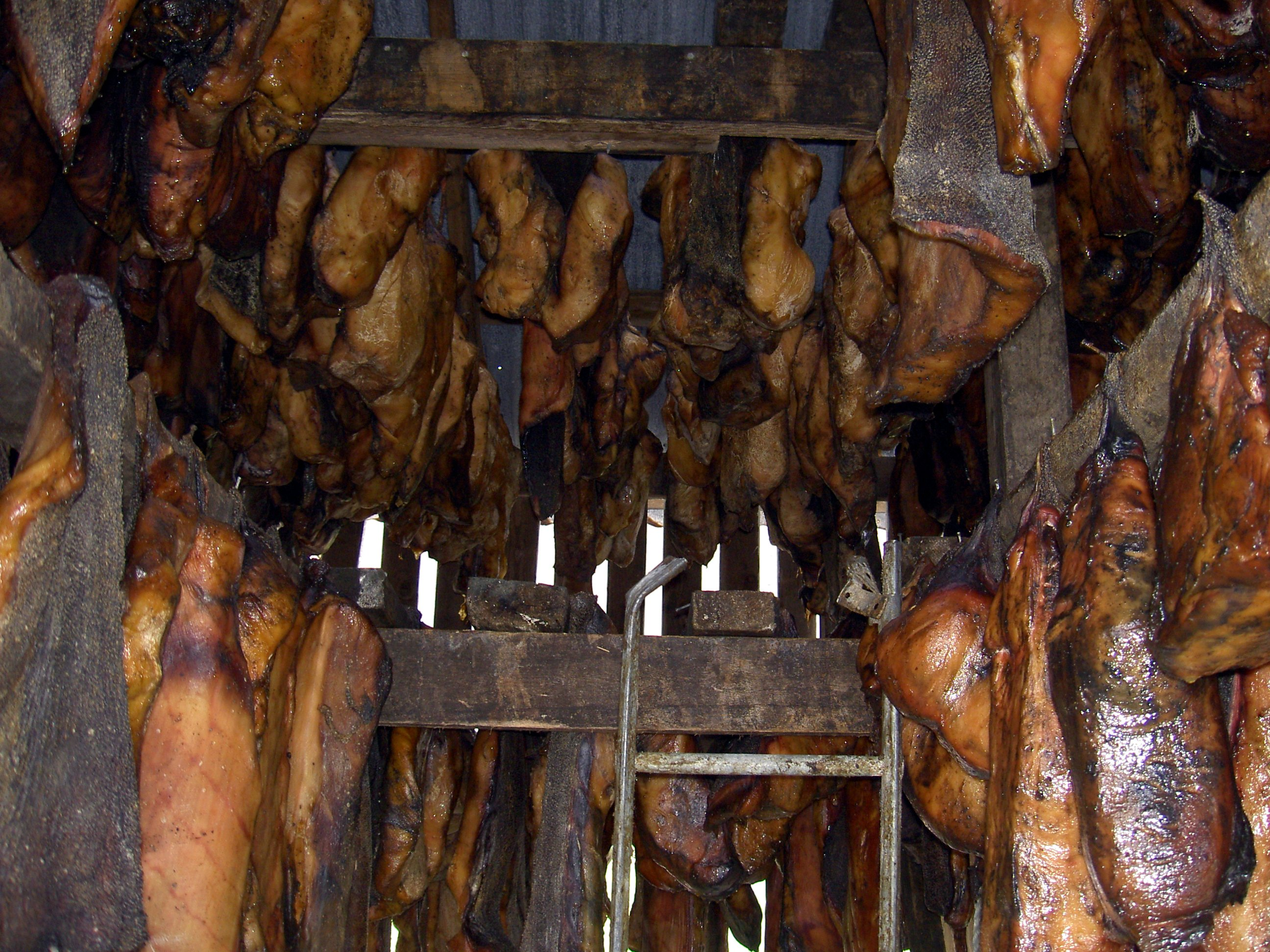
Hákarl drying in Iceland

In Iceland, hákarl is a national dish prepared using Greenland shark or sleeper shark. The shark meat is buried and fermented to cure it, and then hung to dry for several months.

=== Italy ===
In the island of Sardinia, the Burrida (a local version of Buridda) is a popular antipasto, made boiling usually a catshark (less commonly using a common smooth-hound) on vinegar with onion and walnuts. A similar dish also called Burrida is prepared in the Balearic Islands of Spain with tunas instead of catsharks.

== See also ==
- Bake and Shark
- Fermented fish
- List of fermented foods
- Shark fin soup
- Sharkfin and prawn dumpling in superior soup
