= Nem nướng Ninh Hòa =

Vietnamese grilled pork

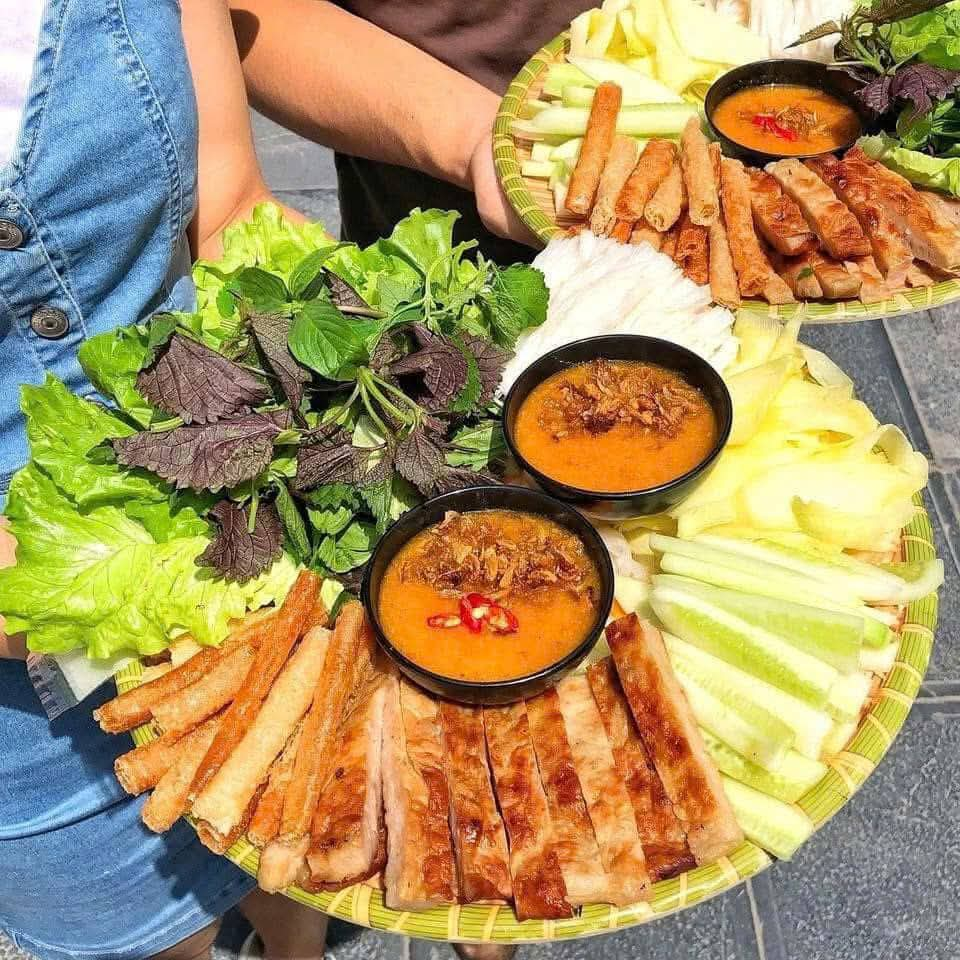
- Nem nướng served with rice paper, fresh herbs, and dipping sauce
- Course: Main dish; snack
- Place of origin: Vietnam
- Region or state: Ninh Hòa, Khánh Hòa province
- Main ingredients: Pork; Bánh tráng (rice paper wrappers); fresh herbs; Nước chấm (dipping sauce)

Nem nướng Ninh Hòa (nem nướng Ninh Hòa) is a regional style of Vietnamese grilled pork associated with Ninh Hòa in Khánh Hòa province, Vietnam. It is typically made from seasoned pounded or minced pork molded around bamboo skewers and grilled over charcoal, then served by wrapping it in rice paper with fresh herbs and dipping it in a thick sauce.

== Background and terminology ==
In local usage, the label "nem Ninh Hòa" may be used broadly for both fermented nem and grilled nem; in this usage, nem nướng refers to the pork mixture shaped, skewered, and grilled over charcoal. Tourism descriptions from Khánh Hòa have characterized nem Ninh Hòa as a long-established local specialty associated with the Ninh Hòa area and its surrounding region.

== Ingredients and preparation ==
The main ingredient is fresh pork (often from the shoulder or ham), mixed with seasonings and pounded or ground until sticky and elastic. The mixture is shaped into elongated portions around bamboo skewers and grilled over charcoal until it is cooked through and aromatic, with a lightly browned exterior.

== Serving and dipping sauce ==
Nem nướng is commonly served with Bánh tráng (rice paper wrappers), crisp fried rice paper, fresh herbs, and sometimes rice vermicelli. Diners assemble the components into a wrap and dip it into a thick sauce. Descriptions of the Ninh Hòa style often emphasize a cooked dipping sauce that may be prepared with glutinous rice, soybeans, tomatoes, and minced lean pork, seasoned with sugar, garlic, and chili; some versions may include shrimp for sweetness.

The accompanying herbs can vary by season, and may include lettuce, cucumber, basil, and other aromatic greens that add freshness and contrast to the grilled pork.

== Popularity and recognition ==
Nem nướng Ninh Hòa has been promoted as a local specialty in provincial tourism channels, including listings that described it as part of a "Top 100" selection of Vietnamese specialty dishes.

== See also ==
- Vietnamese cuisine
- Nem
- Nem nướng
- Nem chua
- Nước chấm
- Bánh tráng
