= Yam naem =

Yam Naem (Thai: ยำแหนม) is a Thai food name. It may refer to:

- Yam naem khao thot (ยำแหนมข้าวทอด), a snack dish made with crumbled, crispy-fried curried rice balls
- Yam naem sot (ยำแหนมสด), a type of yam Thai salad
