= Nem =

Vietnamese food that is rolled up

Nem (Vietnamese: món nem) refers to various dishes in Vietnamese, depending on the locality.

Nem may refer to:

- Nem rán, known in foreign countries as spring rolls, fried rolls or Vietnamese Imperial rolls, are made of either minced pork or prawns, wrapped in bánh tráng and deep-fried. In southern Vietnam, it is referred to as chả giò. Nem rán rế is a similar dish as nem rán; however, it is wrapped in woven bánh tráng.
- Nem cuốn (gỏi cuốn in southern Vietnam), nem rolls, salad rolls, or summer rolls, is a Vietnamese dish traditionally consisting of pork, prawns, vegetables, bún (rice vermicelli), fresh herbs and other ingredients wrapped in bánh tráng.
- Nem chua is a Vietnamese fermented pork dish, usually rolled or cut in bite sizes. The meat is sweet, sour, salty and spicy. It is often served with bird's eye chili, garlic and Vietnamese coriander.
- Nem chua rán are a type of nem made from ground pork and pork skin according to the recipe and process quite close to nem chua and fried in cooking oil (or grilled).
- Nem nướng are Vietnamese barbecued pork meatballs typically eaten wrapped in bánh tráng with fresh herbs, bún (rice vermicelli) and dipped in some sort of sauce.
- Nem bì, also known as tré, with a main ingredient of pork skin chopped into fibers; fried lean shoulder meat, skin and boiled fat may be added. Then, all are wrapped in guava leaves or banana leaves.
- Nem chạo, also known as nem thính, is a popular dish in the cuisine in the northern provinces of Vietnam.

== See also ==
- NEM (disambiguation)
