= Sai gork =

Type of Lao sausage

- Type: Sausage
- Place of origin: Laos
- Associated cuisine: Lao cuisine

Sai gork (Lao: ໄສ້ກອກ, also sai gok, sai kok or sai krok), also known as soured Lao sausage, is a sour sausage in Lao cuisine. The ingredients for sai oua (Lao sausage) and sai gork are mainly the same, but sai gork uses cooked Lao sticky rice as an additional ingredient in the filling. The sai gork is then allowed to "sour" or ferment at room temperature for several days. This style of Lao sausage can also be found in Northern and Northeastern Thailand where the Lao cultural and culinary influence have reached.

== See also ==
- Naem
- Sai krok Isan, the Northeastern Thai version of the sausage
- Sai oua
- List of sausages
