= Nem chua rán =

Vietnamese street food

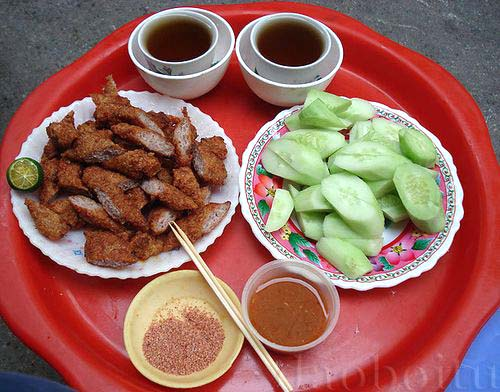
- Nem chua rán with cucumber and nước chấm
- Type: nem chua
- Place of origin: Vietnam
- Region or state: Northern Vietnam
- Main ingredients: ground pork, pork skin, fried flour, chicken eggs, lemongrass, vinegar, tapioca starch, minced red onion, thính gạo
- Food energy (per serving): 150 kcal (630 kJ)

Nem chua rán is a popular street food in Vietnam.
