= Shark fin soup =

Soup in Chinese cuisine

Shark's fin soup
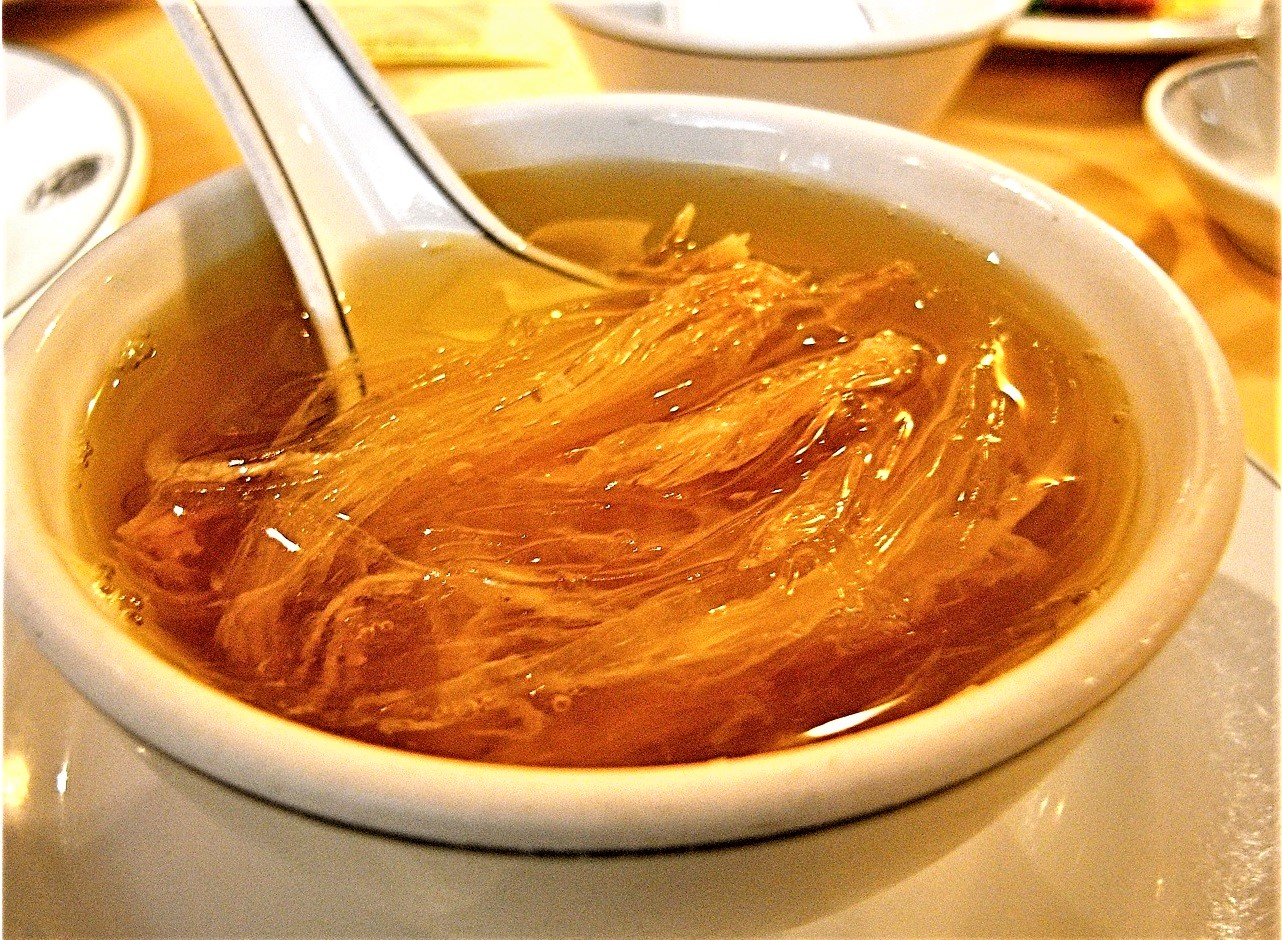
- Alternative names: Shark's fin soup
- Type: Soup
- Place of origin: China
- Main ingredients: Shark fins, broth

Shark fin soup
- Traditional Chinese: 魚翅羹
- Simplified Chinese: 鱼翅羹
- Literal meaning: "fish fin stew"
Transcriptions
Standard Mandarin
- Hanyu Pinyin: yúchì gēng
- Wade–Giles: yü^{2}-ch'ih^{4} keng^{1}
- IPA: [y̌.ʈʂʰɨ̂ kə́ŋ]
Yue: Cantonese
- Yale Romanization: yùh-chi gāng
- Jyutping: jyu4-ci3 gang1
- IPA: [jy˩.tsʰi˧ kɐŋ˥]
Southern Min
- Hokkien POJ: hî-tshì kng, hû-tshì kng

Shark fin soup is a soup or stewed dish served in parts of China, Taiwan, and Southeast Asia. The shark fins provide texture, while the taste comes from the other ingredients. As one of the four sea delicacies, it is commonly served at special occasions such as weddings and banquets, or as a luxury item.

It has been condemned by the Humane Society International, which states that approximately 72 million sharks are killed each year for their fins. Currently, international concerns over the sustainability and welfare of sharks have impacted consumption and availability of the soup worldwide. Recently, health concerns about the high concentration of BMAA in shark fins have arisen.

Shark fin soup substitutes have lately appeared on the market which do not require any shark fins.

== Preparation ==
Traditional shark fin soup or stew is made with fins obtained from a variety of shark species. Raw fins are processed by first removing the skin and denticles before trimming them into shapes and bleaching to a more desirable coloration.

Sharks' fins are sold dried, cooked, wet, and frozen. Ready-to-eat shark fin soup is also readily available in Asian markets.

Dried fins come in cooked and skinned (shredded) and raw and unskinned (whole), the latter requiring more preparation. Both need to be softened before they can be used to prepare soup.

== Taste ==
The taste of the soup comes from the broth, as the fins themselves have little perceptible flavor. Rather than for taste, the fins are used for their "snappy, gelatinous" texture, which has been described as "chewy, sinewy, stringy". Krista Mahr of Time called it "somewhere between chewy and crunchy".

== Health impact ==
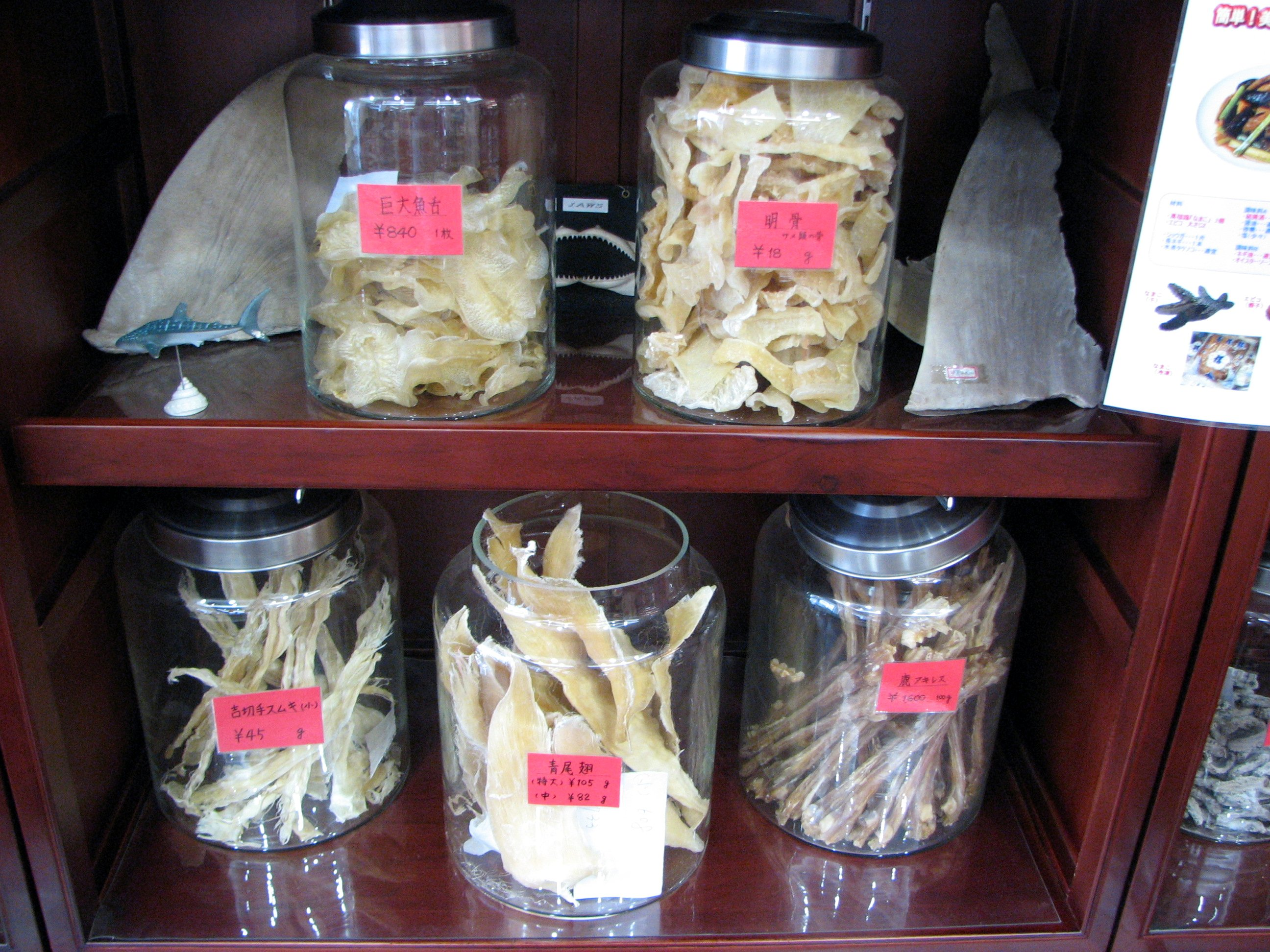
Shark fins and other shark parts for sale in a Chinese pharmacy in Yokohama, Japan

Shark fins are believed in Chinese culture to have properties of boosting sexual potency, enhancing skin quality, increasing qi or energy, preventing heart disease, and lowering cholesterol. In traditional Chinese medicine, shark fins are believed to help in areas of rejuvenation, appetite enhancement, and blood nourishment and to be beneficial to vital energy, kidneys, lungs, bones, and many other parts of the body.

There are claims that shark fins prevent cancer; however, there is no scientific evidence, and one study found shark cartilage generally to be of no value in cancer treatment. Furthermore, there is no scientific evidence that shark fins can be used to treat any medical condition. Sharks biomagnify toxins, so eating shark meat may raise the risk of dementia and mercury poisoning.

WildAid, a wildlife non-governmental organization, stated that eating too much shark fin can cause sterility in men due to heavy metal content. It is known that larger fish such as shark, tuna, and swordfish contain high levels of mercury and methylmercury salts. For nursing mothers, young children, and pregnant women or those who wish to be, the United States Food and Drug Administration has advised avoiding consumption of fish high in mercury.

High concentrations of BMAA are present in shark fins. Because BMAA is a neurotoxin, consumption of shark fin soup and cartilage pills may pose a risk for degenerative brain diseases such as Alzheimer's and ALS, as well as Parkinson's disease.

Counterfeit shark fins often also contain toxins.

== Market and demand ==
=== Early use ===
Shark fin soup was reported in Ming dynasty writings and by the Qing dynasty was considered a "traditional part of formal banquets"; in Chinese cuisine, it was considered to be one of the eight treasured foods from the sea. It was popular with Chinese emperors because it was rare, and considered tasty only after a complicated and elaborate preparation. By the time of the Qing dynasty, shark fin soup was in high demand. Its manual of cuisine, the Suiyuan shidan, indicates that the shark fin was eaten as soup, stew, and even as a stir-fry, but in all cases the fin had to be boiled for two days.

The popularity of shark fin soup rose in the late-18th and early-19th centuries as standards of living began to improve.

=== Demand peaks, c. 2000 ===
In the late-20th century, shark fin soup was a popular delicacy in China, and was eaten in Chinese restaurants around the world. The increasing wealth of the middle class raised demand. The shark fin trade more than doubled between 1985 and 2001.

Based on information gathered from the Hong Kong trade in fins, the market was estimated in 2004 to be growing by five percent each year. Consumption of shark fin soup had risen dramatically with the affluence of the middle class, as Chinese communities around the world enjoyed increasing income levels. The high price of the soup meant it was often used as a way to impress guests, or for celebrations such as weddings, banquets, and important business deals. It was used to communicate wealth, power, and prestige, as it was believed to show respect, honor, and appreciation to guests with 58% of those questioned in the WWF survey indicating they ate the soup at a celebration or gathering.

In Hong Kong restaurants, where the market had been strong, demand from Hong Kong natives had reportedly dropped in 2006. This was more than balanced by an increase in demand from mainland China, where economic growth put the expensive delicacy within the reach of an expanding middle class.

A survey carried out in China in 2006 by WildAid and the Chinese Wildlife Conservation Association found that 35% of participants said they had consumed shark fin soup in the last year, while 83% of participants in an online survey conducted by the World Wide Fund for Nature said that they had consumed shark fin soup at some time.

=== Changes in demand, 2005–present ===
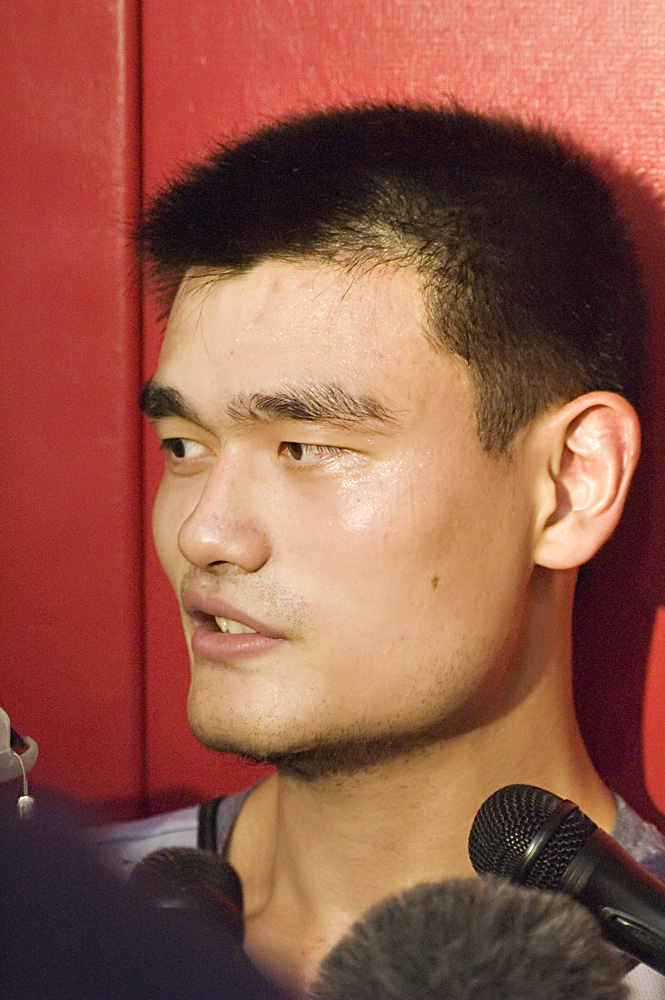
Yao Ming, a former NBA basketball player who campaigned against shark fin soup.

The movement against shark fin soup began in 2006, when WildAid enlisted Chinese basketball star Yao Ming as spokesperson for a public relations campaign against the dish. The campaign was taken up by a coalition of Chinese businessmen, celebrities, and students. Businessman-turned-environmentalist Jim Zhang helped to raise concern within China's government, which pledged in 2012 to ban shark fin soup from official banquets within three years.

In January 2013, China Daily reported that officials in Zhejiang province found that many shark fin soup restaurants were selling artificial shark fins, and that one-third of the samples that the officials had obtained contained dangerous amounts of cadmium and methylmercury. Within two months of the China Daily report, China ordered officials throughout the country to stop serving dishes made from protected wildlife at official banquets, and the Hong Kong government issued a similar order in September.

Consumption of shark fin soup in China has decreased. China's Ministry of Commerce indicated that consumption of shark fin soup during the 2013 spring break holiday had decreased by 50–70% from 2012, and Hong Kong industry groups reported that shark fin imports were down by 20–30% from 2012. Also, anecdotal evidence points to a worldwide drop in shark fin prices and a move away from shark fishing in parts of Africa. Shark fin soup has often been replaced by dishes featuring sea cucumbers.

In Hong Kong, a 2016 poll from the City University of Hong Kong and the Hong Kong Shark Foundation had 75% of local respondents saying they were "neutral" towards the soup at banquets, while 90% of respondents said they would eat the dish if served to them, with the most popular justifications being to "avoid food waste" or to "show respect for their host".

A 2018 WildAid report mentioned Thailand as an emerging market for shark fin soup, citing a 2017 survey where 57% of urban Thai respondents consumed the dish, most commonly at weddings, restaurants, and business meetings.

According to British writer Adam Sweeting in 2011, Taiwan was "a major centre of both the shark-fishing industry and shark-fin consumption". WildAid noted in 2019 that although consumption declined significantly in mainland China, demand for shark fin remained "huge" in not only Taiwan but also Hong Kong and Macau.

== Ethical and environmental concerns ==
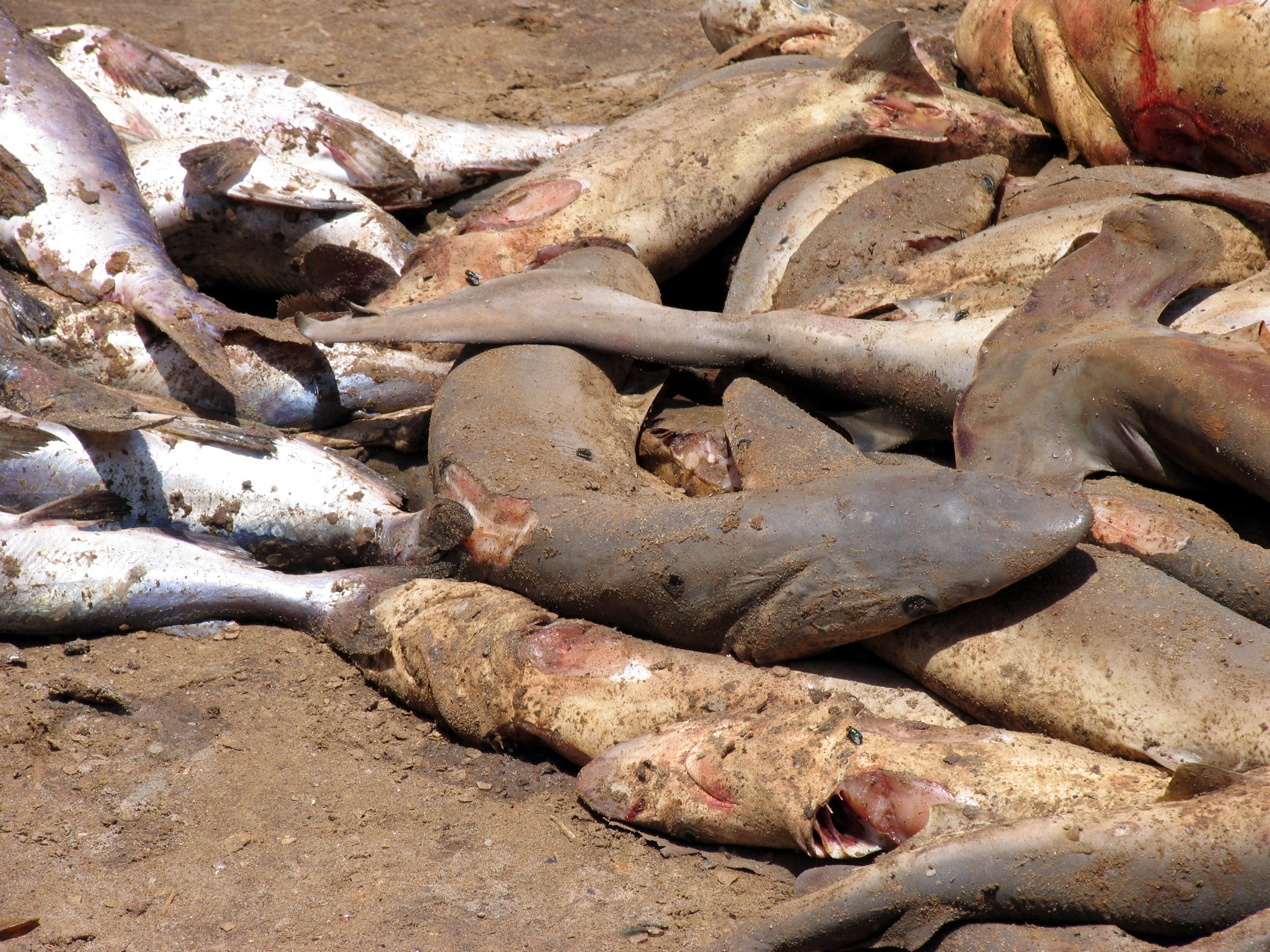
Finned sharks

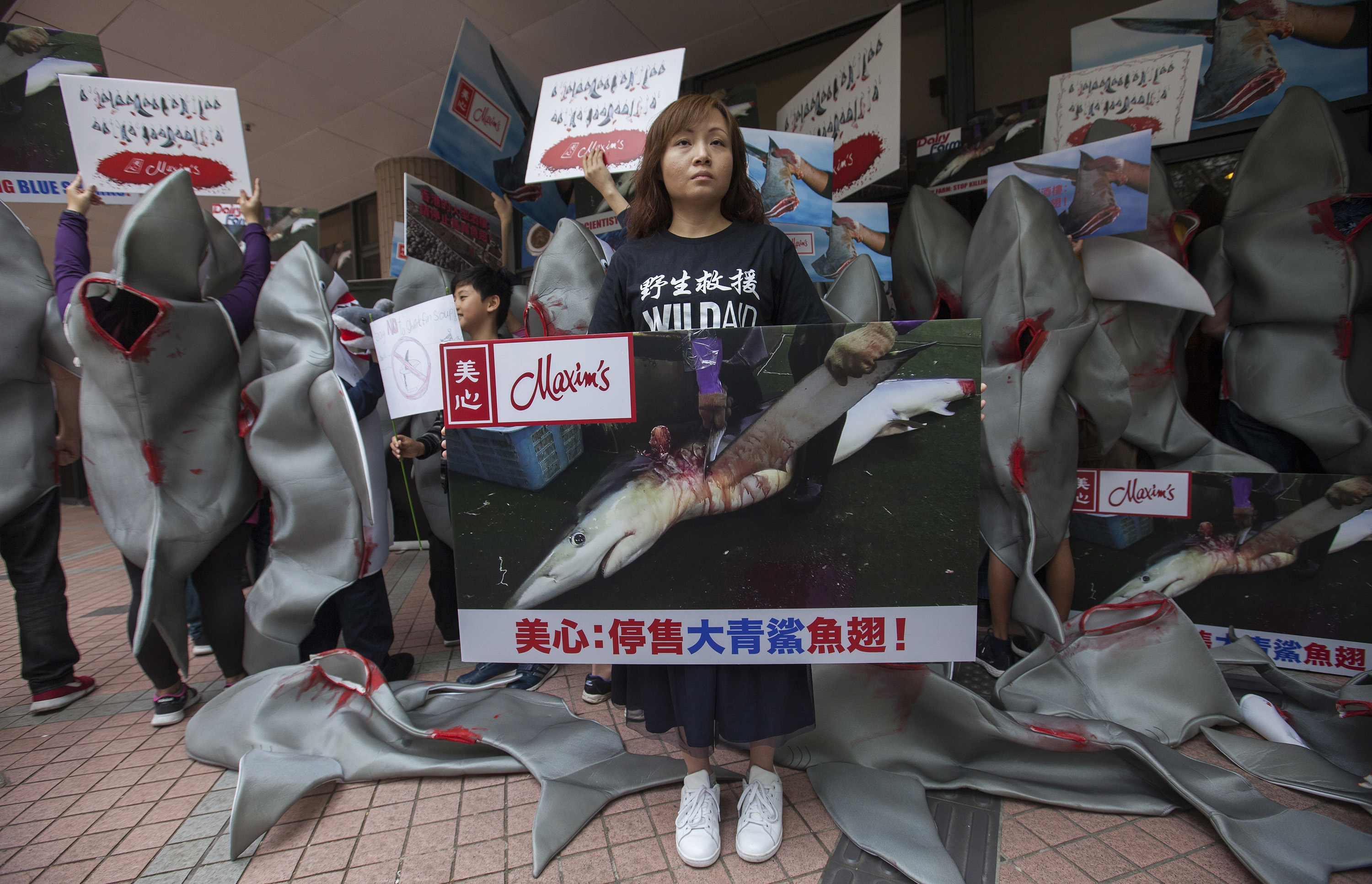
Shark fin protest at Maxim's restaurant at the University of Hong Kong 10 February 2018

Shark fins used in the soup are the cartilaginous dorsal, pectoral and caudal fins. These are regularly harvested by a process known as shark finning, which takes only the fins and discards the carcass, alive or dead. Overfishing poses a major threat to the world's shark populations.

Some groups, such as Fins Attached, Shark Savers, IUCN, Shark Angels, Shark Whisperer and the Sea Shepherd Conservation Society, discourage consumption of the soup due to concerns with the world's shark population and how sharks are inhumanely finned alive and returned to the ocean, unable to swim, hunt or survive. The prevalence of shark finning and the sustainability of shark species are both debated. As of 2011, major hotel operators such as Marriott International, The Peninsula Hotels and Shangri-La Hotels and Resorts stopped serving shark fin soup in favor of offering sustainable seafood. The largest supermarket chains in Singapore – Cold Storage and NTUC FairPrice – have stopped selling shark fins, citing sustainability concerns. Hong Kong Disneyland dropped the soup from its menu after it could not find a sustainable source.

Malaysia's Natural Resources and Environment Ministry banned shark fin soup from official functions in a commitment to the Malaysian Nature Society to conserve the shark species.

In the United States, Hawaii, Washington, Oregon, California, Guam, and the Commonwealth of the Northern Mariana Islands have banned the sale and possession of shark fins, effectively eliminating the availability of the soup. Illinois, which had been a large importer of shark fins, was the fifth U.S. state, and the first non-Pacific state, to implement a ban on shark fin trade. In 2011, U.S. President Barack Obama signed the Shark Conservation Act, closing loopholes used to obtain shark fins. In October 2011, California governor Jerry Brown, citing the cruelty of finning and potential threats to the environment and commercial fishing, signed Assembly Bill 376, banning the possession and sale of detached shark fins. Two Chinese American groups challenged the law in federal court, arguing among other things that it was discriminatory against the Chinese-American community. The federal courts rejected these claims.

In Canada, the Vancouver city council decided to work towards creating a ban to preserve shark species. Toronto joined other regional municipalities in adopting a shark fin ban on 13 October 2011. The Ontario Superior Court of Justice overturned the Toronto bylaw, as it was outside the powers of the city. Calgary banned shark fin soup on 16 July 2012, but in May 2013 shelved the bylaw indefinitely.

On 2 July 2012, the State Council of the People's Republic of China declared that shark fin soup can no longer be served at official banquets.

The marine conservation organization Bite-Back has campaigned against the sale of shark fin soup in Britain. On the back of its campaigning, the London-based Michelin-starred Chinese restaurant Hakkasan agreed to stop selling the soup. High-profile names such as Gordon Ramsay, Hugh Fearnley-Whittingstall, and Charles Clover, author of The End of the Line: How Overfishing Is Changing the World and What We Eat, have lent their support to the charity's 'Hacked Off' campaign. In 2019, environmental NGO WildAid partnered with Plan B Media on a public awareness campaign to discourage sharkfin soup consumption in Thailand.

== Imitation shark fin soup ==
Imitation shark fin soup
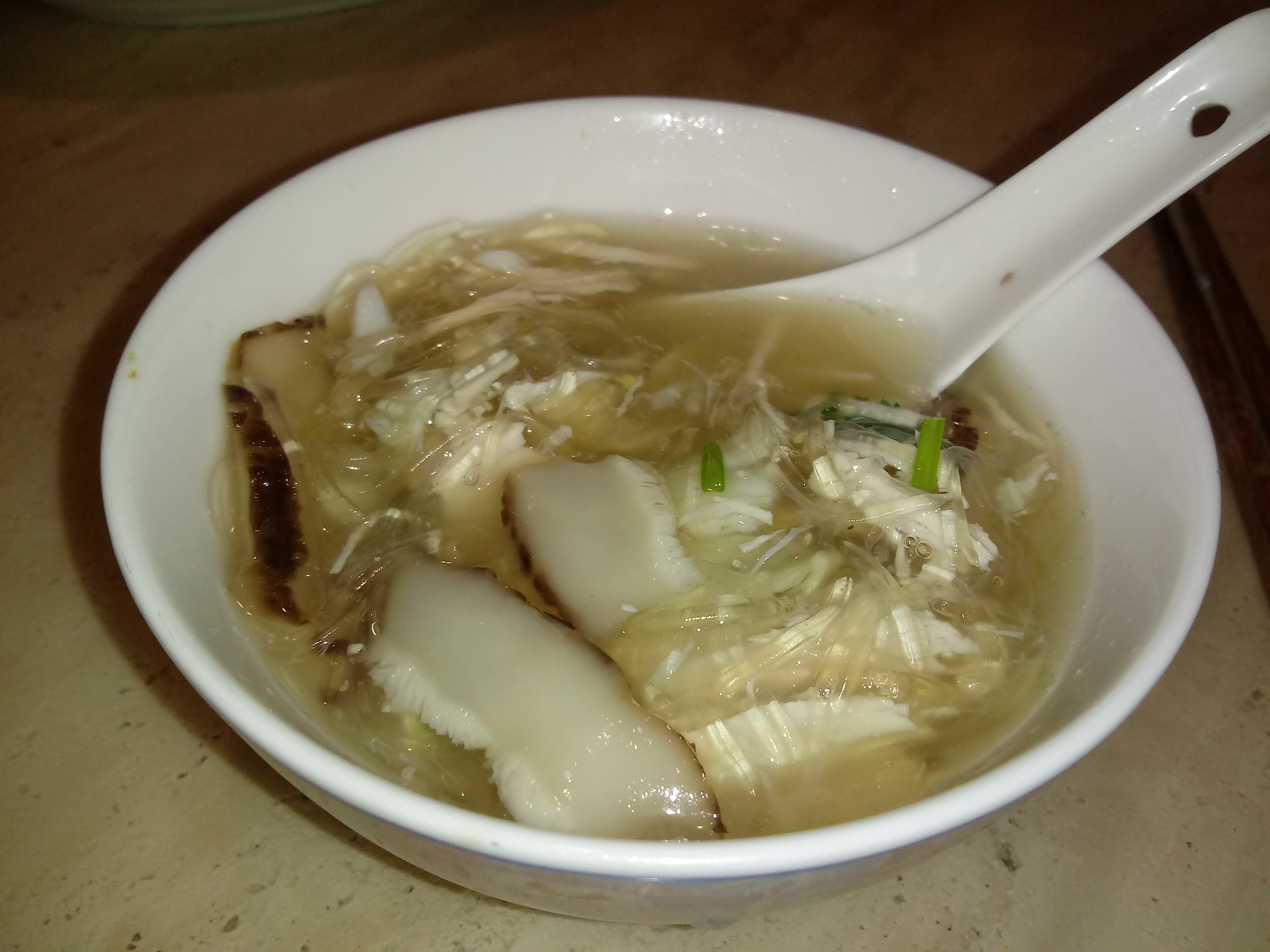
- A bowl of imitation shark fin soup, served in 2020 in California for a Chinese American family during the eve of Chinese New Year.
- Alternative names: Mock shark fin soup, vegetarian shark fin soup
- Type: Soup
- Place of origin: China
- Region or state: Hong Kong
- Main ingredients: Imitation shark fins (may use konjac gel, cellophane noodles, vermicelli, shark fin melon, or other alternatives), broth

Imitation shark fin soup
- Traditional Chinese: 碗仔翅
- Simplified Chinese: 碗仔翅
- Jyutping: wun2 zai2 ci3
- Hanyu Pinyin: wǎn zǎi chì
- Literal meaning: Fin in little bowl
Transcriptions
Standard Mandarin
- Hanyu Pinyin: wǎn zǎi chì
Yue: Cantonese
- Jyutping: wun2 zai2 ci3

Imitation shark fin soup is a noodle soup often sold in small bowls by street vendors in Hong Kong, where it is a common street snack. It is cheaper than shark fin soup, and may be chosen based on ethical concerns.

A popular, low-cost imitation shark fin soup (碗仔翅) made using vermicelli is widely available in Asia. They can also be made from cellophane noodles. Seafood companies in Asia later developed edible gelatinous products to imitate shark fins' qualities, commonly referred as "imitation shark fins".

=== Imitation shark fins ===
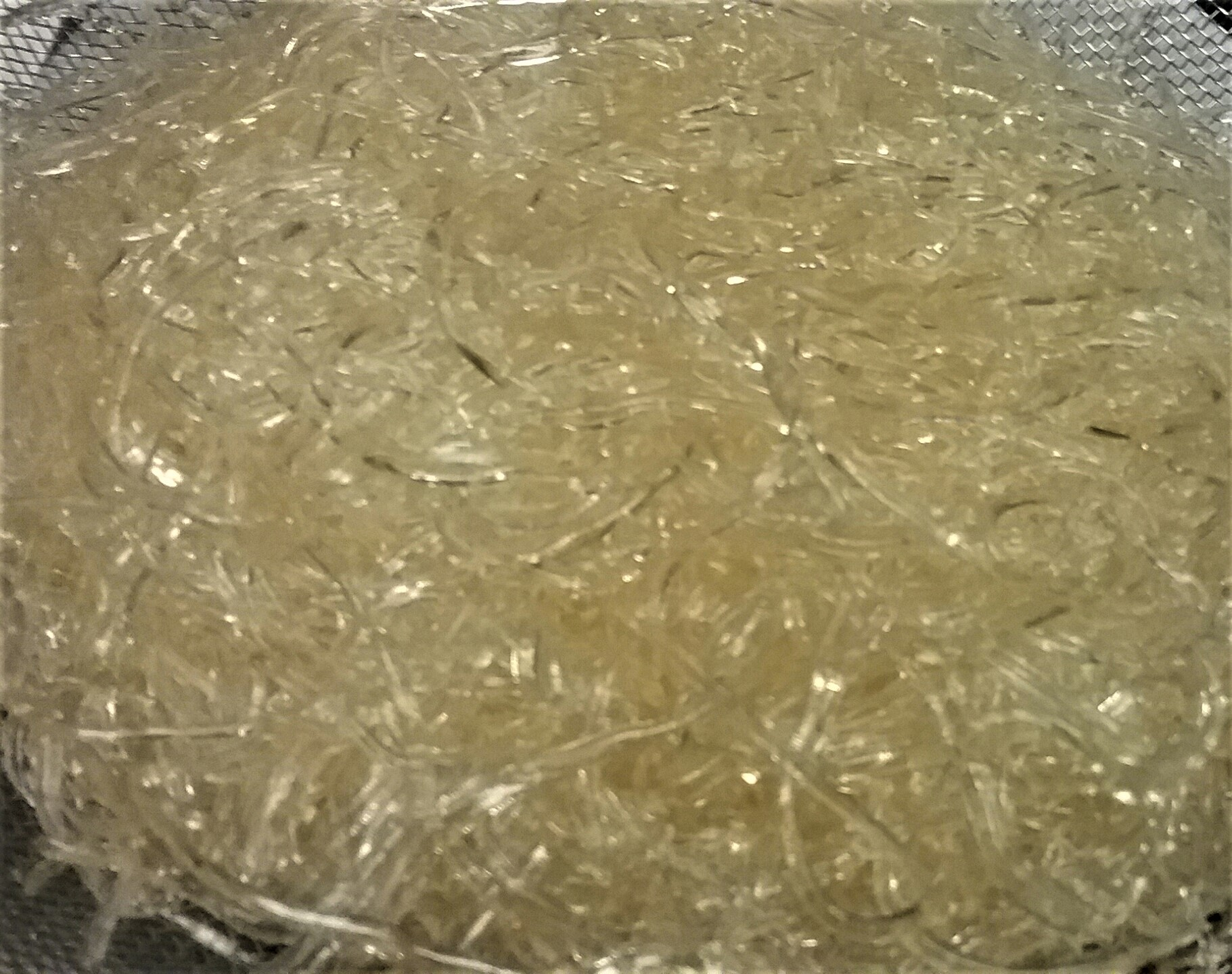
A batch of defrosted imitation shark fin; it imitates the real shark fins in appearance and gelatinous texture and it, along with julienned konjac gel, commonly used since the late-20th century as popular alternatives to them even before being banned due to being less expensive than the actual shark fins.

Substitutes for shark include imitation shark fin, konjac gel, various forms of noodles, and others. "Mock shark's fin" soup appeared in Hong Kong during the 1970s. From the 1990s onward, it became popular in restaurants throughout China. The shark fin is replaced with an imitation and edible mushrooms, kelps, seaweeds, bean sprouts, bamboo shoots, and beaten eggs are added, as in the traditional soup.

Imitation shark fin (素翅), known as sùchì in Mandarin and sou ci in Cantonese, literally means "vegetarian fin". A Taiwanese manufacturer's recipe for it contains water, gelatin, alginic acid, sugar, casein, and triolein to reproduce the chewy, gelatinous texture of shark fins. However, some of these imitations absorb the broth more quickly than the real shark fin. Konjac gel (known as moyu tofu in Mandarin, mo wu dau fu in Cantonese, and konnyaku in Japanese) can also be used as a substitute for shark fin once it is julienned into thin strands using a chef's knife, produce slicer, or food processor. While cellophane noodles are also often used as an alternative to shark fins, some cooks find them too soft and unable to withstand simmering long enough for flavors to be absorbed, consequently the imitation shark fin or julienned konjac gel are more desirable. Other substitutes include Cucurbita ficifolia (shark fin melon, shark fin soup squash), chicken breast, jinhua ham, vermicelli, soy, sea cucumber, bird's nest, pig's skin and gelatin.

Imitation shark fin is often used in restaurants across mainland China, due to its price being significantly cheaper. In California, imports of faux shark fin usually come from Japan, Hong Kong, and Taiwan. In 2015, a seafood company from San Francisco was working on a variation of imitation shark fin using algae-derived ingredients and recombinant proteins.

Alternatives to shark fin are inexpensive and easier to prepare. Imitation shark fin, konjac gel, and other alternatives can be purchased in preserved form from Asian supermarkets and convenience stores.

=== History ===
Imitation shark fin soup originated from Temple Street in Hong Kong during the 1950s and 1960s. Few people at that time could afford genuine shark fin soup, but street vendors collected the broken parts of shark fins discarded by Chinese restaurants and cooked them with mushrooms, egg, and pork, as well as soy sauce and other ingredients. The mixture, which was cooked into a soup, was served in a small bowl. Although this soup was inexpensive and lacked the authentic flavor, since it was cheap, tasty and contained many ingredients, it was popular among the poor and became one of the famous street snacks of Hong Kong.

Apart from the street vendor version, imitation shark fin soup may also be found in fast-food stores and expensive Chinese restaurants in Hong Kong and mainland China. Since April 2016, Cup Noodles released various instant imitation shark fin ramen soups.

== See also ==
- Bird's nest soup
- Hákarl
- Buddha Jumps Over the Wall, a soup containing shark fin
- Endangered sharks; many sharks are endangered as a consequence of the market for shark fins
- List of Chinese soups
- Sharkfin and prawn dumpling in superior soup
- Shark meat
- Sharkwater, 2006 documentary film
- United States v. Approximately 64,695 Pounds of Shark Fins, a 2008 court decision
- Three grand soups
- Shark finning
