= Sai oua =

Seasoned pork sausage in Laos, Myanmar, and Thailand

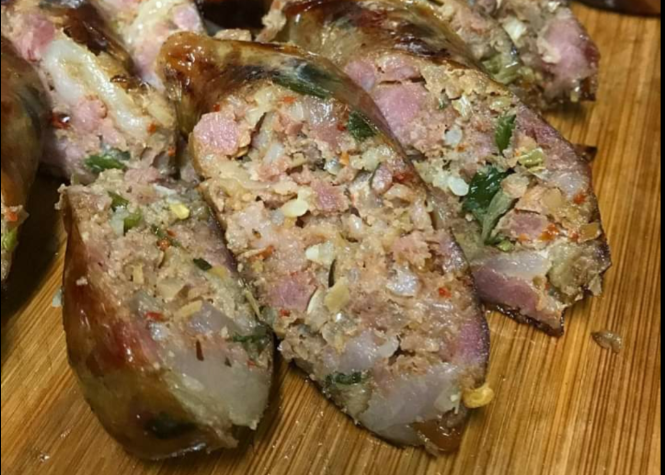
- Sliced Laotian sai oua
- Alternative names: Sai ua
- Type: Sausage
- Place of origin: Laos, Thailand
- Region or state: Southeast Asia, specifically Laos, Northern Thailand, and Northeastern Burma
- Associated cuisine: Lao, Myanmar, and Thai
- Serving temperature: hot
- Main ingredients: Pork; beef

Sai oua, sometimes also known as Lao sausage (Lao: ໄສ້ອັ່ວ, pronounced [sȁj ʔūa], also sai ua; Thai: ไส้อั่ว, pronounced [sâj ʔùa]; Northern Thai: ไส้อั่ว, pronounced [sa᷇j ʔùa]; Northeastern Thai: ไส้อั่ว, pronounced [sàj ʔúa]), is a popular type of sausage made in Laos, Myanmar, and Thailand, particularly in northern Thailand and northern Laos. It is prepared from coarsely chopped fatty pork seasoned with lemongrass, galangal, kaffir lime leaves, shallots, cilantro, chilies, garlic, salt, sticky rice, and fish sauce.

"Lao sausage" is a broad term used to describe local variants of Lao-style sai oua found in Laos and northern and northeastern Thailand. In Shan State, Myanmar, this sausage is known as sai long phik. In Thailand, it is also known as northern Thai sausage or Chiang Mai sausage. Sai oua is a staple food in Thailand's northern provinces and has also become popular in the rest of the country.

== Description ==
Sai oua contains minced pork, herbs, spices, and kaeng khua red curry paste. It can include coarsely chopped fatty pork seasoned with lemongrass, galangal, kaffir lime leaves, shallots, cilantro, chilies, garlic, salt, sticky rice, and fish sauce.

The sausage is either fermented, dried and roasted, or grilled before serving. It is usually eaten with sticky rice or served as a snack or appetizer. Traditionally, sai oua was a homemade sausage, but it is now widely available in shops.

== History ==
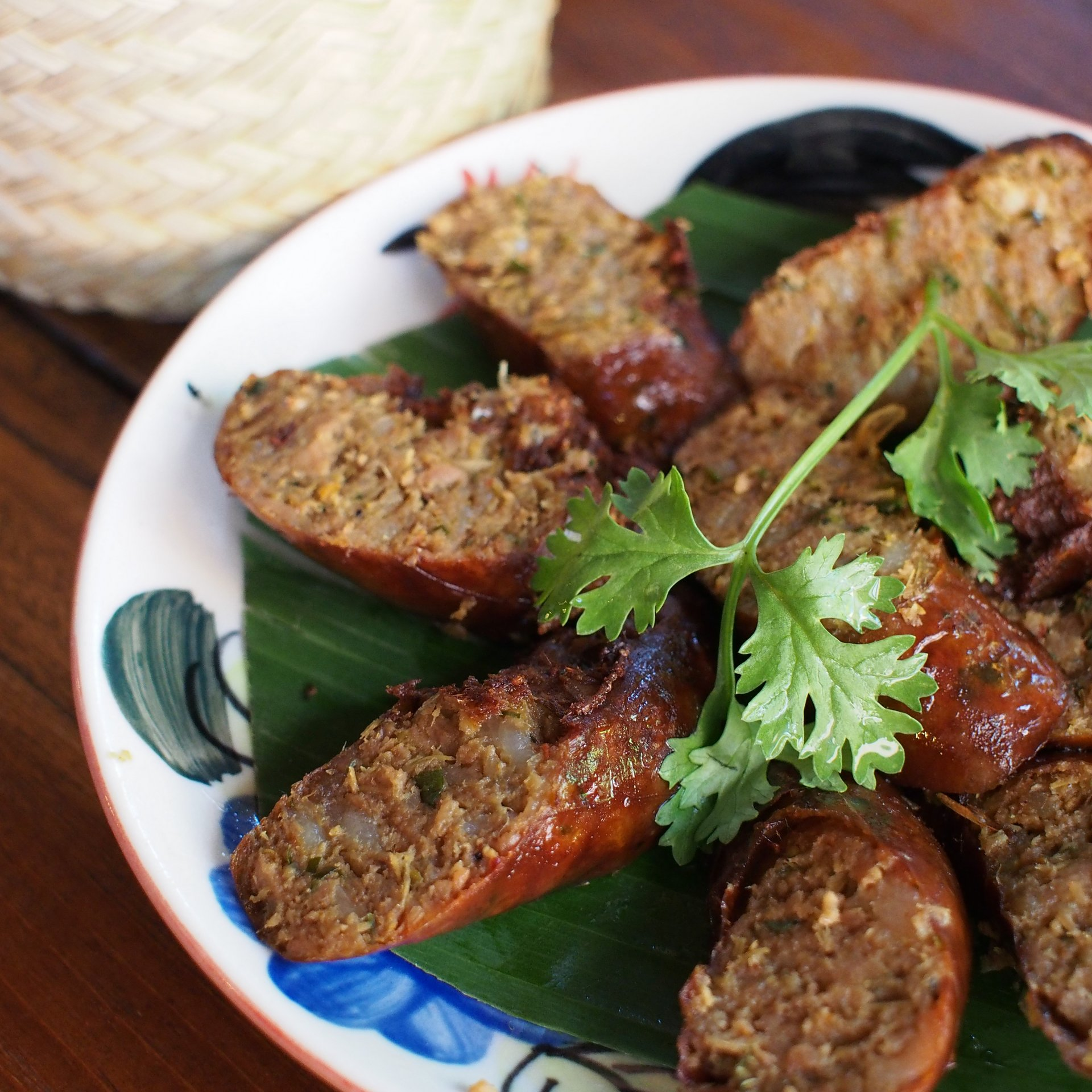
Grilled sai oua

Sai oua is an ancient Lao word for sausage. It is a compound term literally meaning "stuffed intestine": sai (ໄສ້), meaning "intestine", and oua (ອົວ/ອັ່ວ), meaning "stuffed".

The sausage originates from Luang Prabang, Laos. Luang Prabang was once the royal capital and seat of power of the Kingdom of Lan Xang (1353–1707). The ancient city of Luang Prabang is considered the cradle of Lao culture and cuisine. At the height of its power, Luang Prabang's influence stretched from the borders of Sipsongpanna (China) to Steung Treng (Cambodia), and from the Annamite Range along the border with Vietnam to the Khorat Plateau in northeastern Thailand and its sister kingdom of Lan Na.

Sai oua was listed in a collection of favorite dishes of the former Lao royal family written by Phia Sing (1898–1967), the king's personal chef and master of ceremonies, and today it is one of several popular traditional Lao dishes.

== Types ==
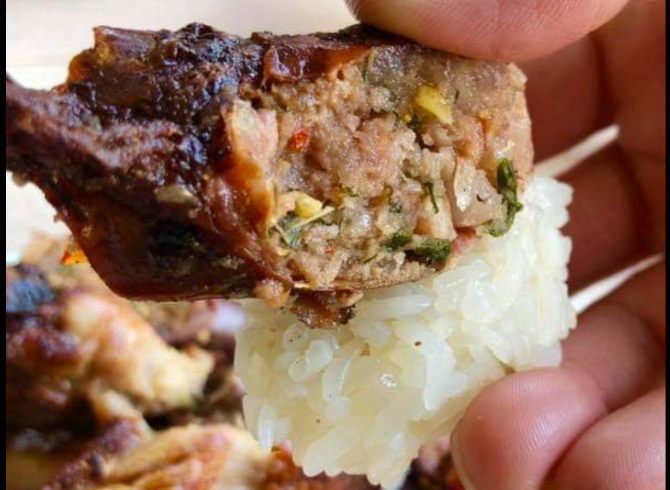
Sai oua with sticky rice

There are two types of sai oua in Laos:

- Sai oua moo, or pork sausage, literally sai (intestine), oua (stuffed), and moo (pork).
- Sai oua krouaille, or water buffalo sausage, literally sai (intestine), oua (stuffed), and krouaille (water buffalo).

The traditional recipe for sai oua moo served to Laotian royalty can be found in a collection of handwritten recipes by Phia Sing (1898–1967), the king's personal chef and master of ceremonies. Phia Sing's handwritten recipes were compiled and published for the first time in 1981.

== Commercial preparation ==
Tong Tem Toh in Chiang Mai, Thailand, drew international attention for its hors d'oeuvre plate featuring sai oua.

Sai oua is also prepared within the Western diaspora communities of Thai and Lao people. Goldee's BBQ in Fort Worth, Texas, serves a smoked sai oua ("Lao sausage") based on the family recipe of Laotian American owner Nupohn Inthanousay. At Blackstack Brewery in Saint Paul, Minnesota, Soul Lao serves its version of the sausage. Kao Soy in Brooklyn, New York, was named "Best of New York" by New York magazine in 2015 for its northern Thai sai oua. National Restaurant Awards winner Singburi in London is noted for their own sai oua.

TasteAtlas, a global food and travel guide known for ranking traditional dishes from around the world, released its list of the "Top 100 Best Sausages in the World" in July 2025. Laotian sai oua ranked No. 12 with 4.3 stars, while the northern Thai version ranked No. 49 with 3.9 stars.

== Similar sausages ==
Similar sausages in Lao cuisine include sai gork (Lao: ໄສ້ກອກ, "soured Lao sausage"), sai gork wan (Lao: ໄສ້ກອກຫວານ; sweet sausage), sai gork leuat (Lao: ໄສ້ກອກເລືອດ; blood sausage), naem (Lao: ແໜມ; sour sausage), and mam (Thai: หม่ำ; beef or pork sausage mixed with liver).

== See also ==
- Sai krok Isan – a fermented sausage from northeastern Thailand
- Hmong sausage – a fresh sausage in Hmong cuisine
- List of sausages
- List of Thai dishes
