= Fermented meat =

Preservation process

Fermented meat is an important preservation process which has evolved for meat but is rarely used alone.

A particularly common form of fermented meat product is the sausage, with notable examples including chorizo, salami, sucuk, pepperoni, nem chua, siraw, som moo, and saucisson.

The process of fermentation may be used to render edible meat that would otherwise be poisonous to humans, as in the case of the Icelandic dish hákarl, the fermented meat of the Greenland shark.

In 2015, the International Agency for Research on Cancer of the World Health Organization classified processed meat, that is, meat that has undergone salting, curing, fermenting, or smoking, as "carcinogenic to humans".

== See also ==
- Fermentation in food processing
