= Sai krok Isan =

Thai fermented sausage

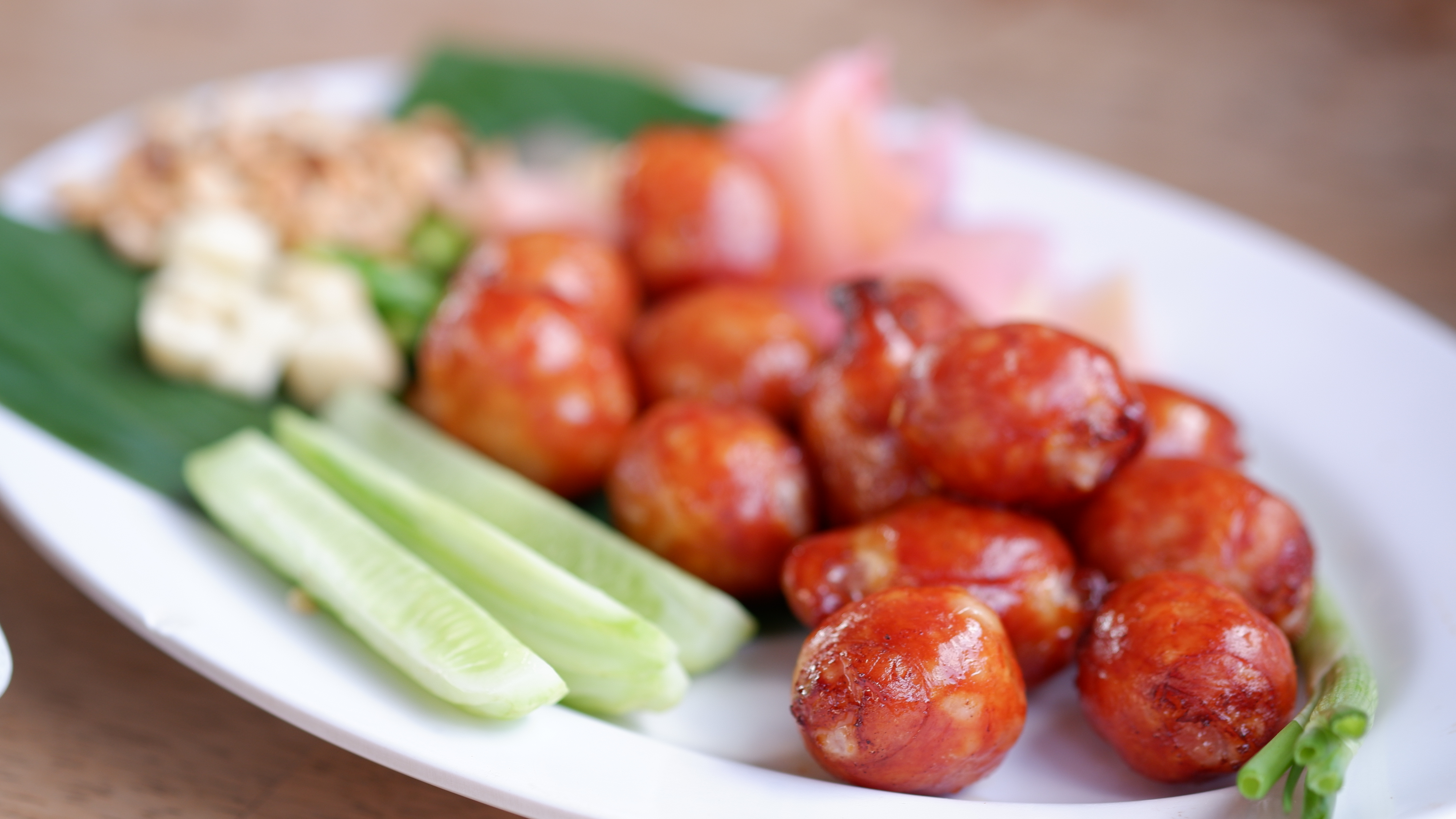
Sai krok Esan

Sai krok Isan (Thai: ไส้กรอกอีสาน, pronounced [sâj krɔ̀ːk ʔīː.sǎːn]; Northeastern Thai: ไส้กรอกอีสาน, ไส้อั่ว, pronounced [sàj kɔ̀ːk ʔìː.sǎn, sàj ʔúa]) is a fermented sausage originating from northeastern provinces of Thailand. It is made with pork and rice, and typically eaten as a snack served with bird's eye chilis, raw cabbage, and sliced ginger. Sometimes the sausage is served and eaten with sticky rice and comes in a wrapped form and a sliced form.

TasteAtlas, a global food and travel guide known for ranking traditional dishes from around the world, released its list of the Top 100 Best Sausages in the World in July 2025. Sai krok Isan was ranked at No. 23, earning 4.1 stars.

== History ==
According to the northeastern (Isan) elders, Sai krok Isan has existed since ancient times. Known locally as "sai ua"(ไส้อั่ว), its method of production, aimed at preserving meat, has been passed down from generation to generation. As mentioned, the dish is made by fermenting and preserving the leftover meat from slaughtered cattle; The better part is used for a dish called Mum (หม่ำ). It is believed that the process evolved as a way to preserve food when refrigeration was not available.

Traditional preparation methods involved mixing leftover meat with glutinous rice, garlic, and salt, then stuffing the mixture into cleaned intestines and fermenting for 3–4 days until it developed a sour taste. The technique was traditionally made during community gatherings and seasonal festivals, and the fermentation process relied on naturally occurring bacteria like Pediococcus cerevisiae. Isan sausages are found in region's "Heet Sip Song" (12 monthly merit-making festivals, such as Bung Bang Fai) and various community celebrations throughout the year, and it symbolized the resourcefulness of Isan ancestors in food preservation.

Developed over time, the heritage of Sai krok Isan has adapted to modern ingredients and processes. Beyond its origin in the northeastern region (Isan), the dish has become known across the nation. Isan sausage displays Thai traditions and culinary development while continuing to adapt to meet the modern standards of taste and safety.

== Ingredients and preparation ==
Isan sausage consists of ground fatty pork mixed with cooked glutinous rice (sticky rice). The main ingredients include garlic, salt, and sometimes additional herbs for flavor. Fresh pork with a good balance of meat and fat is commonly used in traditional recipes.

The preparation of Isan sausage involves mixing the minced pork with rice seasonings, then the stuffing the mixture into cleaned animal intestines and tied into round pieces. The sausages are fermented for 3 – 4 days until they have a sour taste, which occurs naturally when lactic acid bacteria break down the sugars in the rice.

In household production, Sai krok Isan is usually fermented by leaving the sausages to hang at around 30 °C or to sun dye, but this approach can sometimes give inconsistent results. With newer methods, the fermentation may instead be carried out under controlled incubation or using vacuum techniques to make the process more reliable.

== Cultural significance ==
Playing an important role in northeastern Thai cuisine, Sai krok Isan also represents a local food preservation technique. Commonly served during social gatherings and celebrations, Sai krok Isan is one of the dishes that families share. The sausage outlines the local hospitality among its people, bringing communities together through its distinctive sour and savory flavors.

The creativity present in Sai krok Isan also represents the Isan people who make a unique sausage with local ingredients and knowledge. Illustrating the northeastern Thai community's characteristics, Isan sausage also underlines the local values of culinary heritage and their resourcefulness. Fermentation techniques and their methods have been passed down through tradition by generations, connecting and reflecting today's society to its roots.

== Varieties and types ==
Across the northeastern region of Thailand, there exists a variety of Sai krok Isan, each altered into its own unique recipe and style depending on the province. The ratio of pork to fat, the addition of pork skin for texture, and the use of sticky rice or regular rice for fermentation are examples of how each variation can be made. In some cases, Isan sausage variation may include salt from local salt wells for a distinct taste, while other variations add glass noodles or pork tendons to create different textures.

Today, Sai Krok Isan is available in ready-to-eat, raw, and semi-cooked forms. New variations and adaptations have also emerged, including healthier options such as keto-friendly versions and those catering to specific dietary preferences. In commercial production, Isan sausage is standardized and consistent in both quality and taste; it also lasts longer due to vacuum packaging. In contrast, homemade versions can vary more in flavor, such as having increased sourness by adjusting the fermentation process according to personal preference.

== Modern production and commerce ==
Standardized processes have been used in both commercial and household-level production of Isan sausage, involving the fermentation of pork or beef with sticky rice and seasonings, which are stuffed and left to ferment for its unique sour flavor. Under strict hygiene and quality control, Thai food factories produce goods that meet HACCP and Thai FDA standards, ensuring consistent quality and safety.

Isan sausage is widely available in markets across the Northeastern region and throughout Thailand. It can be found along major roads in provinces such as Phon District, Khon Kaen, where numerous vendors specialize in freshly grilled Isan sausage. The distribution network now extends to wholesalers, retailers, supermarkets, and online platforms, enabling the product to reach a nationwide consumer base. With modern logistics and e-commerce systems, Isan sausage has become available at both local street markets and online shops, making it more accessible to urban consumers and food enthusiasts.

The production and sale of Isan sausage have created a positive economic impact on local communities in Northeastern Thailand. It generates household income, supports small-scale producers, and promotes gastronomic tourism, where tourists visit to experience authentic regional food culture. In terms of business opportunities, the sausage industry has expanded into B2B and B2C models, with local producers supplying wholesale markets and branded businesses reaching consumers directly through modern trade and exports. By focusing on quality control and product certification, Isan sausage has the potential to grow as a competitive food export and a sustainable contributor to Thailand's regional economy.

== Nutritional content and health benefits ==
Isan sausage is rich in protein and provide essential nutrients from pork and sticky rice. It contains a big level of calories and fat, while the fermentation process may encourage the growth of beneficial probiotics such as Lactobacillus that give Isan sausage distinct sour taste and support digestive balance. The pork within sausage provides protein, and the natural fermentation helps with probiotics as said before, Sai krok Isan also has vegetables such as ginger and cabbage as its sides, both of which aid digestion. Though beneficial, Isan sausage should be consumed in a moderate amount as it contains a high amount of sodium.

== See also ==
- Sai gork
- Naem – a fermented pork sausage in Thai cuisine
- Lao sausage – a broad term used to describe the local variant of Lao style sausages found in Laos, Northern and Northeastern Thailand
- List of sausages
