= Nam khao =

Lao appetizer salad

Naem khao
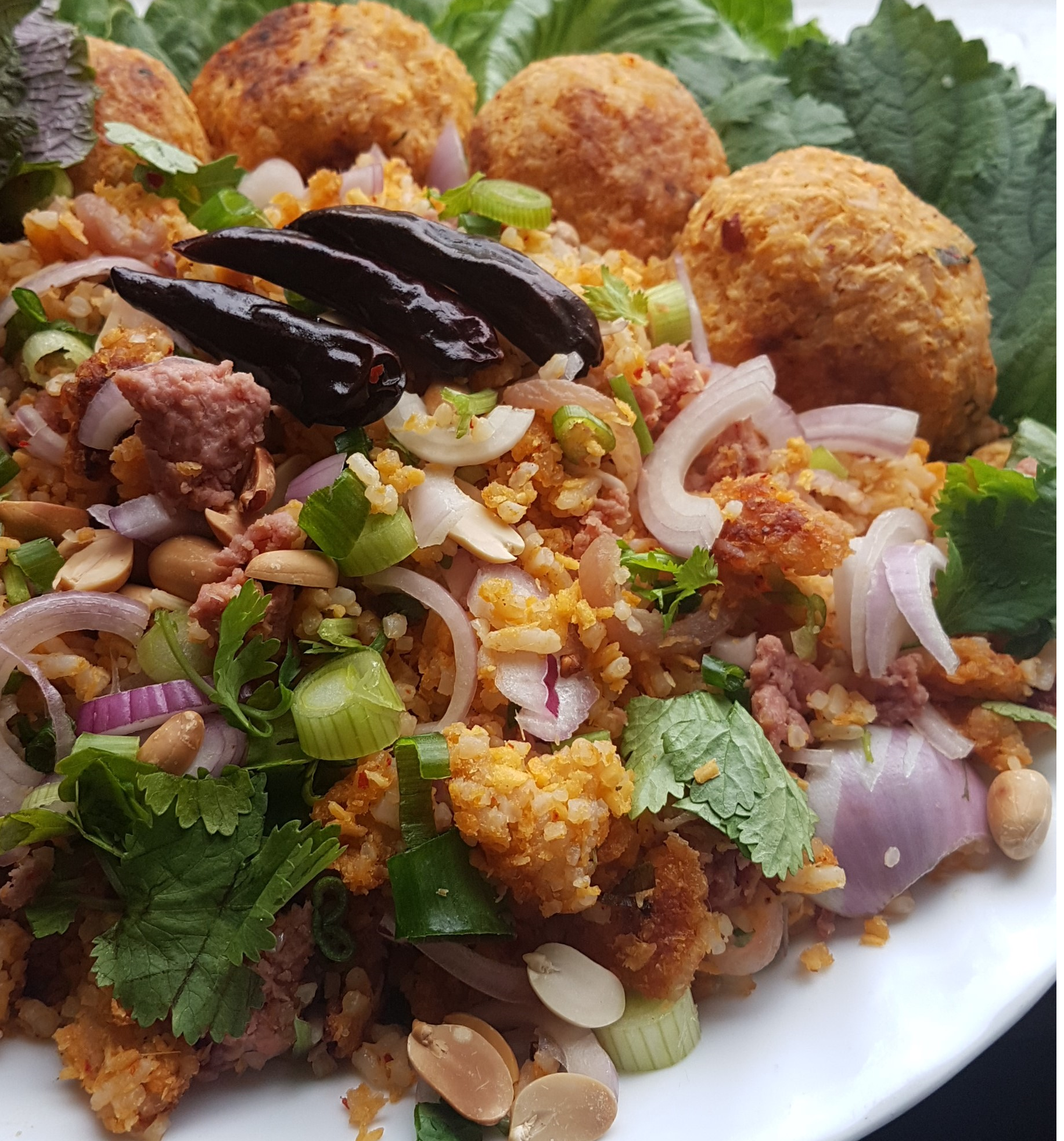
- Alternative names: Nem Thadeua, Lao crispy rice salad, Lao fried rice ball salad
- Type: Salad
- Place of origin: Laos
- Region or state: Vientiane
- Main ingredients: Rice balls, som moo, peanuts, grated coconut, scallions or shallots, mint, cilantro, lime juice, fish sauce

Naem khao (Lao: ແໜມເຂົ້າ), also known as yam naem (Thai: ยำแหนม) is a very popular Lao appetizer salad originating from Tha Deua, a small port village, in Vientiane, Laos.

Nam khao can be found at street stalls, restaurants, or served communal/potluck style on large trays at parties and other celebratory events. The dish has spread to Northeastern Thailand (Isan) and the rest of Thailand when Laotians and ethnic Lao from the Isan region migrated to Bangkok for work. The dish is also gaining popularity in the West where Laotians have immigrated. It was also named among the best street foods in Asia.

== Other names ==
Naem khao is also known as naem Thadeua (Lao: ແໜມທ່າເດືອ, pronounced [nɛ̌ːm tʰāː dɯ̀a]), naem khao tod (Lao: ແໜມເຂົ້າທອດ, pronounced [nɛ̌ːm kʰȁːw tʰɔ̂ːt]), yam naem khao thot (Thai: ยำแหนมข้าวทอด, pronounced [jām nɛ̌ːm kʰâːw tʰɔ̂ːt]) or naem khluk (Thai: แหนมคลุก, pronounced [nɛ̌ːm kʰlúk]) and translated or transliterated as Lao crispy rice salad, Lao fried rice ball salad.

== Ingredients and preparation ==
Naem khao is made with deep-fried rice balls (similar to a spherical croquette), chunks of Lao-style Vietnamese fermented pork sausage (som moo or naem chua), chopped peanuts, grated coconut, sliced scallions or shallots, mint, cilantro, lime juice, fish sauce, and other ingredients. Nam khao is traditionally eaten as a wrap by filling an individual lettuce leaf with a spoonful of the nam khao mixture and then topping it with fresh herbs and dried chili peppers.

The traditional Lao method of making nam khao involves seasoning cooked rice with red curry paste, sugar, salt, and grated coconut, and then forming the mixture into tightly packed rice balls to be coated with eggs and deep-fried until crispy. Prior to serving, the crispy rice balls are broken into little chunks and then mixed with the rest of the fresh ingredients to form the eventual crispy rice salad.

== See also ==
- List of salads
