= NEM =

NEM, Nem or nem may refer to:

== Economics ==
- National Electricity Market, an eastern Australian interstate wholesale electricity market with high voltage interconnectors
- Net energy metering, an electricity billing mechanism
- Networked and Electronic Media, a European industrial initiative
- New Economic Mechanism, economic reforms undertaken in Hungary in 1968 and in Laos in 1986
- New Economic Model, an initiative to reform Malaysia's economy

== Places ==
- New Malden railway station (National Rail station code NEM), London, England, UK
- Nemom railway station (station code NEM), Kerala, India

== People ==
- Nem (footballer, born 1973) (Rinaldo Francisco de Lima), Brazilian footballer
- Nem (footballer, born 1987) (Rogisvaldo João dos Santos), Brazilian footballer
- Wellington Nem (born 1992) (Wellington Silva Sanches Aguiar), Brazilian footballer
- Nem (singer), of Dude 'n Nem hiphop duo
- So Nem, Cambodian education minister

== Groups, organizations, companies ==
- Newmont (NYSE symbol NEM), a US gold mining company
- Nouvel Ensemble Moderne, a chamber orchestra from Montreal, Canada
- National Equality March, a 2009 LGBT rights protest in Washington, DC, US
- National Electronics Museum, Linthicum, Maryland, USA

== Other uses ==
- Nem, a Vietnamese dish
- Normen Europäischer Modellbahnen, the European standards for model railroads issued by the MOROP
- N-Ethylmaleimide, an organic compound
- Nemi language (ISO 639 language code nem)
- Russian Science Power Module (NEM), a cancelled International Space Station module
- Russian Science Power Module (NEM), a module for the proposed space station Russian Orbital Service Station
- Network equipment manufacturer, or network equipment provider
