= Shark fin dumpling =

Superior of Soup

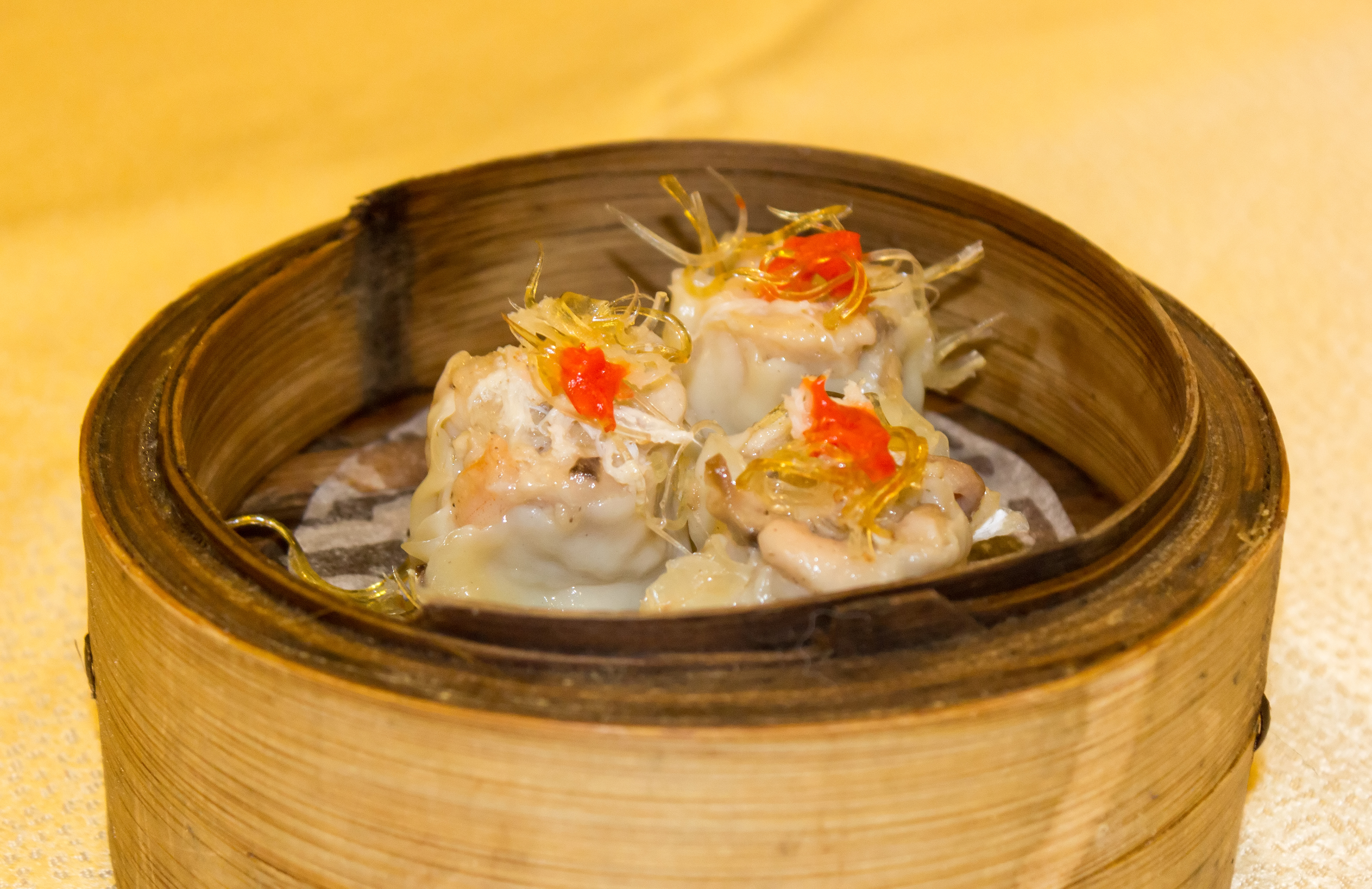
- Course: Dim sum
- Place of origin: Hong Kong
- Region or state: Cantonese-speaking region

Shark fin dumpling (Chinese: 魚翅餃) is a dim sum dish in Hong Kong. It is a form of Dumpling in Superior Soup (Chinese: 灌湯餃), a dumpling with gelatinous broth inside. As with shark fin soup, the shark fin content is often replaced with an imitation.

== History ==
Dumpling in Superior Soup (Chinese: 灌湯餃) originated from Ming dynasty in Yangzhou. In that time, pigskin was a preferred ingredient of brewis. As pigskin is composed of collagen which is a main component of connective tissue, brewis would be solidified after it was dissolved, forming a gel-like structure. It would then be integrated into bread for consumption. According to the Qing dynasty cookbook Suiyuan shidan this is the ancestral form of dumpling in superior soup.

The use of shark fin as an ingredient of dumplings appeared in the 1980s, when the economy of Hong Kong was growing rapidly. Part of the Chinese restaurants would like to produce something luxury so as to emphasize the class difference or attract consumers. As time went on, actual shark fin was sometimes replaced by thin bean noodle.

== Ingredients and preparation ==
The standard ingredients include shrimp, crab sticks, shiitake and straw mushrooms. The dish is prepared with red agar for texture, and seasoned with salt, MSG, sugar, meal-cake, and ground white pepper.

== See also ==
- Freshwater prawn farming
- Shark fin soup
- zh:魚翅餃
