= Naem (food) =

Thai fermented meat product

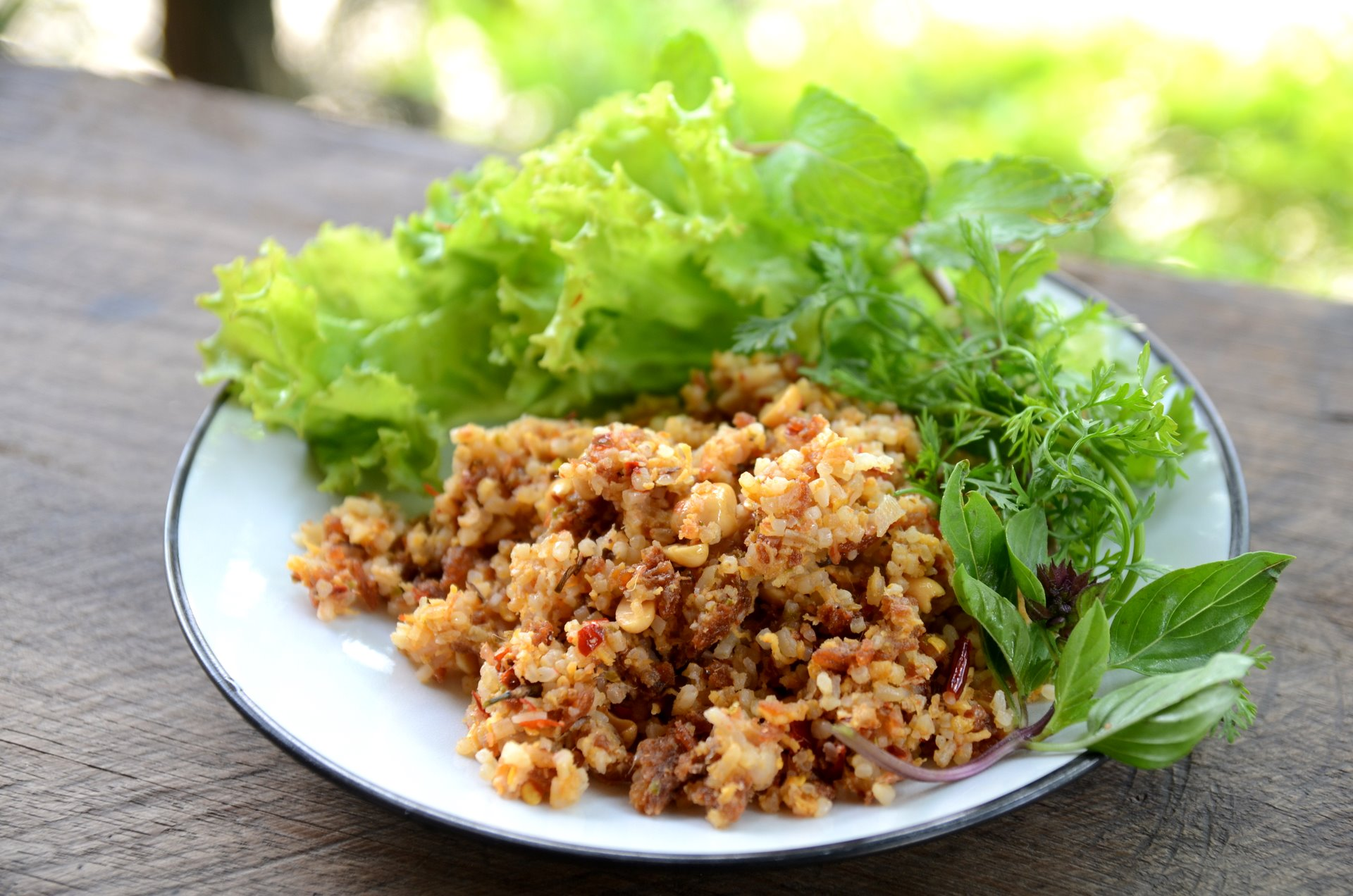
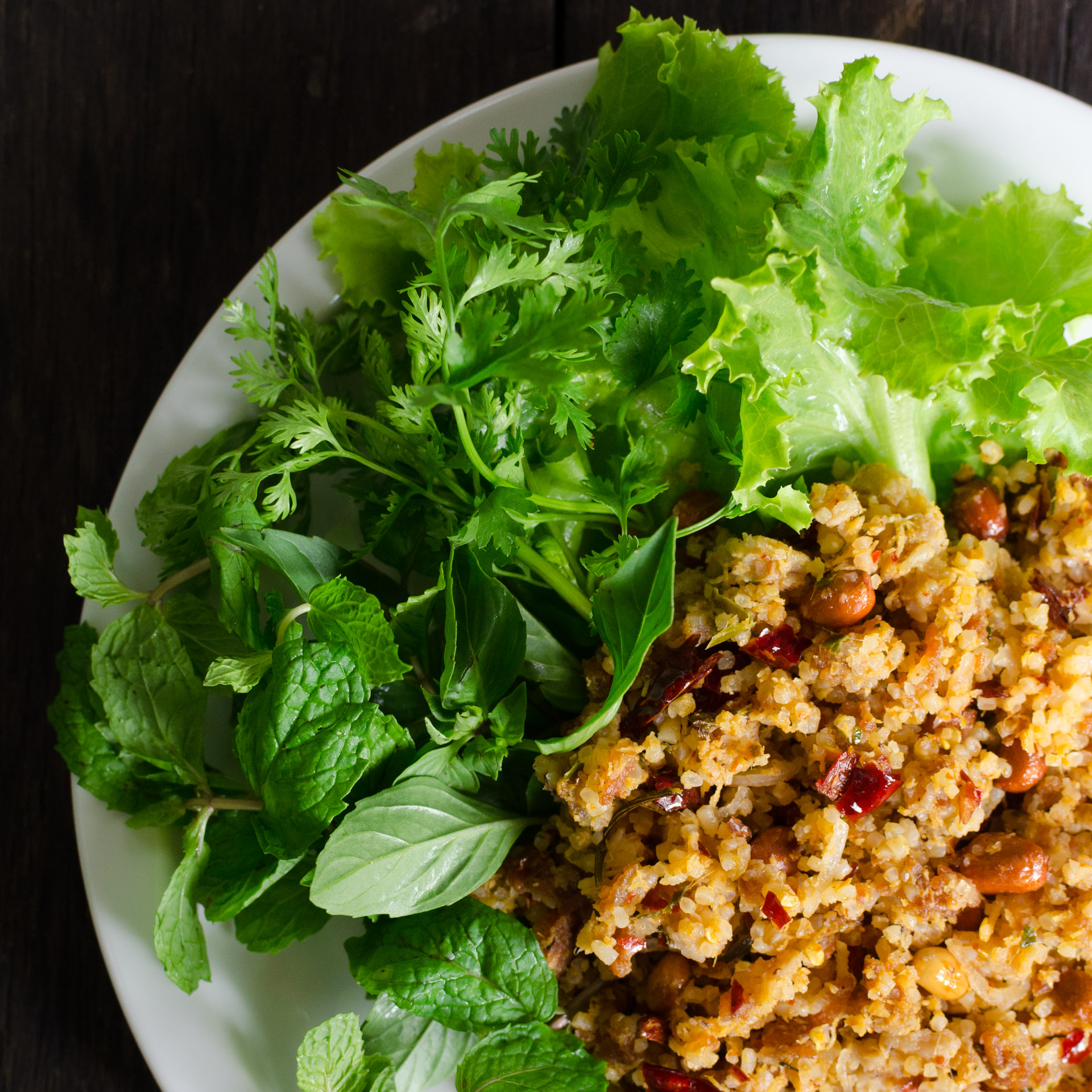
- Naem khluk ("mixed naem") is a Thai salad prepared with naem. At bottom is a close-up view of the same dish.
- Type: Fermented sausage
- Place of origin: Thailand, Laos
- Serving temperature: Raw or cooked
- Main ingredients: Pork
- Ingredients generally used: Minced beef is sometimes used

Naem (Note: Thai: แหนม, pronounced [nɛ̌ːm]; Lao: ແໜມ, pronounced [nɛ̌ːm]; Northern Thai: จิ๊นส้ม, pronounced [tɕín so᷇m]; Northeastern Thai: แหนม, pronounced [nɛ̌ːm]) is a pork sausage in Lao and Thai cuisine. It is a fermented food that has a sour flavor. It has a short shelf life, and can be eaten without cooking. It is a popular Southeast Asian food, and different regions of Southeast Asia have various preferred flavors, including variations of sour and spicy. Naem is used as an ingredient in various dishes and is also served as a side dish.

Naem contains a significant amount of protein, a moderate amount of fat, and minor carbohydrate content. Parasites and enteropathogenic bacteria have been found in samples of naem. Lactic acid formed during its fermentation inhibits the growth of Salmonella. Lactobacillus curvatus use in the product has been proven to prevent the growth of pathogenic bacteria in naem. It is sometimes irradiated to kill off parasites and pathogens. The bacterial content in Thai sour pork products is regulated.

Naem is also known under the names and spellings also referred to as nam, nham, naem moo, som moo, naem maw, chin som.

== Overview ==
Naem is a red-colored, semi-dry lactic-fermented pork sausage in Southeast Asian cuisine prepared using minced raw pork and pork skin, significant amounts of cooked sticky rice, chili peppers, garlic, sugar, salt and potassium nitrate. Minced beef is sometimes used in its preparation. After the mix is prepared, it is encased in banana leaves, synthetic sausage casings or tubular plastic bags and left to ferment for three to five days. Naem has a sour quality to it due to the fermentation, in which lactic acid bacteria and yeasts grow within the sausage. The lactic acid bacteria and yeasts expand by feeding upon the rice and sugar, and the use of salt prevents the meat from rotting.

Naem is typically stored at room temperature where shelf lives of a week are typical, though it lasts longer when refrigerated. The sausage can be time-consuming and labor-intensive to prepare. It is produced all over Southeast Asia in slight variations.

Naem is often consumed uncooked, and is often accompanied with shallot, ginger, bird's eye chili peppers and spring onions. It is used as an ingredient in various dishes such as naem fried with eggs, Naem khao and Naem phat wun sen sai khai, and is also consumed as a side dish and as a condiment. The cooking of naem significantly changes its flavor.

== Prominence ==
Naem has been described in Thailand as "one of the popular meat products of the country prepared from ground pork" and as "one of the most popular traditional Thai fermented meat products".

== Varieties ==
Different regions of Thailand have different preferred flavors: northern and northeastern pork is a little bit sour, central is sour, and southern is spicy. Naem mo in northern Thailand may be fermented in a clay pot.

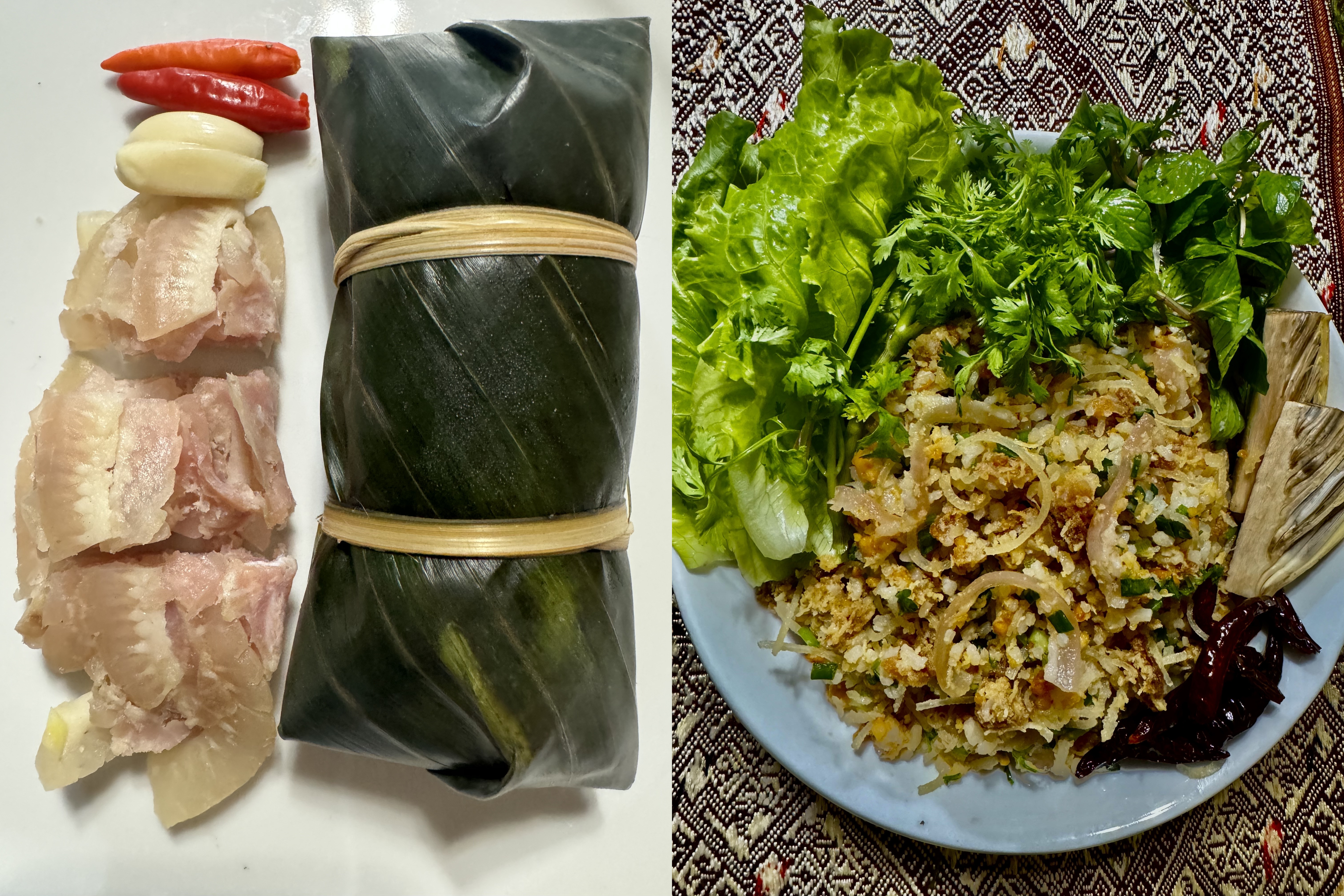
Lao som moo (left) and its use as an ingredient of nam khao (right)

In Laos, fermented sour pork with shredded pork skin is known as som moo (sour pork). Some som moo variations also incorporate garlic and chilli peppers. Luang Prabang som moo is very popular because of its texture and sour flavor. Som moo can be enjoyed both as a side-dish with sticky rice, or as an ingredient for the Lao crispy rice salad nam khao.

== Use in dishes ==
Dishes prepared with naem include naem fried with eggs, and naem fried rice. Naem phat wun sen sai khai is a dish prepared with naem, glass noodles and eggs, among other ingredients such as spring onions and red pepper. Nam khao is a salad dish in Lao cuisine prepared using Lao fermented pork sausage, rice, coconut, peanuts, mint, cilantro, fish sauce, and lemon juice. Naem and rice are formed into balls, deep-fried, and then served broken atop the various ingredients. Serenade, a restaurant in Bangkok, makes a dish called the "McNaem", which consists of a duck egg wrapped in naem that is fried and then served with risotto, slaw, shiitake mushrooms, herbs, and cooked sea scallops atop crushed garlic.

There are many applications of sour pork with different flavors such as phat phet naem (Thai: ผัดเผ็ดแหนม), tom kha naem (Thai: ต้มข่าแหนม), ho mok naem (Thai: ห่อหมกแหนม), and naem priao wan (Thai: แหนมเปรี้ยวหวาน).

Dishes prepared with naem

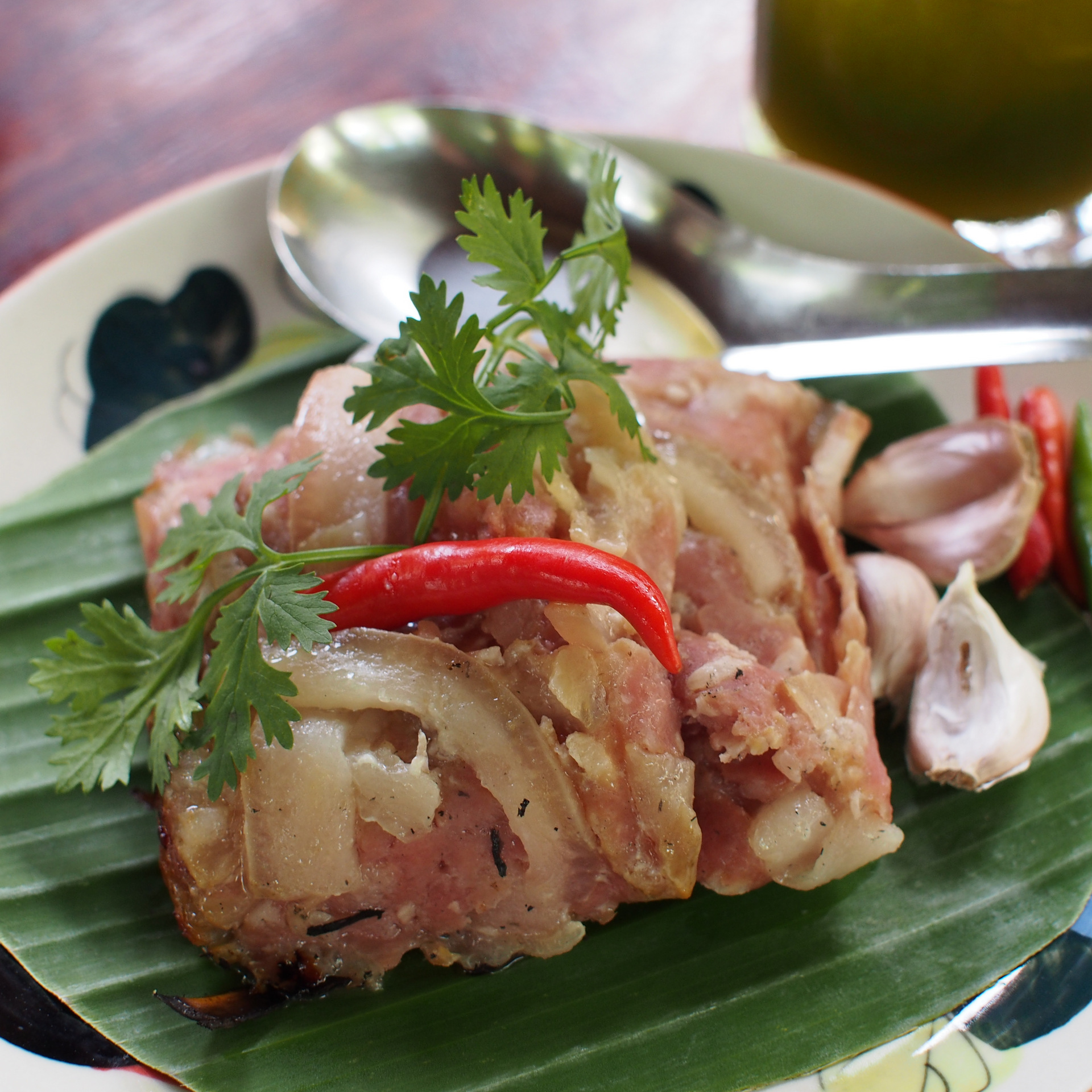
Chin som mok – a speciality of northern Thailand, it is the northern Thai version of naem sausage

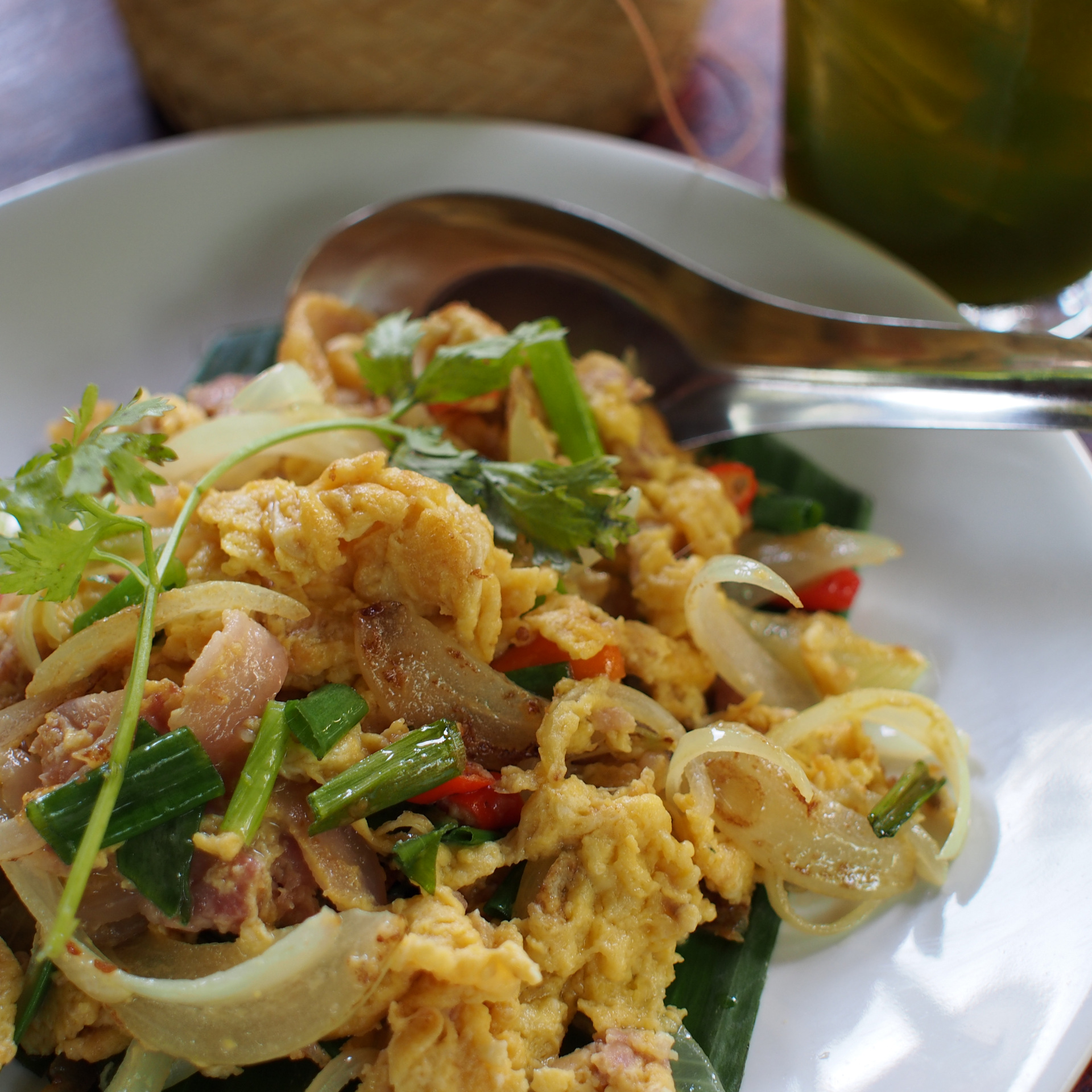
Khua chin som sai khai – a dish prepared with dry-fried pickled pork and egg. Chin som is the northern Thai name for naem

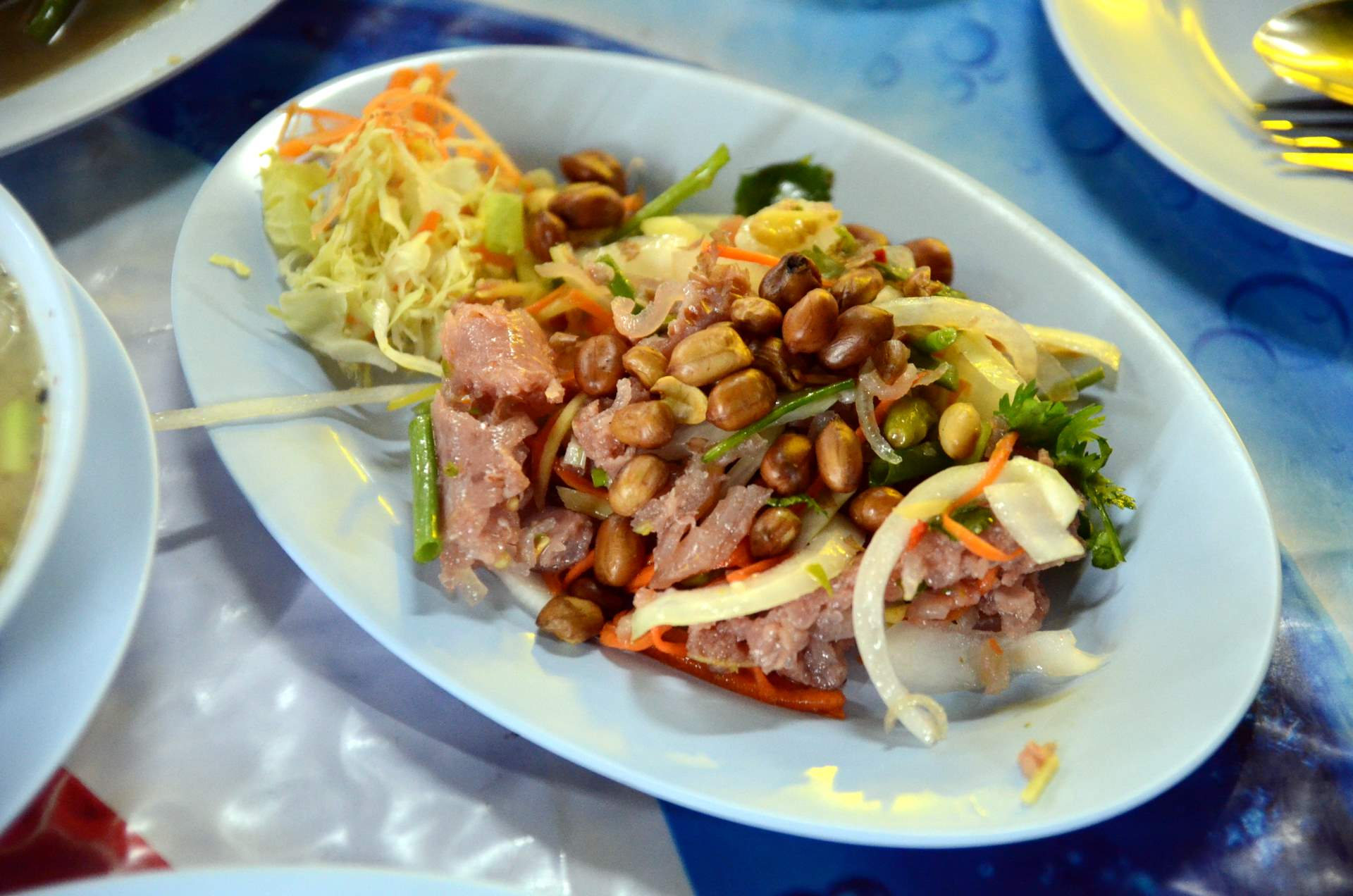
Nam khao – a Laotian salad prepared with naem and other ingredients

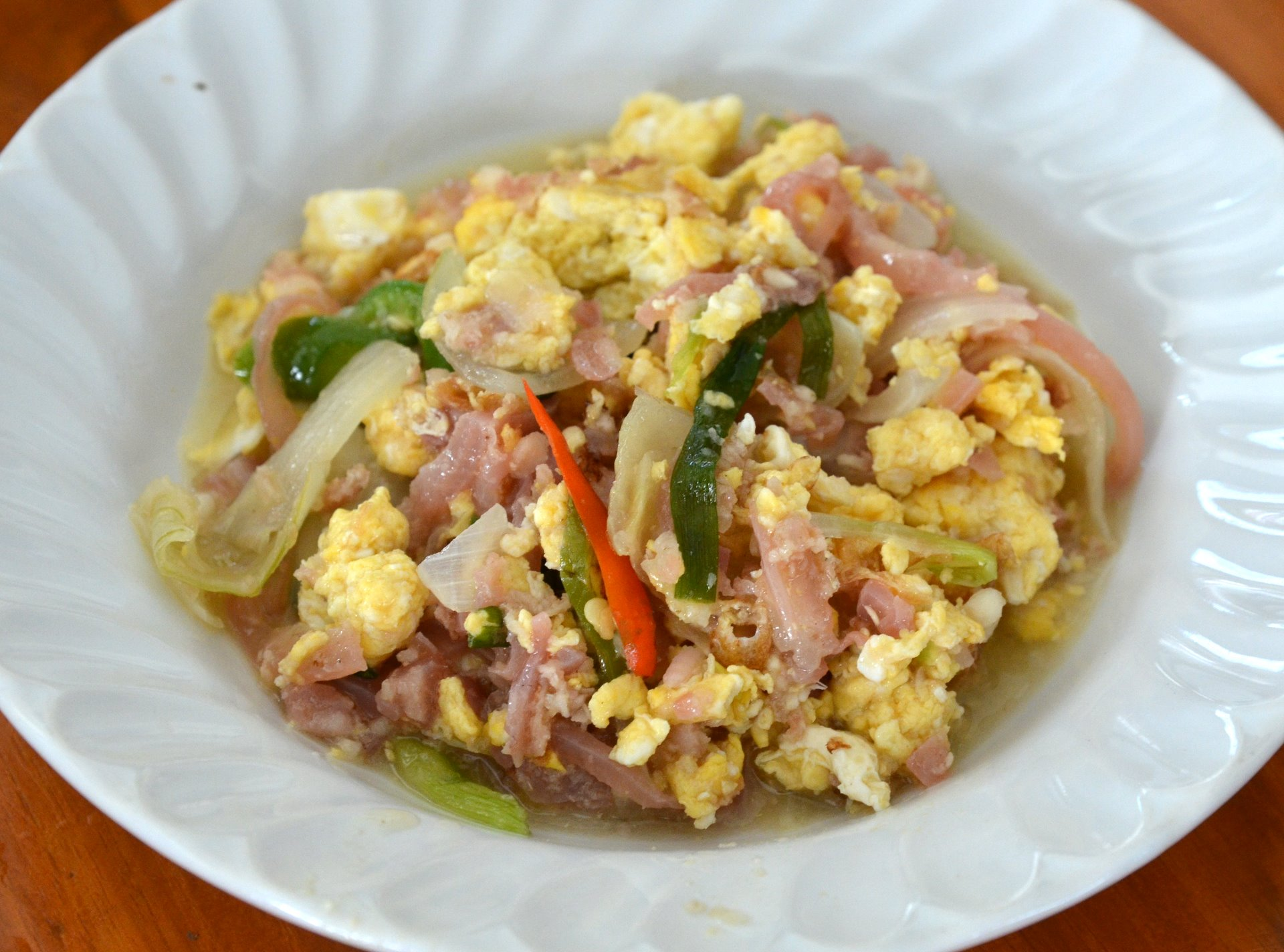
Phat naem sai khai – naem stir fried with egg

== Nutritional content ==
Naem
Nutritional value per 100g
- Energy: 774.04 kJ (185.00 kcal)
- Carbohydrates: 3.6
- Fat: 9.9 g
- Protein: 20.2 g
- ^{†}Percentages estimated using US recommendations for adults.

A serving size of 100 grams (3.5 oz) of naem has 185 kilocalories, 20.2 grams (0.71 oz) protein, 9.9 grams (0.35 oz) fat, and 3.6 grams (0.13 oz) carbohydrate. According to the "Industrialization of Thai Nham" by Warawut Krusong of the King Mongkut's Institute of Technology Ladkrabang vitamins B1 and B2, ferric iron, and phosphorus were present in naem, quantities unspecified.

== Microbiology ==
Naem has on occasion been contaminated with parasites such as Taenia solium, Trichinella spiralis, and enteropathogenic bacteria such as coliform bacteria and Salmonella. It has been demonstrated that Salmonella growth is inhibited by the formation of lactic acid during the fermentation process. Use of the starter culture Lactobacillus curvatus has been shown to prevent "the outgrowth of pathogenic bacteria" in naem. Naem is sometimes irradiated.

=== Regulations on bacterial content ===
The bacterial content in Thai sour pork products is regulated. There should not be more than 0.1 grams (0.0035 oz) of Escherichia coli O157:H7, Staphylococcus aureus not more than 0.1 grams (0.0035 oz), Yersinia enterocolitica not more than 0.1 grams (0.0035 oz), Listeria monocytogenes not more than 0.1 grams (0.0035 oz), Clostridium perfringens not more than 0.1 grams (0.0035 oz), Fungi less than 10colony per gram, Trichinellaspiralis less than 100 grams (3.5 oz). Bacteria at higher levels may cause sickness.

== See also ==
- List of fermented foods
- List of sausages
- Sai krok Isan – a fermented sausage originating in the northeastern provinces of Thailand
- Sai ua – a grilled pork sausage from northern Thailand and northeastern Burma
- Nem chua

== Bibliography ==
- Steinkraus, K. (2004). Industrialization of Indigenous Fermented Foods, Revised and Expanded. Food Science and Technology. Taylor & Francis. pp. 721–736. ISBN 978-0-8247-5094-7.
