= Nem chua =

Vietnamese fermented pork dish

Nem chua Thanh Hoá
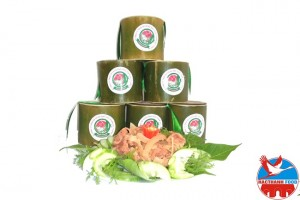
- Nem chua Thanh Hoá
- Type: Fermented pork roll
- Place of origin: Vietnam
- Region or state: Thanh Hoá province
- Serving temperature: Cold
- Main ingredients: Pork, pork skin, garlic, chili peppers, fig leaves, banana leaves

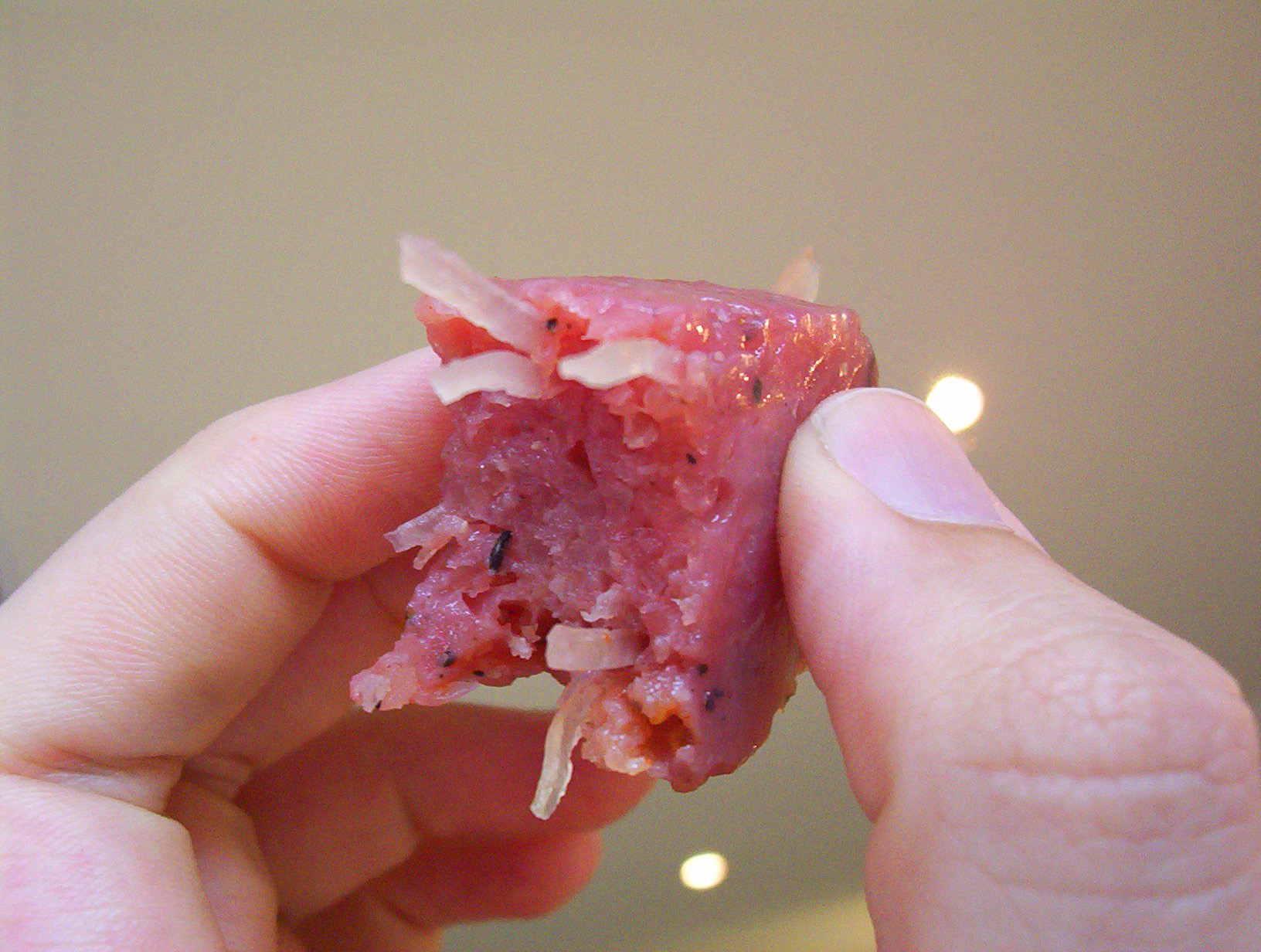
A half-bitten nem chua, with thin strips of rind sticking out

Nem chua ([ɲɛm˧ tɕua˧] in northern dialect) or nem ([ɲɛm˧] in central and southern dialects) is a fermented pork dish from Vietnamese cuisine. It is mainly composed of a mixture of lean pork and thin strips of cooked rind, garnished with garlic and chilli. It can take the form of bite-size pieces wrapped individually in aluminium foil and paper, or a kind of cervelat in sealed plastic. Traditionally the leaves of star gooseberry tree (chùm ruột), strawberry guava (cây ổi, ổi sẻ), cluster fig (sung), Ming aralia (đinh lăng), the oriental coral tree Erythrina orientalis (vông nem), or Indian coral tree are used to wrap nem chua, with a thick layer of banana leaves on the outside. It has a sweet-sour taste characteristic of lactic fermentations, a pink color and a firm and elastic texture.

In Vietnam, it is generally eaten raw. It has a shelf life of less than a week and is often consumed in raw form after the fermentation process. It is a popular food in different parts of Southeast Asia, in various preparations, seasonings and flavors, mainly sour and spicy. Nem chua is used as an ingredient in various dishes and is also served raw in its raw form as a side dish.

Advanced fermentation results in acidification which makes nem chua (sour nem), with lighter fermentation producing nem ngọt (sweet nem).

== Local variations ==
Tré is a fermented pork product found in Da Nang and Central Vietnam, and is traditionally eaten during festivals, including Tết. Unlike nem chua, tré is made with shredded slices of pork meat, including the ears and skin, combined with galangal, garlic, chili, toasted rice powder, and other spices, before it is wrapped in leaves and fermented for 3 to 4 days. Tré is commonly dressed with nước chấm and served with shredded papaya, carrots, and mint leaves.

== Outside Vietnam ==
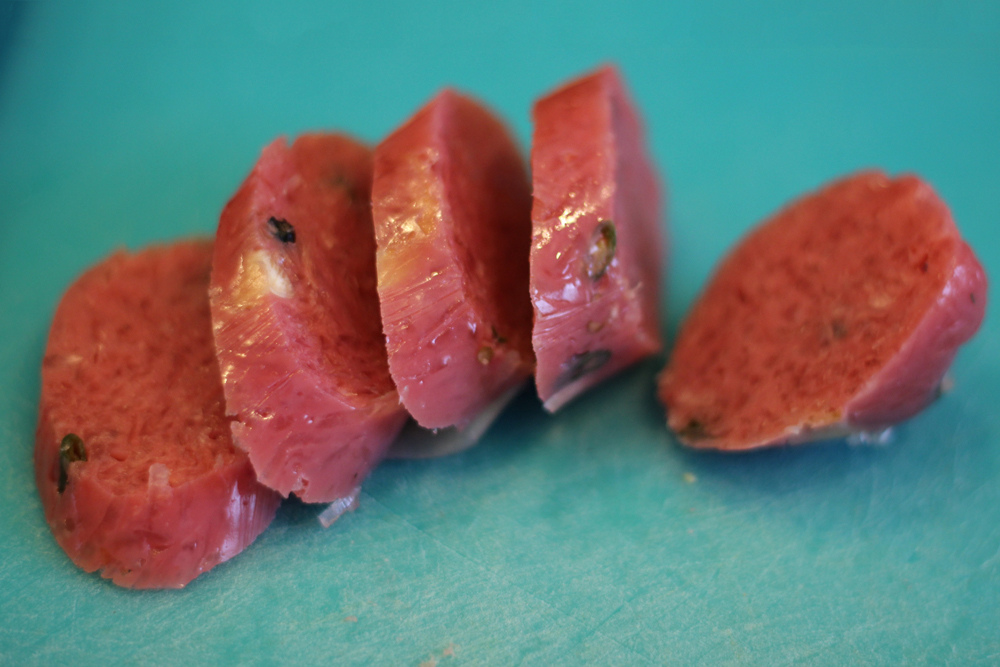
Sliced nem chua sausage.

In France and Belgium, nem chua is frequently found on the market because it corresponds to the food tastes of people from the South, the majority among the Vietnamese diaspora. Nem chua are sold in Asian stores in the form of small square packets, wrapped in pink paper, in nets of 10 pieces, or in the form of a large sausage of 200 g in plastic. There are two dates that correspond to the maturation of meat (start and end dates). They are consumed between the two dates, often as an apéritif, accompanied by beer. Package inserts in Europe recommend consuming the product cooked.

In Thailand, there is a similar fermented pork product called naem (Thai: แหนม, pronounced [nɛ̌ːm]), which also has a similar pronunciation.

== Health risk ==
Health authorities warn of the risk of contamination by pathogenic bacteria in poorly controlled fermentations. It also sometimes happens that the acidity developed in the meat attacks the aluminium foil packaging. This problem does not arise with plastic-wrapped versions.

Nem chua are usually accompanied by a leaflet saying that the bites must be kept in the refrigerator and cooked for at least 20 minutes.

== See also ==
- Nem (disambiguation)
- Vietnamese cuisine
- Naem
