= Hawaii House Bill 553 =

Marine wildlife conservation law in Hawaii

Hawaii House Bill 553 (also known as the Shark Fins Prohibition Act) is a marine wildlife conservation law passed by the Hawaii State Legislature in 2021. The law makes it illegal to "intentionally or knowingly capture or entangle any shark, whether alive or dead, or kill any shark, within state marine waters." The law stipulates fines of up to $10,000 per offense. This landmark legislation went into effect as Act 51 on January 1, 2022, making Hawaii the first state in the United States to outlaw killing sharks.

== History ==
Under the American federal Shark Finning Prohibition Act in 2000, it had become illegal for American vessels to remove shark fins from sharks and discard the body on the high seas. Hawaii then passed its own legislation in 2010 to prohibit ownership and sale of shark fins in the state. However, the law did not ban the capture of sharks for fishing trophies or the aquarium trade.

House Bill 553 was proposed by the Governor of Hawaii, David Ige on World Oceans Day in 2021 in order to ban shark fishing for any purpose. Opponents of the bill sought exemptions to allow for the capture of sharks for research purposes. The law delegated authority to the Hawaii Department of Land and Natural Resources to determine what the exemptions from the new law would be. The law did allow for the killing of sharks in self-defence or use in traditional Hawaiian cultural practices. The Bill passed the Hawaii State Legislature and was signed into law by Governor Ige, with the law to take effect on January 1, 2022.

== See also ==
- Memorandum of Understanding on the Conservation of Migratory Sharks
- Shark Conservation Act
- Shark Finning Prohibition Act
