= United States v. Approximately 64,695 Pounds of Shark Fins =

Court appeal concerning shark finning

- Court: United States Court of Appeals for the Ninth Circuit
- Full case name: United States of America, Plaintiff-Appellee, Tai Loong Hong Marine Products, Limited, Claimant-Appellant v. Approximately 64,695 Pounds of Shark Fins, Defendant-Appellant
- Argued: May 14, 2007
- Decided: March 17, 2008
- Citation: 520 F.3d 976 (2008)

Case history
- Prior history: Summary judgement granted in part and denied in part, 353 F. Supp. 2d 1095 (S.D. Cal., 2005)

Holding
- Vessel that merely purchased shark fins from others on high seas was not acting in support of fishing and did not therefore meet the statutory definition of a fishing vessel, so fins could not lawfully be seized when intent was to land them at foreign port; government's failure to provide timely notice that Shark Finning Prohibition Act of 2000 was to be interpreted thusly violated due process. Southern District of California reversed and remanded.

Court membership
- Judges sitting: Stephen Reinhardt, Raymond C. Fisher, Richard R. Clifton

Case opinions
- Majority: Reinhardt, joined by Fisher, Clifton

Laws applied
- Magnuson–Stevens Fishery Conservation and Management Act, Shark Finning Prohibition Act of 2000
- Superseded by
- Shark Conservation Act

United States v. Approximately 64,695 Pounds of Shark Fins (520 F.3d 976) is a 2008 decision of the United States Court of Appeals for the Ninth Circuit concerning civil forfeiture in admiralty law. Judge Stephen Reinhardt wrote for a three-judge panel that ordered that the shark fins be returned to their owners, reversing a decision by the Southern District of California. The government did not appeal the case further.

The case began in 2002 when a Coast Guard crew working from a Navy ship stopped and searched the King Diamond II, a U.S.-flagged, Hong Kong–based vessel in international waters off the coast of Guatemala. On board the ship they found shark fins, equivalent to 32.3 tons (29.3 tonnes) but without any corresponding shark carcasses. The Coast Guard, upon further investigation, found documentary evidence that the KD II had arranged to meet fishing vessels at predetermined locations and buy various quantities of fins. These activities were believed to violate the Shark Finning Prohibition Act of 2000 (SFPA). The fins were thus seized and the ship escorted to San Diego, the nearest American port.

Federal agencies filed charges against the KD II's owner, operator and captain. They further sought forfeiture of the fins under in rem jurisdiction, resulting in the unusual case title. Judge Barry Ted Moskowitz granted the order in 2005. The boat's owners appealed to the Ninth Circuit, which reversed Moskowitz's decision three years later. It held that the seizure was illegal: the KD II's activities did not meet the definition of a fishing vessel under the Magnuson–Stevens Fishery Conservation and Management Act. Since it did not, under the SFPA, the fins could not have been lawfully seized on the high seas. In 2011, President Barack Obama signed the Shark Conservation Act into law, which closed these loopholes.

== Background ==
China's late-20th-century economic reforms produced a middle class that increased demand for traditional luxury items like shark fins. Chinese traditional medicine ascribes various restorative and healing effects to the fins, and the soup is considered a delicacy, costing as much as US$100 per bowl. The Chinese demand for fins led fishing crews to both take them from sharks in their bycatch and start fishing for sharks directly.

Shark populations began declining. Since they are predators near the top of the marine food chain, an umbrella species, playing an important role in maintaining ocean ecosystems, this could have serious adverse environmental consequences for marine fisheries. Campaigns began in many nations to prohibit or greatly curtail finning in both territorial and international waters and work toward international agreements on the practice. In the U.S., President Bill Clinton signed the Shark Finning Prohibition Act (SFPA) into law in 2000 shortly before leaving office. It amended the Magnuson–Stevens Fishery Conservation and Management Act, the primary statute regulating fisheries in the U.S.'s Exclusive Economic Zone up to 200 nautical miles offshore, to prohibit finning in U.S. territorial waters by any vessels, and the possession of fins by a U.S.-flagged vessel in international waters or the landing of any fins at a U.S. port without corresponding carcasses amounting to at least 20 times the weight of the fins. The National Marine Fisheries Service (NMFS) was charged with promulgating and implementing regulations to enforce the act.

During Congressional debate on the SFPA, Eni Faleomavaega, non-voting Delegate to the House of Representatives from American Samoa, had expressed concerns about the lack of language barring vessels from engaging in transshipment of fins, such as purchasing those taken by other vessels on the high seas. To stop this, he introduced an amendment to the bill banning the possession of the fins without the carcasses by fishing vessels, as defined in the Magnuson–Stevens Act, and the landing of same by any vessel. Congress assumed that this language would be sufficient to accomplish its intended purpose.

== Underlying dispute ==
On August 13, 2002, the U.S. Navy destroyer USS Fife was in international waters southeast of Acapulco, Mexico, when it observed the King Diamond II, an 84-foot (26 m) U.S.-flagged vessel owned by Tran and Yu, Inc, a shipping company in Hong Kong, its home port. The Fife's crew asked more questions over the radio. It learned that the KD II, having sailed out of Honolulu some time ago, was on its way to Guatemala.

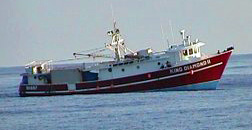
The King Diamond II as seen from the Fife

A Coast Guard detachment aboard the Fife confirmed that it was properly flying the U.S. flag. The Coast Guard was suspicious since the ship was low in the water, suggesting it was carrying heavy cargo, yet there were no cranes or other equipment that a legitimate fishing vessel would be expected to have. Instead there were several large shipping containers. Via radio, they asked the Joint Interagency Task Force West, a consortium of various federal law enforcement agencies, for permission to investigate further, since smugglers and drug traffickers were known to use that route.

After receiving permission to do so, the Coast Guard boarded the KD II. The stench of decaying flesh quickly led them to a large quantity of shark fins. They were in bundles on the deck, the shipping container and filling most of the 40-ton (36-tonne) hold, where the ammonia odor was so strong that the Coast Guardsman who found them had to breathe through his mouth since it burned his nose. Since no corresponding carcasses could be found, the task force told the boarding party that this indicated a likely violation of the SFPA, and to consider the ship a crime scene as the fins were contraband.

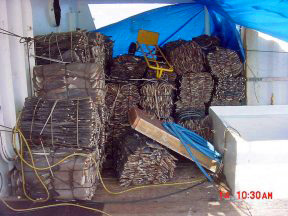
Bales of confiscated shark fins

Two days later, the Coast Guard cutter Chase took over, escorting the KD II to San Diego. Along the way the investigation continued. The Coast Guard reported that the four-man crew was cooperative with the investigation, largely sitting back and watching television in the lounge. Since they claimed not to have finned the sharks themselves, they believed they had not done anything wrong. Ship's records revealed that the KD II had met fishing vessels, primarily Korean longline fishing boats, at prearranged locations on the high seas near Fiji and the Solomon Islands and bought fins from them for a total of $250,000. On an earlier voyage that summer, the ship had made $6 million from shark fins obtained the same way. Korean-language records from a broker on board indicated an ongoing operation, giving the names of other ships involved. The refrigeration unit on board had broken before the ship had left Honolulu, and the fins were out on deck in an attempt to dry them out and reduce the odor.

In San Diego, the fins were unloaded and weighed. It took a crew of eight seven hours to unload all the fins, most of which had been tied into 2-by-3-foot (60 by 90 cm) bundles weighing roughly 100 pounds (40 kg) each. They were put on trucks to be secured in a cold-storage facility as evidence pending the outcome of any legal proceedings. At 32.3 tons (29.3 tonnes), the total was more than twice the anticipated amount, making it the largest seizure of shark fins ever. It was estimated that the fins represented a total of 30,000 sharks taken.

== Litigation ==
In early 2003 the National Oceanic and Atmospheric Administration (NOAA) Fisheries Office of Law Enforcement finished its investigation and charged Tran and Yu; Tai Loong Hong Marine Products Ltd., of Hong Kong, for whom the fins had been bought; and Chien Tan Nguyen, captain of the KD II, with 26 counts of violating the SFPA. They were assessed fines of $620,000, the highest civil penalty ever levied for a violation of the act.

Tai Loong believed that the government had exceeded its statutory authority by confiscating the fins. It argued that before Judge Barry Ted Moskowitz, a federal district judge for the Southern District of California, who granted an injunction against NOAA prohibiting it from selling the fins itself. The company and the agency then agreed that, in return for the former putting up a $775,000 bond, that it would take possession of the shark fins, although they remained in cold storage pending the outcome of the case. Tai Loong presold the fins for an amount almost equal to the fine against it. NOAA then initiated a civil forfeiture action with the bond substituting for the fins.

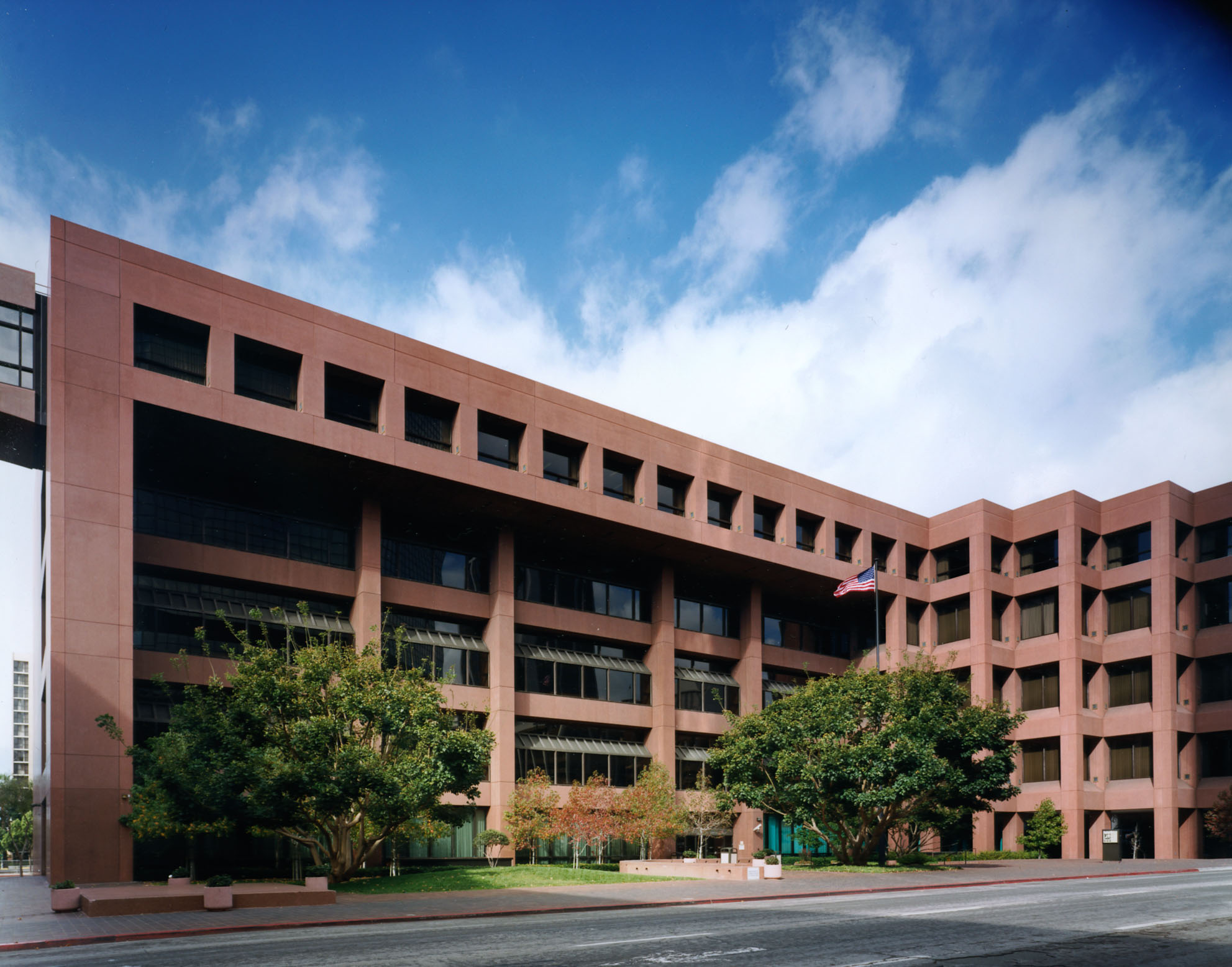
The Edward J. Schwartz Federal Courthouse in San Diego, where the case was first heard

=== District court ===
In 2004 the government went before Moskowitz seeking summary judgement. The case turned on whether the KD II was a fishing vessel under the SFPA. Early in 2005 he issued his ruling, holding that while it was not directly engaged in fishing it was nevertheless engaging in activities supporting fishing and thus also subject to the SFPA. He did not grant the forfeiture as NOAA had not moved for it yet.

The SFPA deferred to the Magnuson–Stevens Act for its definition of a fishing vessel. According to that statute, a fishing vessel was one that either engaged in fishing, or "aiding or assisting one or more vessels at sea in the performance of any activity relating to fishing, including, but not limited to, preparation, supply, storage, refrigeration, transportation, or processing." Moskowitz rejected NOAA's argument that the KD II was engaged in fishing and therefore a fishing vessel because, under its previous ownership, it had been equipped with longline equipment and held a federal permit. That had lapsed shortly after Tran and Yu bought the ship and was no longer valid, so neither was the argument based on paper. "Whether the KD II is in fact a fishing vessel under [the first definition] depends on its configuration and how it was outfitted at the time of the seizure", he wrote. Since there was nothing in the record about that, he declined to decide the question on that grounds.

There was more to consider when Moskowitz turned to the support aspect. "Simply put, the issue in this case narrows down to whether the KD II is a vessel which was used for, equipped to be used for, or of a type which is normally used for aiding or assisting one or more vessels at sea in the performance of any activity relating to fishing." On this question Moskowitz agreed with NOAA. By going from ship to ship to buy, store and transport the fins, the KD II and its crew "directly aided and assisted the foreign vessels in an expressly enumerated fishing activity under the statute."

Moskowitz qualified his interpretation by disagreeing with the government's assertion that the mere purchase of the fins constituted an activity in support of fishing, pointing out that that would make into a fishing vessel any ship where someone aboard purchased a single fin for personal use. But in this case the KD II and its crew had acted as a middleman, "effectively br[inging] the shark fin market to the foreign fishing vessels at sea. This act, in and of itself, aided and assisted the foreign fishing vessels which no longer had to store, transport, and land their shark fins in order to sell them in the market." By doing so, they had saved time and money for the other fishing vessels they had taken fins from. He cited a document in the records, a communication between Tran and the Korean broker explicitly saying that a rendezvous "will save our time and cost" as proof.

"Commonsense suggests that buying fish from fishermen at sea for resale is an activity related to fishing under the SFPA", wrote Moskowitz. "Selling the fish at sea saves the storage, transportation and landing expenses necessary to bring the fish to market, thereby increasing the profitability of the voyage. By going from ship to ship purchasing a total of 64,695 pounds of shark fins for resale in the wholesale market, the KD II aided and assisted an activity related to fishing within the plain meaning of the statute and became a 'fishing vessel.'"

Moskowitz found reinforcement in the NMFS regulations implementing the SFPA. "The prohibition of landing shark fins without corresponding carcasses extends to any vessel (including a cargo or shipping vessel) that obtained those fins from another vessel at sea", their preamble read. "Any such at-sea transfer of shark fins effectively would make the receiving vessel a 'fishing vessel,' as the receiving vessel is acting 'in support of fishing.'" Tai Loong had claimed that language applied only to vessels landing shark fins, and not just those possessing them as the KD II had at the time of its interdiction, but Moskowitz responded that the use of "any" indicated a broader reach.

The bill's legislative history showed that Congress had intended that broad reach. Senator Ernest Hollings had, in opposing the bill, worried that it might bar American ships from the shark fin trade entirely. The Congressional Budget Office had found that the bill enacted a mandate to that effect in its report to the House of Representatives. "Thus, the legislative history confirms that the SFPA applies to the KD II and its possession of 64,695 pounds of shark fins", wrote Moskowitz.

Lastly, Tai Loong had argued, even if the KD II was a fishing vessel under the statute, the interplay between two sections of the SFPA and its implementing regulations rendered them unconstitutionally vague, making it impossible for it to easily determine whether the statute applied to the KD II. It argued that this failure of the government to thus provide adequate notice that the law would be enforced against such vessels was a violation of their right to due process.

Moskowitz found the Supreme Court's decision in Hoffman Estates v. The Flipside relevant to his analysis. There, the Court had reversed the Seventh Circuit and upheld a local ordinance imposing restrictions on the sale of drug paraphernalia. Like the SFPA, Moskowitz observed, that ordinance, too, had been enforced only with civil penalties, and was primarily an economic regulation aimed at business activity, which businesses can reasonably be expected to study and prepare for. "Accordingly, the SFPA provisions do not merit strict scrutiny for vagueness."

Under a lesser standard, Moskowitz strongly rejected the vagueness argument. "[T]he fishing vessel definition here is patently broad on its face", he wrote. "So broad, in fact, that an ordinary person of reasonable intelligence would think that the KD II's activities would probably be included in the blanket fishing vessel definition rather than exempt from it ... Commonsense indicates that picking up fish or its parts at sea aids fishing and thereby renders the vessel within the express definition of a 'fishing vessel' under [Magnuson–Stevens]." He found further that the publication of the SFPA regulations by the NMFS in the Federal Register constituted constructive notice to Tai Loong. "A reasonable person in the shark fin business would be aware of the SFPA's application to the KD II's activities."

=== Appeals court ===
Tai Loong appealed, working out stipulations with NOAA to expedite that process. Foremost among them was an agreement on the market value of the fins, $618,956, to be forfeited if the appeals court ruled in the government's favor. The district court granted the forfeiture in the middle of 2005, and the case went to the Ninth Circuit Court of Appeals.

Judges Stephen Reinhardt, Raymond C. Fisher and Richard R. Clifton (nominated to the court by presidents Jimmy Carter, Bill Clinton, and George W. Bush respectively) were empaneled to hear the case. After oral arguments in May 2007, they announced their decision ten months later, in March 2008. Unanimously, they reversed Moskowitz and ruled that the KD II was not a fishing vessel, therefore the fins had not been lawfully seized.

"In this case," wrote Reinhardt, "we find nothing in the plain meaning of [the statute] that would provide notice to the owners of the KD II that its activities would render it a fishing vessel." He read the text of the statute closely to show where Moskowitz had erred. Indeed, the ship had "refrigerate[d], store[d] and transport[ed]" the fins, but the governing words were "aid and assist". Reinhardt cited dictionary definitions of both words as "generally connot[ing] doing an act for the benefit of another." He explained at length why the purchase of an item does not constitute aid or assistance to the seller:

In this case, the charterers of the KD II did not purchase, store or transport shark fins for the benefit of the foreign fishing vessels. Instead, they purchased the fins for their own commercial purposes. The foreign fishing vessels had no interest in the shark fins after selling them to the KD II. As a result, the KD II's subsequent post-purchase storage and transport of the shark fins did not benefit the foreign vessels any more than the purchaser of any other product aids and assists the seller by storing the goods it has acquired in a warehouse or transporting them to the location at which it intends to resell them. Nor does the mere act of purchasing constitute an act of aiding and assisting a seller. Otherwise it would not be necessary in criminal statutes that are intended to punish buyers as well as sellers of illegal substances to specify the former group expressly. It would be enough that selling is proscribed and that a purchaser bought the illicit product. Under the district court's theory, the simple act of purchasing would make a buyer an aider or abettor. This is simply incorrect.

He noted that "purchase" was not specifically included as a support activity in the statute.

For the same reasons, Reinhardt rejected Moskowitz's finding that, specifically, the purchase of the fins at predetermined locations on the high seas aided the fishing vessels the KD II purchased the fins from, since it was at all times acting on its own interests. "[It] may have been beneficial or even necessary to those vessels' business operations, but the choice did not change the nature of the purchasers' actions in any respect," he observed. "They still purchased the fins, stored them and transported them for their own commercial purposes. From the standpoint of the purchaser, any benefit to the seller was incidental."

Even the letter to the broker specifically stating that the at-sea purchases would save "time and expense" was not convincing.

[I]t does not establish that the failure or inability to make such arrangements with respect to all the foreign vessels constituted aiding or assisting those to which the KD II actually went. Surely, purchasing all the shark fins at the dock would have been preferable for [Tai Loong] (if the cost were to remain the same), and surely the sellers benefited from selling at a particular location, just as they benefited from making the sale in the first place. Nevertheless, wherever the purchase is made, the purchaser is doing no more than making a purchase that it desires to make for its own business reasons. As a result, while the district court's assumption that the seller would benefit from the location of particular sales appears reasonable, it is irrelevant.

While the court recognized Congress's intent to curtail and eventually eliminate shark finning by passing the SFPA, "the broad purpose of the Act provides no help to the government with regard to the issue on appeal," Reinhardt wrote. He turned finally to the regulations, where he pointed out that Moskowitz had applied the language from the preamble too broadly. "[I]n context, [it] suggests the opposite." Instead of being a case of a vessel with shark fins bound for an American port, the case was instead covered by the regulations on possession, since the KD II was bound for a foreign port, and those provisions were specific to fishing vessels. "Where an agency includes language in one section of the regulation and omits it in another, it is reasonable to presume that the agency acted intentionally in forgoing the language," he wrote, paraphrasing parallel Supreme Court precedent regarding Congressional intent."

"Taken together," Reinhardt concluded, "the regulations and the preamble may be reasonably read to provide notice that vessels that engage in at-sea transfers of fins, are prohibited from landing shark fins in a U.S. port, but they do not provide notice that such vessels are prohibited from possessing fins for the purpose of making a delivery to a foreign port." He also noted that the preamble had language stating it was not the NMFS's intent to interfere with international trade. "Under the circumstances, a reasonable person would not have fair notice that the activities of the KD II would render it a fishing vessel under [the statute]. As a result, we hold that the district court's application of the possession prohibition of the SFPA to the KD II as a fishing vessel ... violated due process."

== Shark Conservation Act ==
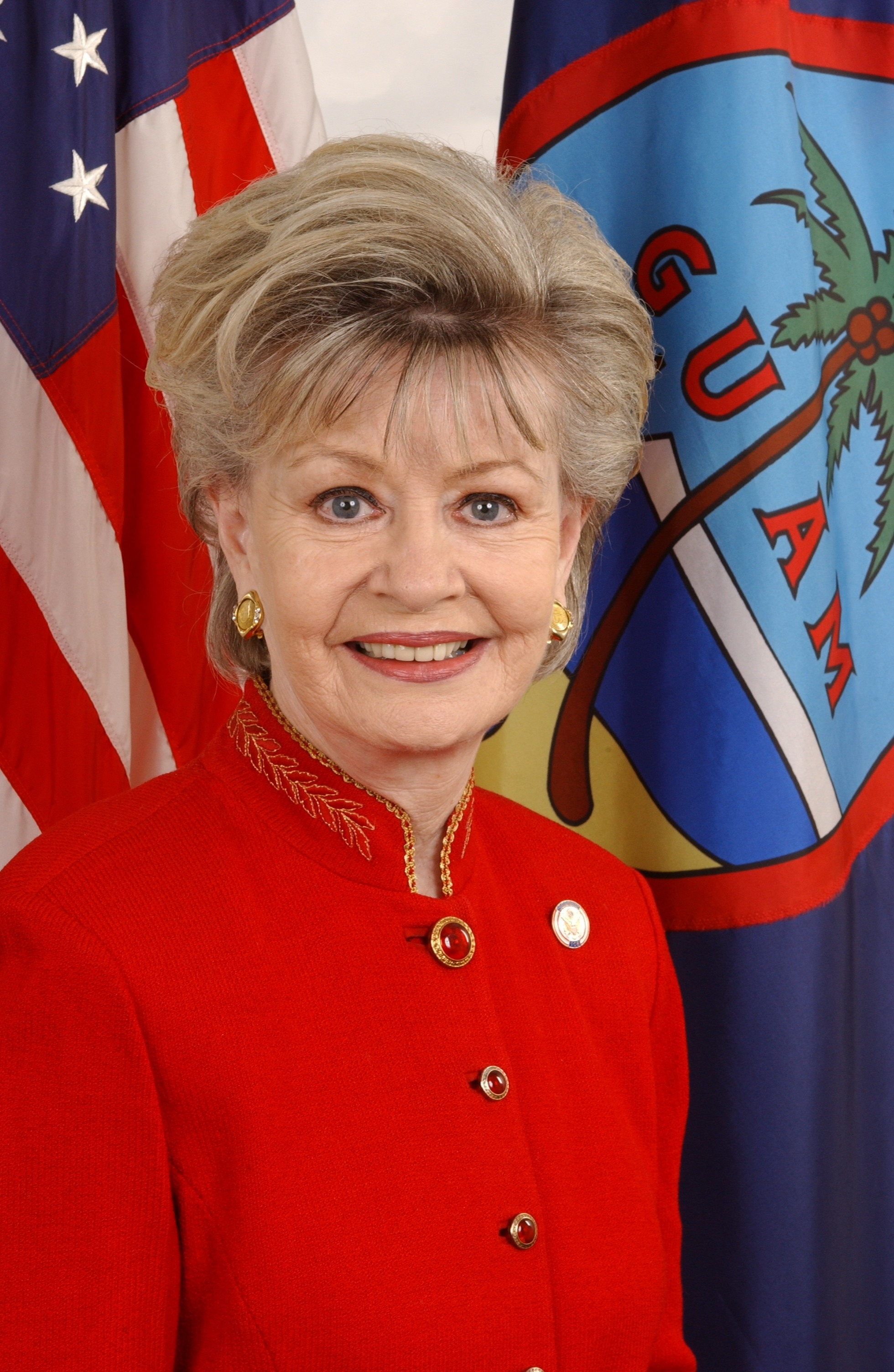
Del. Madeleine Bordallo of Guam, who introduced the Shark Conservation Act to close the loophole the decision created

Within a month of the decision, Madeleine Bordallo, Delegate from Guam, introduced the Shark Conservation Act in the U.S. House to close the loophole highlighted by the decision. It eliminated the fins-to-carcass ratio entirely and replaced it with language forbidding any U.S.-flagged vessel, not just a fishing vessel, from carrying shark fins not naturally attached to the corresponding carcass, mirroring a law already adopted by Hawaii. In his later report on the bill, Rep. Nick Rahall, the committee chair, said that Congress had believed in 2000 the language of Magnuson–Stevens was sufficient to prevent transshipment. The new legislation's primary purpose, he stated explicitly, was to close the loophole the decision opened.

The bill was referred to the Natural Resources Committee, which then referred it to its Subcommittee on Fisheries, Wildlife and Oceans, chaired by Bordallo. Hearings were held a week later, at which Shelley Clarke, a researcher at Imperial College London who studies the shark-fin trade, observed that transshipment operations such as the KD II's were common and would likely continue as the competition in Hong Kong, the industry's traditional center, grew more intense. While the transshipment ban was an effective response to the decision, she suggested that shipments of containerized fins be allowed if they had been separated from their carcasses after landing.

In the report, Rahall did not directly criticize the court, but Don Young of Alaska, the committee's ranking member, did. In a section for additional views at the end of the report, he called the Ninth Circuit's decision "mistaken." The KD II's action "was clearly a violation of the Act, but the court ruled otherwise," he wrote. "The court was clearly wrong in their decision and I am glad that we are overriding the court decision in this case."

In June the subcommittee met to mark up the bill. Bordallo's amendment tightening the language prohibiting vessel transport of fins was passed by voice vote. A week later the full committee, after adding an amendment by Faleomavaega requiring that fins be attached to the carcasses, sent the bill to the full House. In July it was passed by voice vote and referred to the Senate, where it was sponsored by John Kerry of Massachusetts. It was read twice and referred to the Committee on Commerce, Science and Transportation. No further action was taken before the 110th Congress adjourned, and the bill died.

Bordallo reintroduced it, as amended, at the beginning of the next Congress. It gained 30 cosponsors, bypassed the committee stage and was passed by voice vote in March 2009. Kerry reintroduced it in the Senate a month later; it eventually gained 33 cosponsors there. The Senate Subcommittee on Oceans, Atmosphere, Fisheries and Coast Guard held hearings on the bill in June.

The Senate report, by Jay Rockefeller of West Virginia, reiterated that "The bill would clarify in statute what was already popularly understood to be the scope of application of the SFPA" prior to the case, but did not otherwise make any commentary regarding it. A group of shark attack survivors visited senators' offices to lobby for the bill in July. It was passed near the end of the year and signed into law by President Barack Obama on January 4, 2011.

== See also ==
- List of environmental lawsuits
