= Shark Finning Prohibition Act =

United States wildlife law in 2000

- Long title: An Act to amend the Magnuson-Stevens Fishery Conservation and Management Act to eliminate the wasteful and unsportsmanlike practice of shark finning.
- Acronyms (colloquial): SFPA
- Enacted by: the 106th United States Congress

Citations
- Public law: Pub. L. 106–557 (text) (PDF)
- Statutes at Large: 114 Stat. 2772

Codification
- Acts amended: Magnuson–Stevens Fishery Conservation and Management Act
- Titles amended: 16 U.S.C.
- U.S.C. sections amended: 1857

Legislative history
- Introduced in the House of Representatives as H.R. 5461 by Duke Cunningham (R–CA) on October 12, 2000; Committee consideration by House Committee on Natural Resources, Subcommittee on Fisheries, Wildlife, Oceans and Insular Affairs; Passed the House on October 30, 2000 (voice vote ); Passed the Senate on December 7, 2000 (Unanimous Consent ); Signed into law by President Bill Clinton on December 21, 2000

Major amendments
- Shark Conservation Act of 2009

The Shark Finning Prohibition Act was signed into law by Bill Clinton on December 21, 2000. It had forbidden finning by any vessels in the U.S. Exclusive Economic Zone (up to 200 nautical miles (370 km; 230 mi) offshore), and possession of fins by any U.S.-flagged fishing vessels on international waters. It also prohibited any fishing vessel from landing at a U.S. port with shark fins whose weight exceeds 5% of the total weight of shark carcasses landed or on board. These provisions left loopholes that would successfully be exploited in its first court test.

== Legislative history ==
H.R. 5461 was introduced on October 12, 2000, by Rep. Randy (Duke) Cunningham (R-CA) with no co-sponsors. It was referred to the House Committee on Natural Resources, which then referred it Subcommittee on Fisheries, Wildlife, Oceans and Insular Affairs on October 20, 2000. Ten days later, it was brought up on motion to suspend the rules and pass the bill, and was agreed to by voice vote. On October 31, 2000, H.R. 5461 was received in the Senate, which passed the bill by unanimous consent on December 7, 2000. It was signed into law by Bill Clinton on December 21, 2000, during his final weeks in office.

== Background ==
Shark finning refers to the practice of cutting the fins from live sharks while at sea, and then discarding rest of the fish back into the ocean. If they are still alive, the sharks either die from suffocation or are eaten because they are unable to move normally. Shark finning is widespread, and largely unregulated and unmonitored. The practice has been on the rise largely due to the increasing demand for shark fins for shark fin soup and traditional cures, particularly in China and its territories. According to WildAid in 2007, "the rapidly expanding and largely unregulated shark fin trade represents one of the most serious threats to shark populations worldwide, and shark fins are now among the most expensive seafood products in the world, commonly retailing at US$400 per kg, with the most expensive selling for US$1,000 per kg." According to Discovery News, "[u]p to 73 million sharks are killed annually for their lucrative fins."

During the congressional discussion, Shark finning was called "one of the most visible and controversial conservation issues in the waters of the Pacific Ocean". While the practice of finning had already been banned in Federal waters of the Atlantic, Gulf of Mexico, and the Caribbean, as well as waters in 11 coastal States, it remained unregulated in the Pacific. This legislation was designed to address that problem.

According to the bill's proponent, the bill was "strongly supported by the Ocean Wildlife Campaign, a coalition that includes the Center for Marine Conservation, National Audubon Society, National Coalition for Marine Conservation, Natural Resources Defense Council, Wildlife Conservation Society, and the World Wildlife Fund. In addition, it is supported by the State of Hawaii Office of Hawaiian Affairs, the American Sportfishing Association, the Recreational Fishing Alliance, the Sportfishing Association of California, the Cousteau Society, and the Western Pacific Fisheries Coalition."

== Provisions ==
The Act made it illegal to:

1. remove any of the fins of a shark (including the tail) and discard the carcass of the shark at sea;
2. have custody, control, or possession of any such fin aboard a fishing vessel without the corresponding carcass; or
3. land any such fin without the corresponding carcass.

By way of definition, the Act created a "rebuttable presumption that any shark fins landed from a fishing vessel or found on board a fishing vessel were taken, held, or landed in violation ... if the total weight of shark fins landed or found on board exceeds 5 percent of the total weight of shark carcasses landed or found on board."

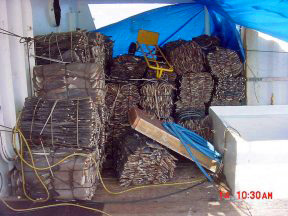
Shark fins confiscated from the King Diamond II

== Court test ==
During debate on the bill, Del. Eni Faleomavaega (D-AS), had pointed out that nothing in it banned the transshipment of shark fins by American-flagged ships. Vessels that merely bought fins that had been taken by other vessels, a common practice, could not be prosecuted. His concern was resolved with an amendment that relied on the definition of "fishing vessel" in the Magnuson–Stevens Fishery Conservation and Management Act. This included not only those engaged in fishing but vessels that "aided and assisted" such fishing, including the refrigeration, storage and transport of fish. Congress believed that language was sufficient.

Two years later, that belief would be tested in court. In August 2002, the destroyer USS Fife, patrolling international waters off the coast of Guatemala, intercepted the King Diamond II, a U.S.-flagged, Hong Kong-based former fishing trawler. A Coast Guard detachment with the Fife was sent aboard to investigate, and found 32.3 short tons (29.3 t) of shark fins rotting in various locations on board, without any corresponding carcasses.

The KD II was escorted to San Diego, where the National Oceanic and Atmospheric Administration Fisheries Office of Law Enforcement finished the investigation. The ship's owner, captain and charterer were fined over $600,000 for the largest shark fin arrest ever. But in 2008, the Ninth Circuit Court of Appeals ordered the fins returned. Judge Stephen Reinhardt held for a three-judge panel that a vessel carrying shark fins that it had purchased from other vessels on the high seas did not come under the act since purchasing the fins did not constitute aid or assistance to those who had taken them; thus the fins had not been seized lawfully.

To close the loophole, Congress passed the Shark Conservation Act of 2010, which was signed into law by President Barack Obama on January 4, 2011.

== Legislative summary ==
Congress	Short title	Bill number(s)	Date introduced	Sponsor(s)	# of cosponsors	Latest status
106th Congress	Shark Finning Prohibition Act	H.R. 5461	October 12, 2000	Rep. Randy (Duke) Cunningham (R-CA)	0	Became Public Law No: 106-557.
