= Shark Conservation Act =

United States wildlife law in 2009

Shark Conservation Act of 2009
- Other short titles: International Fisheries Agreement Clarification Act; Shark Conservation Act of 2010
- Long title: A bill to amend the High Seas Driftnet Fishing Moratorium Protection Act and the Magnuson-Stevens Fishery Conservation and Management Act to improve the conservation of sharks.

Citations
- Public law: Pub.L. 111–348
- Statutes at Large: 124 Stat. 3668

Codification
- Acts amended: Magnuson–Stevens Fishery Conservation and Management Act
- Titles amended: Title 16—Conservation
- U.S.C. sections amended: 16 U.S.C. § 1826i 16 U.S.C. § 1826j 16 U.S.C. § 1826k 16 U.S.C. § 1857

Legislative history
- Introduced in the House as H.R. 81 by Madeleine Bordallo (D–GU) on January 6, 2009; Committee consideration by Senate Committee on Commerce, Science, and Transportation and House Natural Resources; Passed the House on March 2, 2009 (voice vote); Passed the Senate on December 20, 2010 (unanimous consent) with amendment; House agreed to Senate amendment on December 21, 2010 (voice vote); Signed into law by President Barack Obama on January 4, 2011

The Shark Conservation Act of 2009 (SCA) (H.R. 81, S. 850) was passed by the 111th United States Congress that amended the High Seas Driftnet Fishing Moratorium Protection Act and the Magnuson–Stevens Fishery Conservation and Management Act to improve the conservation of sharks. The bill was approved by the House of Representatives on March 2, 2009 by voice vote. It was taken up by the Senate and amended to incorporate further changes to Magnuson-Stevens, known as the International Fisheries Agreement Clarification Act. The Senate passed the amended bill as the Shark Conservation Act of 2010 on December 20, 2010 by unanimous consent, and the next day the House accepted the amendment, again by voice vote. The bill was signed into law by President Barack Obama on January 4, 2011.

A decade earlier, the Shark Finning Prohibition Act (SFPA) had been passed to combat the increased practice of removing fins from sharks, usually taken in bycatch by longline fishing vessels, to satisfy increased demand for shark fin soup, a delicacy in China. In 2008, a federal appeals court ruled in United States v. Approximately 64,695 Pounds of Shark Fins that transshipment of fins taken by other vessels was not prohibited by the SFPA. Within weeks of that decision, the SCA was introduced to close that loophole. It prohibits any person from cutting the fins of a shark at sea and from possessing, transferring and landing shark fins (including the tail) that are not "naturally attached to the corresponding carcass". In addition it prohibits any person from landing a shark carcass without its corresponding fins being "naturally attached".

The act protects all shark species, with an exception for commercial fishing of smooth dogfish (Mustelus canis) with a valid State license within 50 nautical miles (93 km; 58 mi) of any given State's coast.

== Background ==
Shark finning refers to the practice of cutting the fins from live sharks while at sea, and then discarding the rest of the fish back into the ocean. If they are still alive, the sharks either die from suffocation or are eaten because they are unable to move normally. Shark finning is widespread, and largely unregulated and unmonitored. The practice has been on the rise largely due to the increasing demand for shark fins for shark fin soup and traditional cures, particularly in China and its territories. Studies estimate that 26 to 73 million sharks are harvested annually for their fins. The estimated median of 38 million is nearly four times the number recorded by the Food and Agriculture Organization (FAO) of the United Nations, but considerably lower than the estimates of many conservationists. Shark fins are among the most expensive seafood products in the world, and can fetch up to $300 per pound mostly in Asian markets as a soup ingredient." In 2009, the International Union for Conservation of Nature (IUCN) red list of oceanic sharks named 64 species, a third of all oceanic shark species, at risk of extinction due to fishing and shark finning.

In 2000, Congress had passed its first legislation addressing shark finning, the Shark Finning Prohibition Act (SFPA), signed into law by Bill Clinton. It outlawed any finning by any vessels in the U.S. Exclusive Economic Zone (up to 200 nautical miles (370 km; 230 mi) offshore), and possession of fins by any U.S.-flagged fishing vessels on international waters. It also prohibited any fishing vessel from landing at a U.S. port with shark fins whose weight exceeded 5% of the total weight of shark carcasses landed or on board. These provisions left loopholes that would successfully be exploited in its first court test, United States v. Approximately 64,695 Pounds of Shark Fins.

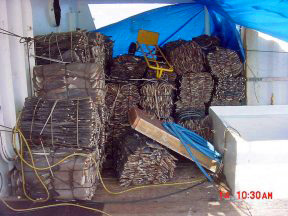
Shark fins confiscated from the King Diamond II

In August 2002, the destroyer USS Fife, patrolling international waters off the coast of Guatemala, intercepted the King Diamond II, a U.S.-flagged, Hong Kong-based former fishing trawler. A Coast Guard detachment with the Fife was sent aboard to investigate, and found 32.3 short tons (29.3 t) of shark fins rotting in various locations on board, without any carcasses on board.

The King Diamond II was escorted to San Diego, where the National Oceanic and Atmospheric Administration Fisheries Office of Law Enforcement finished the investigation. The ship's owner, captain and charterer were fined over $600,000 for the largest shark fin arrest ever. But in 2008, the Ninth Circuit Court of Appeals ordered the fins returned. Judge Stephen Reinhardt held for a three-judge panel that a vessel carrying shark fins that it had purchased from other vessels on the high seas did not meet the definition of a fishing vessel. Accordingly, it did not fall within the purview of the SFPA, and therefore the fins had been seized unlawfully.

== Draft provisions ==
In its draft form, the bill eliminated entirely the fins-to-carcass ratio that was established by the Shark Finning Prohibition Act (SFPA), and replaced it with language forbidding any U.S.-flagged vessel (not just fishing vessels) from carrying "any [shark] fin that is not naturally attached to the corresponding carcass", mirroring a law already adopted by Hawaii. In addition, it required that the Secretary of Commerce include in a bienniel report on the enforcement of the law the names of nations which had not made significant efforts to stop shark finning.

== Legislative history ==
The original bill, the Shark Conservation Act of 2008 (H.R. 5741), was introduced in May 2008 by Del. Madeleine Bordallo (D-GU). It was referred to the Natural Resources Committee, and then to its Subcommittee on Fisheries, Wildlife and Oceans, chaired by Bordallo. Hearings were held a week later.

In his report on the bill, Natural Resources Committee Chair Nick Rahall explicitly stated that its primary purpose was to close a loophole in the SFPA that had been successfully exploited in its first test case. When that bill was passed in 2000, he noted, Delegate Eni Faleomavaega (D-AS) had raised the question of exactly the sort of transshipment the KD II had been engaged in. Faleomavaega had introduced an amendment to that bill banning the possession of the fins without the carcasses by fishing vessels, and the landing of same by any vessel. "With this amendment," Rahall wrote, "the Committee assumed that finning, as well as transshipment, would be successfully prohibited". Specifically, the SFPA was an amendment to the Magnuson–Stevens Act, which defined fishing vessels to include those "aiding or assisting ... in the performance of any activity relating to fishing, including, but not limited to, ... transportation." The SFPA had failed, however, to adequately cover a scenario involving the sale and transfer of fins while on the high seas.

In June, the subcommittee met to mark up the bill. Bordallo's amendment tightening the language prohibiting vessel transport of fins was passed by voice vote. A week later the full committee, after adding an amendment by Faleomavaega requiring that fins be attached to the carcasses, sent the bill to the full House. In July, it was passed by voice vote and referred to the Senate, where it was sponsored by John Kerry of Massachusetts. It was read twice and referred to the Committee on Commerce, Science and Transportation. No further action was taken before the 110th Congress adjourned, and the bill died.

Bordallo reintroduced it, as amended, as the Shark Conservation Act of 2009 at the beginning of the next Congress. It gained 30 cosponsors, bypassed the committee stage and was passed by voice vote in March 2009. Kerry reintroduced it in the Senate a month later; it eventually gained 33 cosponsors there. The Senate Subcommittee on Oceans, Atmosphere, Fisheries and Coast Guard held hearings on the bill in June.

The Senate report, by Jay Rockefeller of West Virginia, reiterated that "The bill would clarify in statute what was already popularly understood to be the scope of application of the SFPA" prior to the case, but did not otherwise make any commentary regarding it. A group of shark attack survivors visited senators' offices to lobby for the bill in July.

It remained in committee for over a year. In late September, it was placed on the Senate's unanimous consent agenda, under which it would be considered passed if no senator objected within a certain time. Tom Coburn of Oklahoma objected, claiming that it and four other wildlife-related bills were "special interest" legislation that would cost too much money.

In late December, near the end of the session, it was finally discharged from the committee by unanimous consent, and passed with an amendment the same way. The next day the House accepted the Senate amendment and passed the revised bill by voice vote. President Barack Obama signed it into law in January 2011.

== Final provisions ==
With respect to the Magnuson–Stevens Act, this Act in its final form replaced the SFPA entirely, and made it illegal:

1. to remove any of the fins of a shark (including the tail) at sea;
2. to have custody, control, or possession of any such fin aboard a fishing vessel unless it is naturally attached to the corresponding carcass;
3. to transfer any such fin from one vessel to another vessel at sea, or to receive any such fin in such transfer, without the fin naturally attached to the corresponding carcass; or
4. to land any such fin that is not naturally attached to the corresponding carcass, or to land any shark carcass without such fins naturally attached.

It further defined the term ‘naturally attached’ to mean "attached to the corresponding shark carcass through some portion of uncut skin". For non-fishing vessels found carrying detached fins, they are presumed to have been transferred in violation of the Act, unless they can prove otherwise (e.g. that the sharks were properly landed and processed before being re-shipped). Finally, a violation is also presumed if, after landing & processing, the weight of fins and tails exceeds 5% of the total weight of carcasses that were landed.

The Act protects all shark species, with an exception for commercial fishing of smooth dogfish (Mustelus canis) within 50 nautical miles (93 km; 58 mi) of any state, provided that:

- the vessel holds a valid commercial fishing license issued by that state, and
- the total weight of smooth dogfish fins landed or found on board a vessel must not exceed 12 percent of the total weight of smooth dogfish carcasses landed or found on board.

== Support for the act ==
The Humane Society of the United States voiced their strong support in favor of closing the loophole. They applauded Delegate Bordallo for reintroducing the legislation, noting that it had been approved by the House of Representatives in the 110th Congress, but failed to be taken up by the Senate.

On July 15, 2009, a group of shark bite victims visited 25 senators and asked the lawmakers to protect sharks and support the act and end shark finning, where a shark's fins are cut off and the body is discarded.

== Legislative summary ==
Congress	Short title	Bill number(s)	Date introduced	Sponsor(s)	# of cosponsors	Latest status
111th Congress	Shark Conservation Act of 2009	H.R. 81	January 6, 2009	Del. Madeleine Bordallo (D-GU)	30	Passed unanimously in House.
111th Congress	Shark Conservation Act of 2009	S. 850	April 22, 2009	Sen. John Kerry (D-MA)	33	Reported out of the Commerce, Science, and Transportation Committee unanimously.
