= United States House Natural Resources Subcommittee on Fisheries, Wildlife, Oceans and Insular Affairs =

United States Congress subcommittee

The United States House Natural Resources Subcommittee on Fisheries, Wildlife, Oceans and Insular Affairs was one of the five subcommittees within the House Natural Resources Committee. Its purview has been split between two successor subcommittees: the Subcommittee on Indian, Insular and Alaska Native Affairs, and the Subcommittee on Water, Power and Oceans.

At the beginning of the 114th Congress, Rep. Rob Bishop of Utah became the new Chairman of the House Natural Resources Committee. He reorganized the committee's structure, eliminated this Subcommittee, and split its duties between the Subcommittee on Indian, Insular and Alaska Native Affairs, and the Subcommittee on Water, Power and Oceans.

== Members, 113th Congress ==
Majority	Minority
John Fleming, Louisiana, Chairman; Don Young, Alaska; Rob Wittman, Virginia; Glenn Thompson, Pennsylvania; Jeff Duncan, South Carolina; Steve Southerland, Florida; Bill Flores, Texas; Jon Runyan, New Jersey; Vance McAllister, Louisiana; Bradley Byrne, Alabama	Gregorio Sablan, Northern Mariana Islands, Ranking Member; Eni F.H. Faleomavaega, American Samoa; Frank Pallone, New Jersey; Madeleine Bordallo, Guam; Pedro Pierluisi, Puerto Rico; Carol Shea-Porter, New Hampshire; Alan Lowenthal, California; Joe Garcia, Florida
Ex officio
Doc Hastings, Washington	Peter DeFazio, Oregon
