= Eight Immortals Crossing the Sea Gamboling Around the Arhat =

Confucian cuisine seafood dish

The Eight Immortals Crossing the Sea Gamboling Around the Arhat (Note: also "Eight Immortals Crossing the Sea While Teasing Buddhist Saints") (Chinese: 八仙过海闹罗汉, romanized: bā xiān guò hǎi nào luó hàn) is a gourmet dish from Confucian cuisine. An allusion to the Eight Immortals, the dish centrally features the four sea delicacies of Chinese cuisine. It was prominently served at the Kong Family Mansion since the Han dynasty.

== Etymology and description ==
The Eight Immortals Crossing the Sea Gamboling Around the Arhat is a reference to the Eight Immortals of Chinese mythology, particularly the story of "The Eight Immortals Cross the Sea." The dish features chicken (the "Arhat") surrounded by eight steamed ingredients (the "Eight Immortals"): the four sea delicacies of abalone, fish maw, sea cucumber, and shark's fin; shrimp; shark cartilage; asparagus; and Jinhua ham. The ingredients are arranged in a pot or sectioned dish, then ladled over with chicken broth and hot lard.

== History ==
The Eight Immortals Crossing the Sea Gamboling Around the Arhat was developed during the Han dynasty, c. 206 BCE - 220 CE. The dish is a centerpiece of the Confucian Feast (孔宴), a yearly banquet held at the Kong Family Mansion to celebrate the birthday of Confucius, held from the Han dynasty to the fall of the Qing dynasty in 1911. Emperors and literati would attend the banquet as a part of pilgrimage to Qufu, Shandong; the Qianlong Emperor was particularly known to have attended at least seven times. The dish was traditionally heralded at the banquet by a gong and eaten during a Chinese opera performance. Despite Confucian cuisine being suppressed during the Cultural Revolution of 1966-1976, the dish is still served today at banquets at the Kong Family Mansion.

A moe anthropomorphism or anthropomorphic ikemen of The Eight Immortals Crossing the Sea Gamboling Around the Arhat features as a recruitable character in the 2019 gacha otome game, The Tale of Food (食物语).

== See also ==
- Duke Yansheng
- Buddha Jumps Over the Wall
- Shandong cuisine
- Temple of Confucius, Qufu
