= Four sea delicacies =

Traditional Chinese seafood grouping

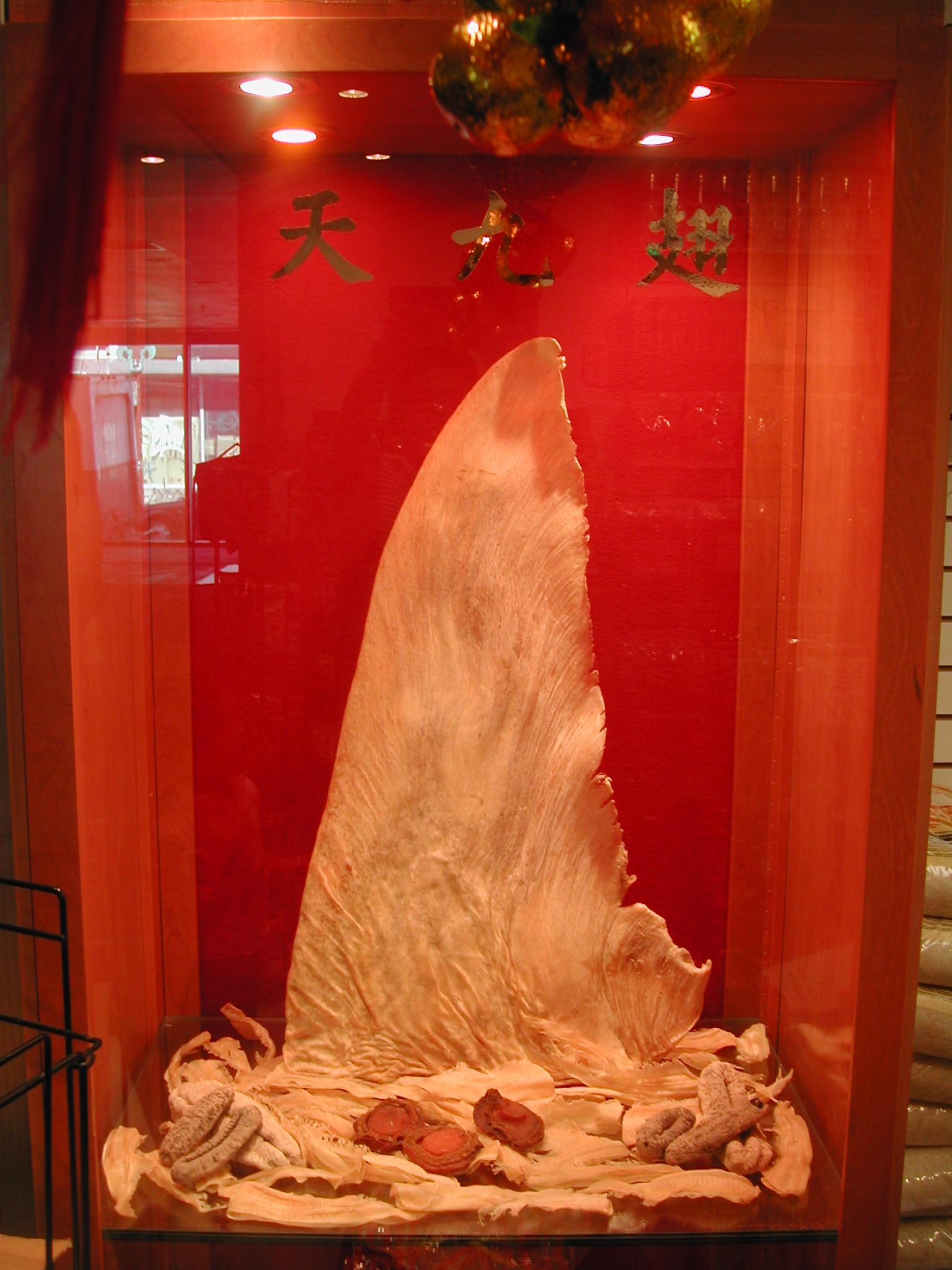
- Dried example: shark's fin, center; sea cucumber, bottom sides; abalone, bottom middle; fish maw, below
- Alternative names: simplified Chinese: 鲍参翅肚; traditional Chinese: 鮑參翅肚; pinyin: bàoshēnchìdǔ
- Type: Seafood (often dried), luxury good
- Place of origin: China
- Associated cuisine: Chinese cuisine
- Main ingredients: abalone; sea cucumber; shark's fin; fish maw

The four sea delicacies or four sea treasures (simplified Chinese: 鲍参翅肚; traditional Chinese: 鮑參翅肚; pinyin: bàoshēnchìdǔ) are the four highly prized seafoods of Chinese cuisine: abalone, sea cucumber, shark's fin, and fish maw. As luxury goods, these foods confer prestige in Chinese culture, and command high prices; demand for exotic species has driven global wildlife trade, including ecologically damaging practices like shark finning and overfishing.

== History ==
Abalone became a court food in the mid-18th century, marked by records of an all-abalone feast. The grouping coalesced as a part of the lavish Manchu–Han Imperial Feast tradition.

The four sea delicacies have become more accessible to a rising Chinese middle class since the reform and opening-up of the late 20th century, featuring heavily in modern Chinese banquet culture, such as traditional Chinese wedding banquets and on Chinese New Year.

As environmentalist opposition to shark's fin and shark finning increased in the 21st century, the other three sea delicacies have seen growing popularity, being perceived as less-controversial substitutes.

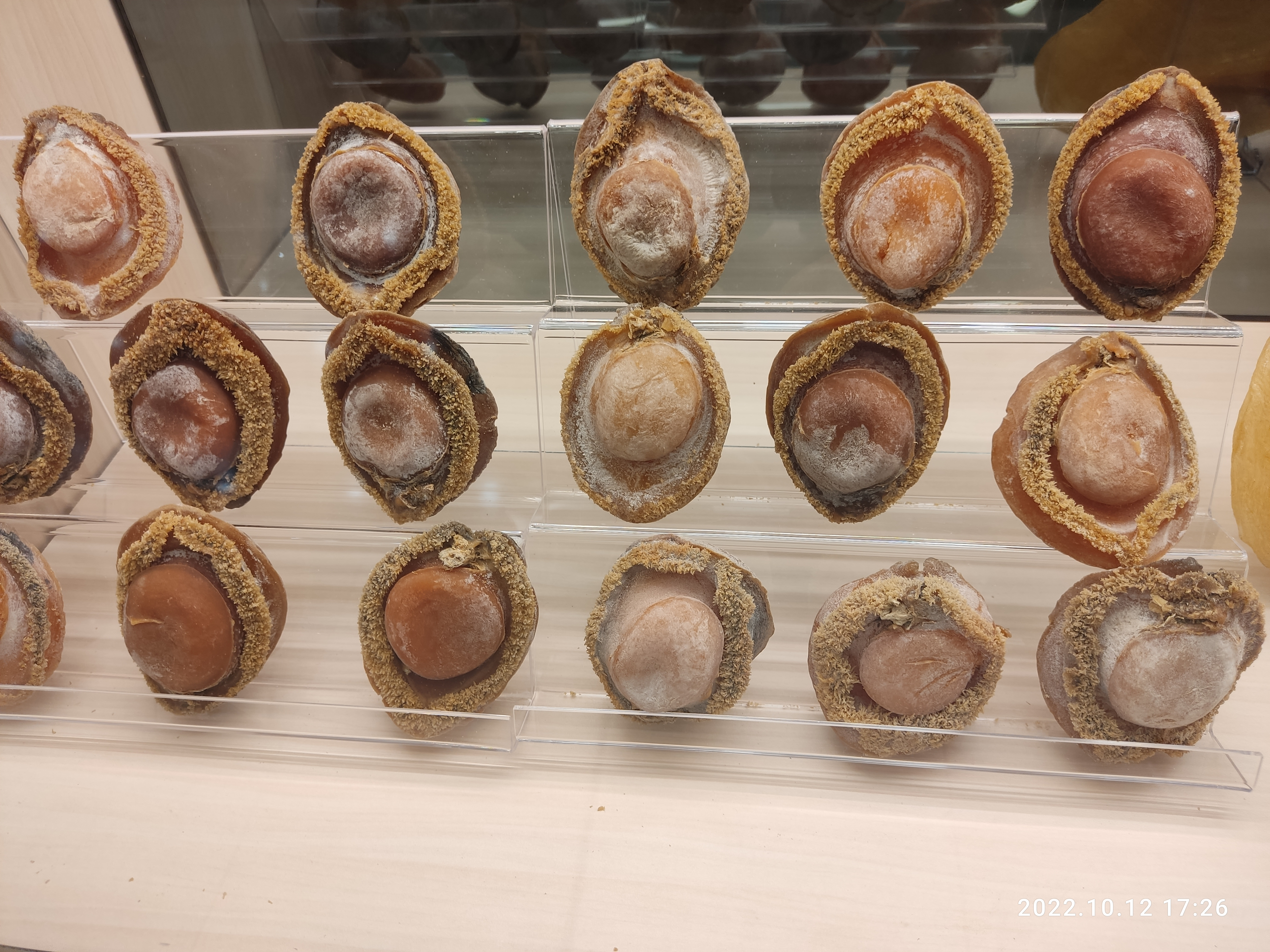
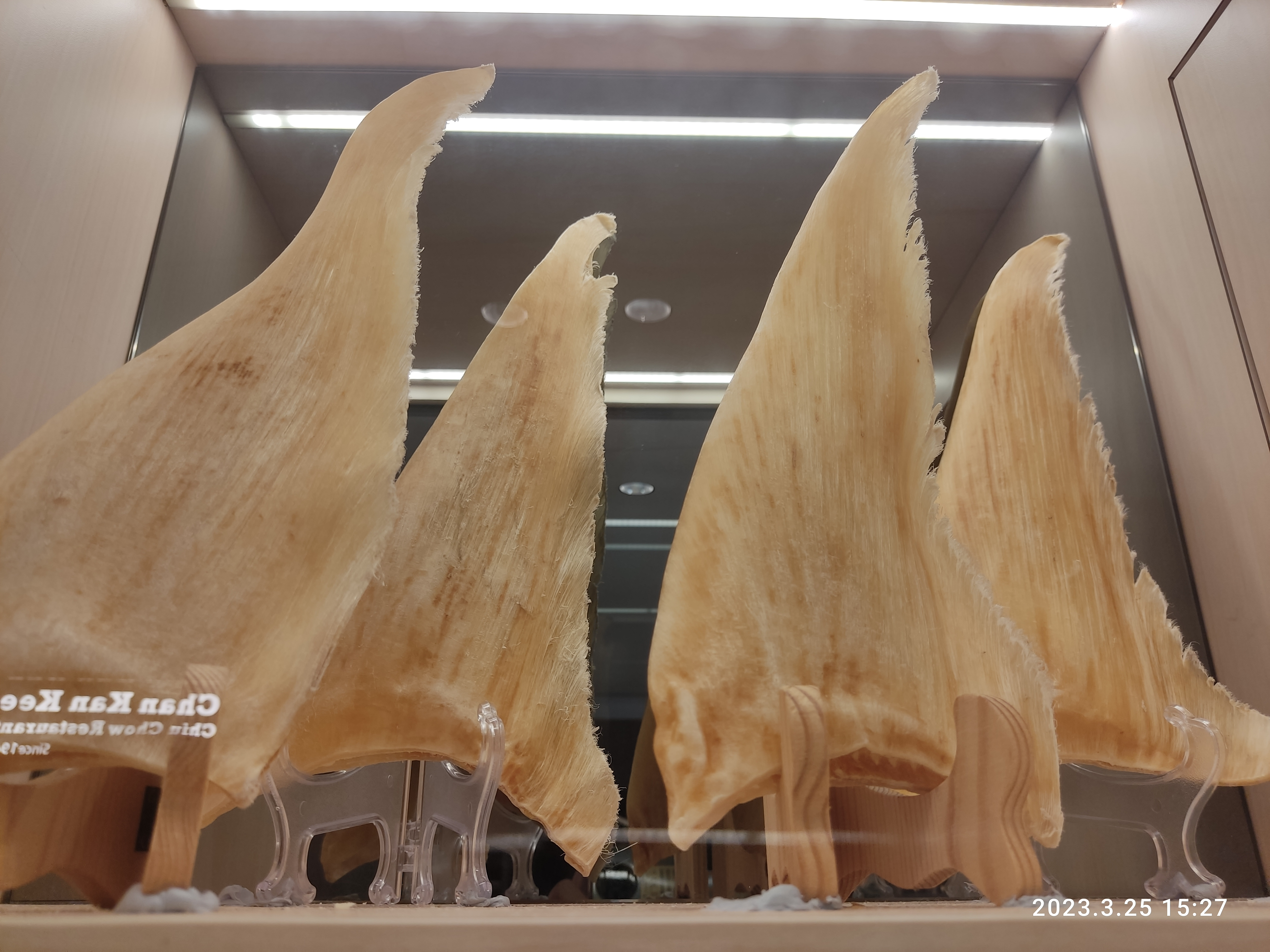
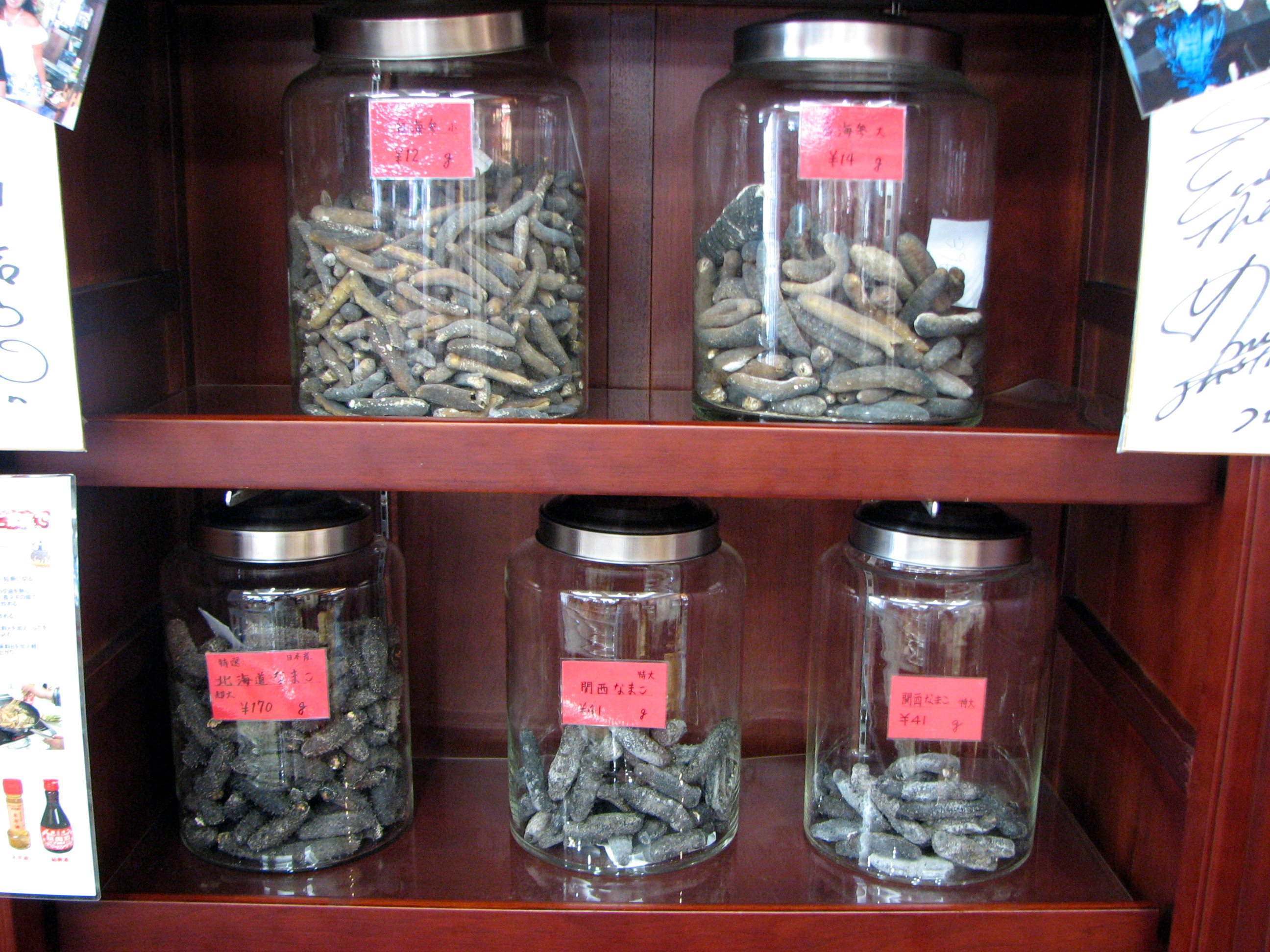
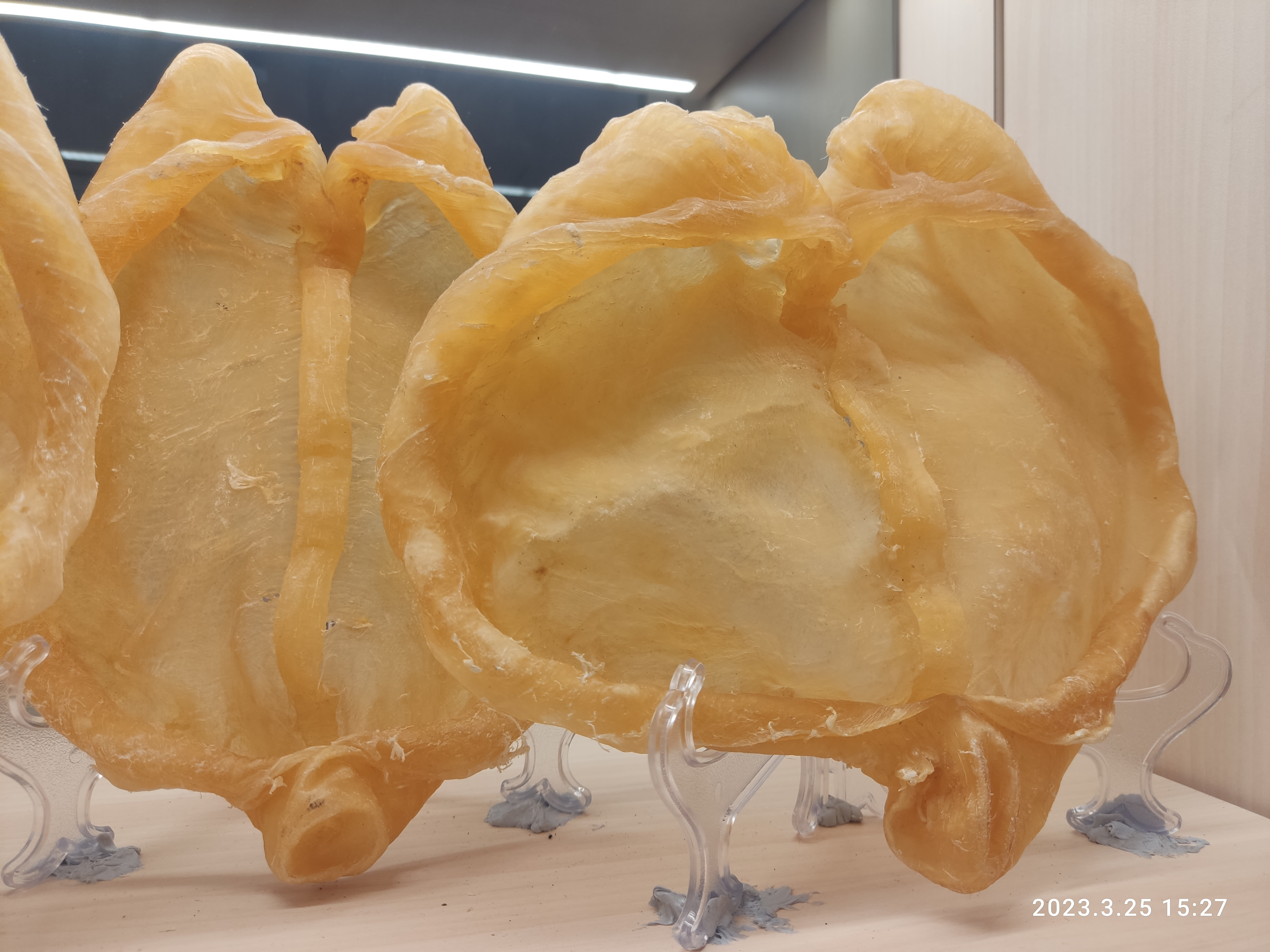
Clockwise from top left, all dried: abalone; shark's fin; fish maw; sea cucumber

== Component foods ==
The four sea delicacies are all often sold dried. They are all defined by unique mouthfeel, with little flavor to the delicacies themselves. Buddha Jumps Over the Wall, a premium Chinese banquet soup, features the four sea delicacies stewed together.

=== Abalone ===
Abalone is the meat of the abalone sea snail. While most abalone comes from aquaculture, demand exists for premium wild-caught abalone; poaching of South African abalone has been impacting populations.

=== Sea cucumber ===
Sea cucumbers are valued as an aphrodisiac due to their phallic shape, as well as reputed to have other beneficial properties under traditional Chinese medicine. Sea cucumber is largely farmed in aquaculture, but demand for the endangered Thelenota ananas persists for its perceived superior quality.

=== Shark's fin ===
Shark's fin is the dorsal fin of sharks. Shark finning is the practice of removing the shark's fin from the shark while it is still alive and throwing the shark back to sea, where it dies. Shark finning peaked in the mid-2010s, until numerous governments restricted shark finning practices following environmental activist backlash. The government of China has omitted shark's fin from state banquets since 2014.

=== Fish maw ===
Fish maw is the prepared swim bladder of teleost fish. While fish maw is eaten from a wide variety of fish, and may make use of otherwise discarded by-product, demand for premium fish maw from large Sciaenidae has driven exploitation of wild populations in the wildlife trade, particularly of the totoaba in Mexico.

== See also ==
- Eight Immortals Crossing the Sea Gamboling Around the Arhat
- Edible bird's nest
- Chinese food therapy
- Customs and etiquette in Chinese dining
- Chinese cooking techniques
