= RFU (disambiguation) =

Rugby Football Union is the national governing body for rugby union in England.

RFU may also refer to:

- Russian Football Union
- Relative fluorescence units in DNA testing
- Rosalind Franklin University
