= Boesemania =

Scientific classification
- Kingdom: Animalia
- Phylum: Chordata
- Class: Actinopterygii
- Order: Acanthuriformes
- Family: Sciaenidae
- Genus: Boesemania; Trewavas, 1977

Type species
- Johnius microlepis Bleeker, 1858

Genus of fishes

Boesemania is a genus of marine ray-finned fishes belonging to the family Sciaenidae, the drums and croakers. These fishes are found in the Indo-West Pacific region.

== Taxonomy ==
Boesemania was first proposed as a monospecific genus in 1977 by the English ichthyologist Ethelwynn Trewavas with Johnius microlepis, which had been described in 1858 by Pieter Bleeker from Palembang on Sumatra, designated as its type species and its only species. Later, B. polykladiskos was added from Bahaba.

== Species ==
The currently recognized species in this genus are:

- Boesemania microlepis (Bleeker, 1858) (Smallscale Croaker)
- Boesemania polykladiskos (Bleeker, 1852) (Spine bahaba)

== Distribution and habitat ==
Boesemania is found in the Indo-West Pacific with one marine species from the Western Pacific and one freshwater species from Southeast Asia. Both species can also be found in brackish water.
