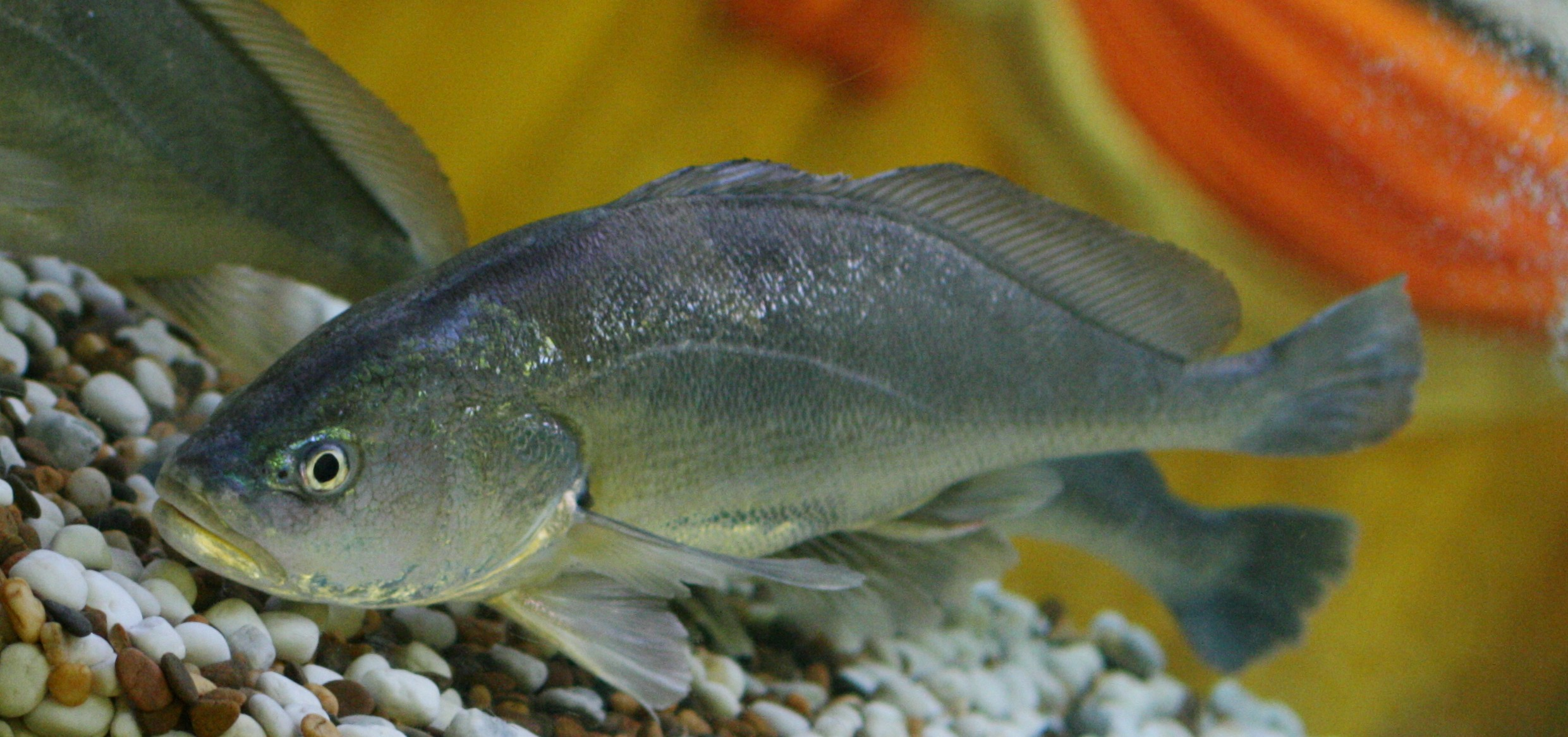

Conservation status
- Data Deficient (IUCN 3.1)

Scientific classification
- Kingdom: Animalia
- Phylum: Chordata
- Class: Actinopterygii
- Order: Acanthuriformes
- Family: Sciaenidae
- Genus: Boesemania
- Species: B. microlepis

Binomial name
- Boesemania microlepis (Bleeker, 1858)

Synonyms
- Johnius microlepis Bleeker, 1858; Otolithoides aeneocorpus Fowler, 1935; Pseudosciaena microlepis (Bleeker, 1858)

= Boesemania microlepis =

Genus of freshwater fish

Boesemania microlepis is a species of freshwater fish in the family Sciaenidae in the order Acanthuriformes. Also known as the Boeseman croaker and smallscale croaker, this fish lives in southeast Asian rivers.

== Taxonomy ==
Boesemania was first proposed as a monospecific genus in 1977 by the English ichthyologist Ethelwynn Trewavas with Johnius microlepis, which had been described in 1858 by Pieter Bleeker from Palembang on Sumatra, designated as its type species and its only species. Later, B. polykladiskos was added from Bahaba.

== Description ==
Boesemania microlepis is a relatively large species, reaching a maximum published standard length of 100 cm (39 in), although 20 cm (7.9 in) is more typical, and 18 kg (40 lb) in weight. This species has a thin caudal peduncle. The mouth is terminal, a little oblique and the upper jaw reaches back as far as the posterior edge of the eye. There are small and large teeth in both jaws, but there are no canine-like teeth. In the upper jaw the large ones make up the outer rows and in the lower jaw they make up the inner rows. The dorsal fin his supported by 9 to 10, typically 10, spines and ten there is an incision, with the fin behind the incision supported by a single spine and between 27 and 34 soft rays. The anal fin is supported by 2 spines and 7 soft rays, with the second spine being very elongated. The caudal fin is pointed. There are cycloid scales on the snout and cheek and ctenoid scales elsewhere. The lateral line scales extend to the tip of the caudal fin. The swim bladder is shaped like a carrot, with a pair of forward-directed appendages and 5 or 6 pairs of rearward-directed appendages, all tube-like and commencing at the anterior end of the swim bladder. The forward directed appendages enter the head beyond transverse septum, and rearwards directed appendages extend to nearly two thirds of the way along the swim bladder. They are greyish brown on the sides and back, paler ventrally and there are indistinct dark transverse lines on back. The fins are yellow with a light mottling of dark spots on the dorsal and caudal fin.

== Distribution ==
Boesemania microlepis lives in the mainland Southeast Asia (Cambodia, Laos, Vietnam, and Thailand) as well as in Sumatra (Indonesia). It is found in several rivers such as the Mekong, Chao Phraya River, Mae Klong, Nan River, Tha Chin River, and Bang Pakong River.

== Habitat and behaviour ==
Boesemania microlepis appears to be sedentary. It prefers large, flowing rivers. During the peak of the dry season, it spawns in deepwater pools. During this time, common to other croakers, it can be heard to make loud, continuous, croaking sounds.

== Diet ==
Boesemania microlepis eats mostly small fishes and crustaceans such as shrimps.

== Threats ==
Desired as food, and expensive in southern Laos, Thailand and northeast Cambodia, this species has become increasingly threatened due to overfishing.
