= Otolithes arabicus =

Conservation status
- Least Concern (IUCN 3.1)

Scientific classification
- Kingdom: Animalia
- Phylum: Chordata
- Class: Actinopterygii
- Order: Acanthuriformes
- Family: Sciaenidae
- Genus: Otolithes
- Species: O. arabicus

Binomial name
- Otolithes arabicus Y.-J. Lin, Qurban, K. N. Shen and Chao, 2019

Species of marine ray-finned fish

Otolithes arabicus, the Arabian tigertooth croaker, is a species of marine ray-finned fish belonging to the family Sciaenidae, the drums and croakers. This species is found in the Persian Gulf and Gulf of Oman in the northern Indian Ocean. This species was first recognised as a distinct species from O. ruber and described in 2019.
