= Spine bahaba =

Conservation status
- Data Deficient (IUCN 3.1)

Scientific classification
- Kingdom: Animalia
- Phylum: Chordata
- Class: Actinopterygii
- Order: Acanthuriformes
- Family: Sciaenidae
- Genus: Boesemania
- Species: B. polykladiskos

Binomial name
- Boesemania polykladiskos (Bleeker, 1852)

Synonyms
- Corvina polykladiskos Bleeker, 1852; Pseudosciaena polykladiskos (Bleeker, 1852); Bahaba polykladiskos (Bleeker, 1852)

Species of fish

The spine bahaba (Boesemania polykladiskos) is a species of ray-finned fish belonging to the family Sciaenidae, the drums and croakers. This fish is found in brackish and marine waters in the shallow coastal waters of Southeast Asia.
