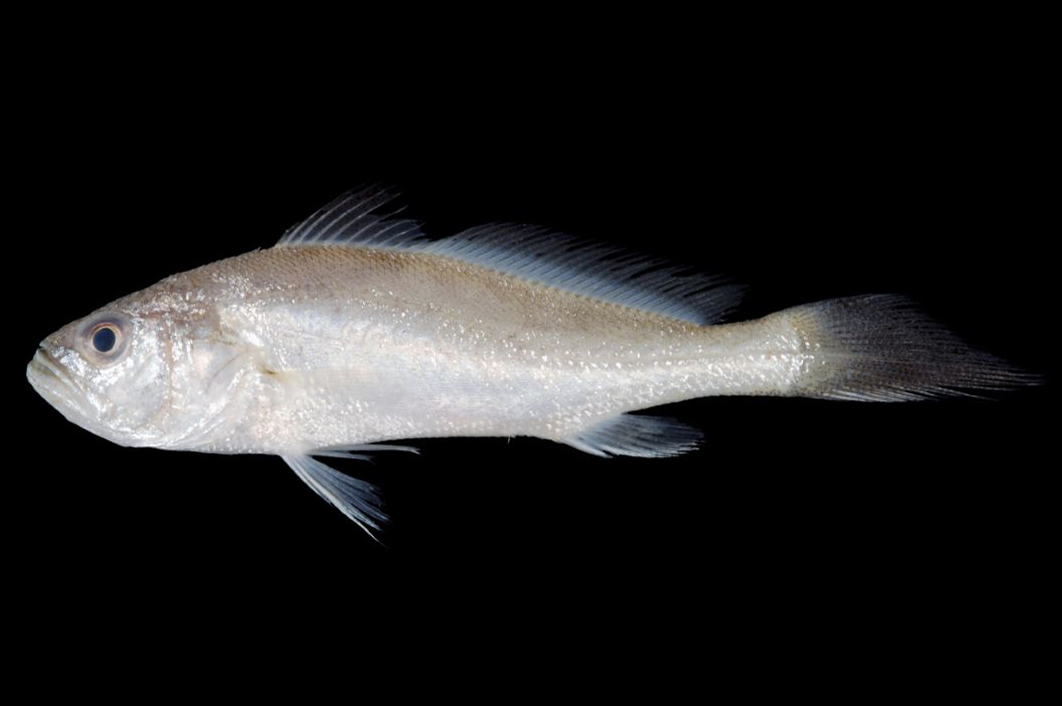

Conservation status
- Least Concern (IUCN 3.1)

Scientific classification
- Kingdom: Animalia
- Phylum: Chordata
- Class: Actinopterygii
- Order: Acanthuriformes
- Family: Sciaenidae
- Genus: Otolithes
- Species: O. ruber

Binomial name
- Otolithes ruber (Bloch & Schneider, 1801)

Synonyms
- Johnius ruber Bloch & Scheider, 1801; Otolithoides ruber (Bloch & Schneider, 1801); Otolithus ruber (Bloch & Schneider, 1801); Otolithus versicolor Cuvier, 1829; Otolithus argenteus Cuvier, 1830; Otolithes argenteus (Cuvier, 1830); Otolithus tridentifer Richardson, 1846; Otolithus orientalis Seale, 1910

= Otolithes ruber =

Species of fish

Otolithes ruber, commonly known as the tigertooth croaker, silver teraglin, wiretooth, snapper kob, snapper salmon, Yankee whiting or Yankee salmon is a species of marine ray-finned fish belonging to the family Sciaenidae, the drums and croakers. This species is found in the Indo-Pacific region.

== Taxonomy ==
Otolithes ruber was first formally described in 1801 as Johnius ruber by the German naturalists Marcus Elieser Bloch and Johann Gottlob Theaenus Schneider with the "Indian Ocean" given as its type locality. In 1817 Lorenz Oken proposed the new genus Otolithes for this species and in 1863 Theodore Gill designated Johnius ruber as the type species of the genus. The genus Otolithes is included in the subfamily Otolithinae by some workers, but the 5th edition of Fishes of the World does not recognise subfamilies within the Sciaenidae, which it places in the order Acanthuriformes.

It had been recognised that there were more than two taxonomic units, or lineages, within Otolithes and that these may represent previously unrecognised cryptic species and in 2019 O. arabicus from the Persian Gulf was described as a third species in the genus, distinct from O. ruber and there may be a fourth, as yet undescribed, species in the western Indian Ocean which is found from South Africa to Gujarat.

== Etymology ==
Otolithes ruber has the specific name ruber which means "red", the fish was described as red but is, in fact, silvery.

== Description ==
Otolithes ruber has a brownish upper body, frequently showing diagonal black streaking, while the lower body is silvery with a gold lustre. The anal fin, pectoral fins and pelvic fins are reddish brown. The dorsal fin has 10 spines in the first part of the fin, an incision, then a single spine and between 27 and 30 soft rays supporting the fin to the rear of the incision. The anal fin is supported by 2 spines and 7 soft rays. This species reaches a maximum published total length of 90 cm (35 in), although 40 cm (16 in) is more typical.

== Distribution and habitat ==
Otolithes ruber is found in the Indo-West Pacific from South Africa and Madagascar east into the Western Pacific as far as eastern Australia. However, the population in the western Indian Ocean may represent a different species. It occurs at depths between 3 and 100 m (9.8 and 328.1 ft) in brackish and marine waters over sand, mud and rock substrates.

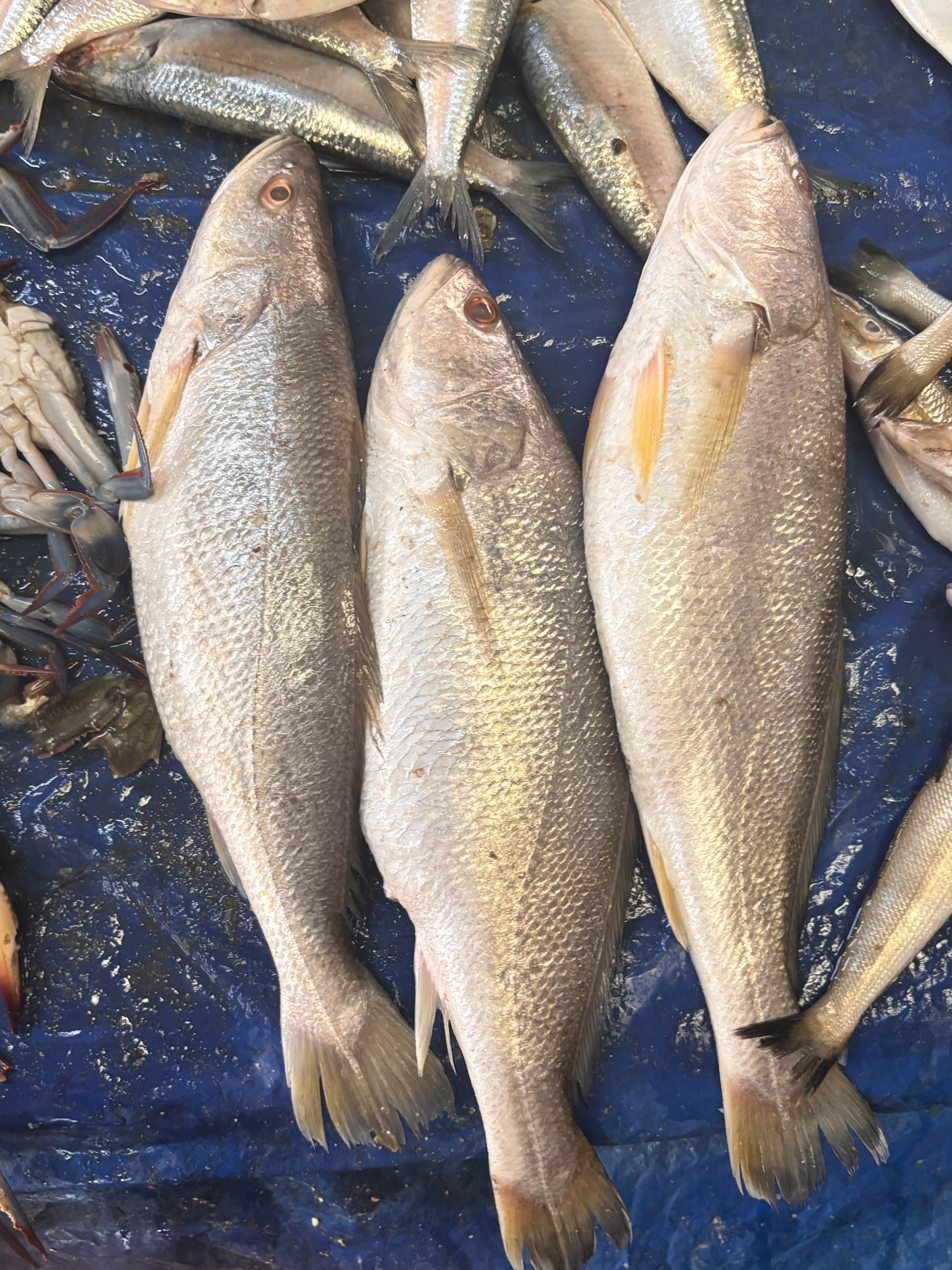
Otolithes ruber from Mangaluru, karnataka, India

== Biology ==
Otolithes ruber feed on planktonic crustaceans near the surface as juveniles and as adults they prey on benthic invertebrates and fishes.

== Fisheries ==
Otolithes ruber is caught in mixed species fisheries and as bycatch throughout its range. The fish landed are sold fresh or preserved by drying or salting.
