= Chaptis bahaba =

Conservation status
- Data Deficient (IUCN 3.1)

Scientific classification
- Kingdom: Animalia
- Phylum: Chordata
- Class: Actinopterygii
- Order: Acanthuriformes
- Family: Sciaenidae
- Genus: Bahaba
- Species: B. chaptis

Binomial name
- Bahaba chaptis (Hamilton, 1822)

Synonyms
- Bola chaptis Hamilton, 1822

Species of fish

The chaptis bahaba (Bahaba chaptis) is a species of ray-finned fish belonging to the family Sciaenidae, the drums and croakers. This fish is found in brackish and marine waters in the lower reaches of rivers and coastal waters of the Bay of Bengal in India, Bangladesh and Myanmar.
