= Fish maw =

Fish bladder as food

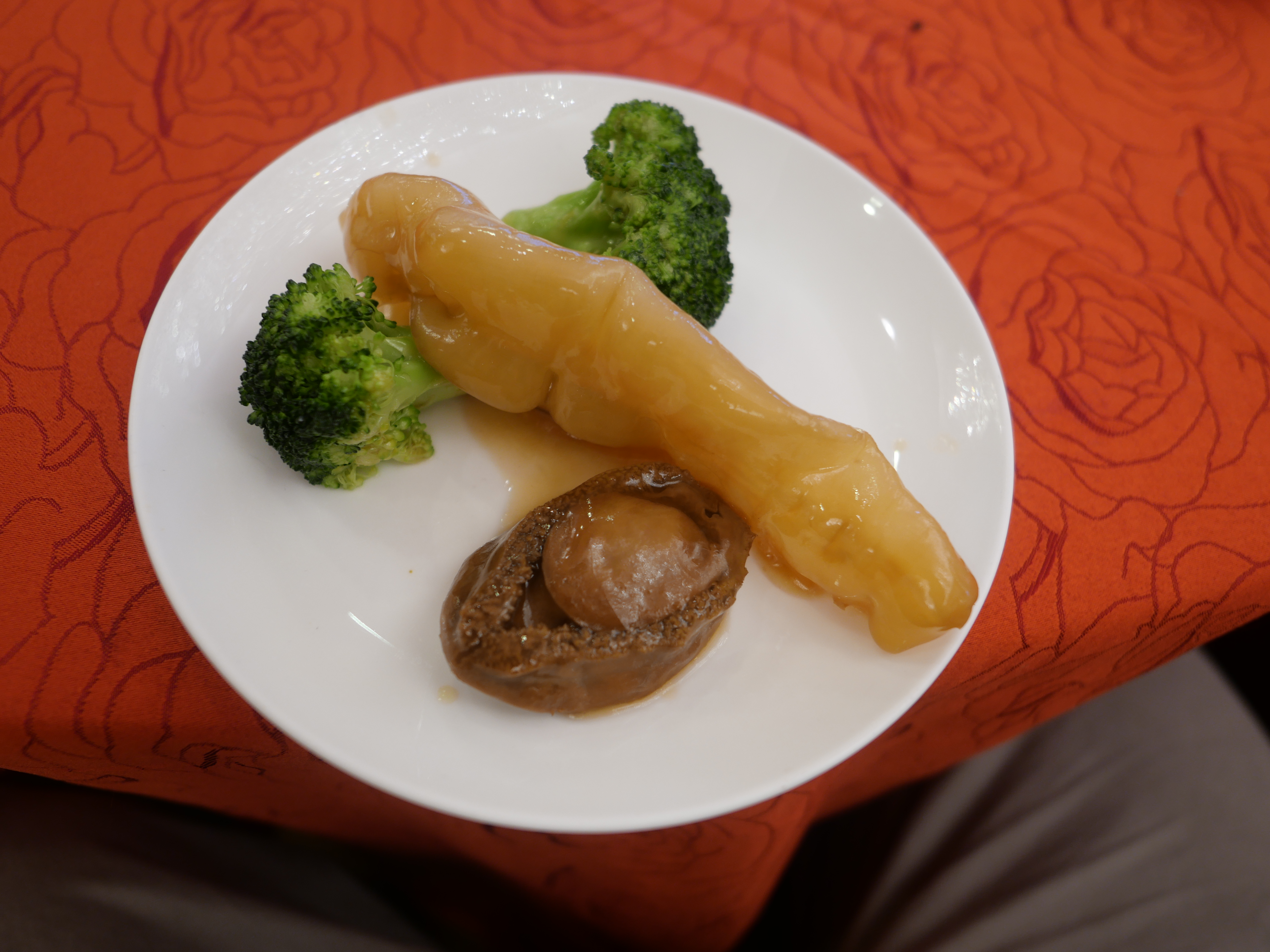
- Fish maw with abalone and broccoli
- Alternative names: Fish sound Translations: Chinese: 魚肚, yúdǔ; Yue Chinese: 花胶, fa kau; Mandarin Chinese: 花膠, huājiāo; Spanish: buches; Portuguese: sames
- Type: Fish, offal
- Associated cuisine: Canadian cuisine; Chinese cuisine; Peranakan cuisine; Portuguese cuisine; Thai cuisine
- Main ingredients: Swim bladder

Chinese name
- Traditional Chinese: 花膠
- Simplified Chinese: 花胶
Transcriptions
Standard Mandarin
- Hanyu Pinyin: huājiāo

Alternative Chinese name
- Traditional Chinese: 魚肚
- Simplified Chinese: 鱼肚
Transcriptions
Standard Mandarin
- Hanyu Pinyin: yúdù

Second alternative Chinese name
- Traditional Chinese: 魚鰾
- Simplified Chinese: 鱼鳔
Transcriptions
Standard Mandarin
- Hanyu Pinyin: yúbiào

Fish maw (also fish sound) is the swim bladder (Note: Fish maw is sometimes mistranslated or erroneously identified as the stomach.) of a fish, eaten as offal. Typically dried or fried but also cooked from fresh, fish maw is largely collagen. It is a traditional food in cuisines dominated by fishing, and a particular delicacy in Chinese cuisine—one of the four sea delicacies—as well as a valued ingredient in traditional Chinese medicine. The modern demand for fish maw from Pacific Asia supports wildlife trade worldwide for quality fish maw, which has in turn led to wildlife smuggling and poaching.

== Description ==
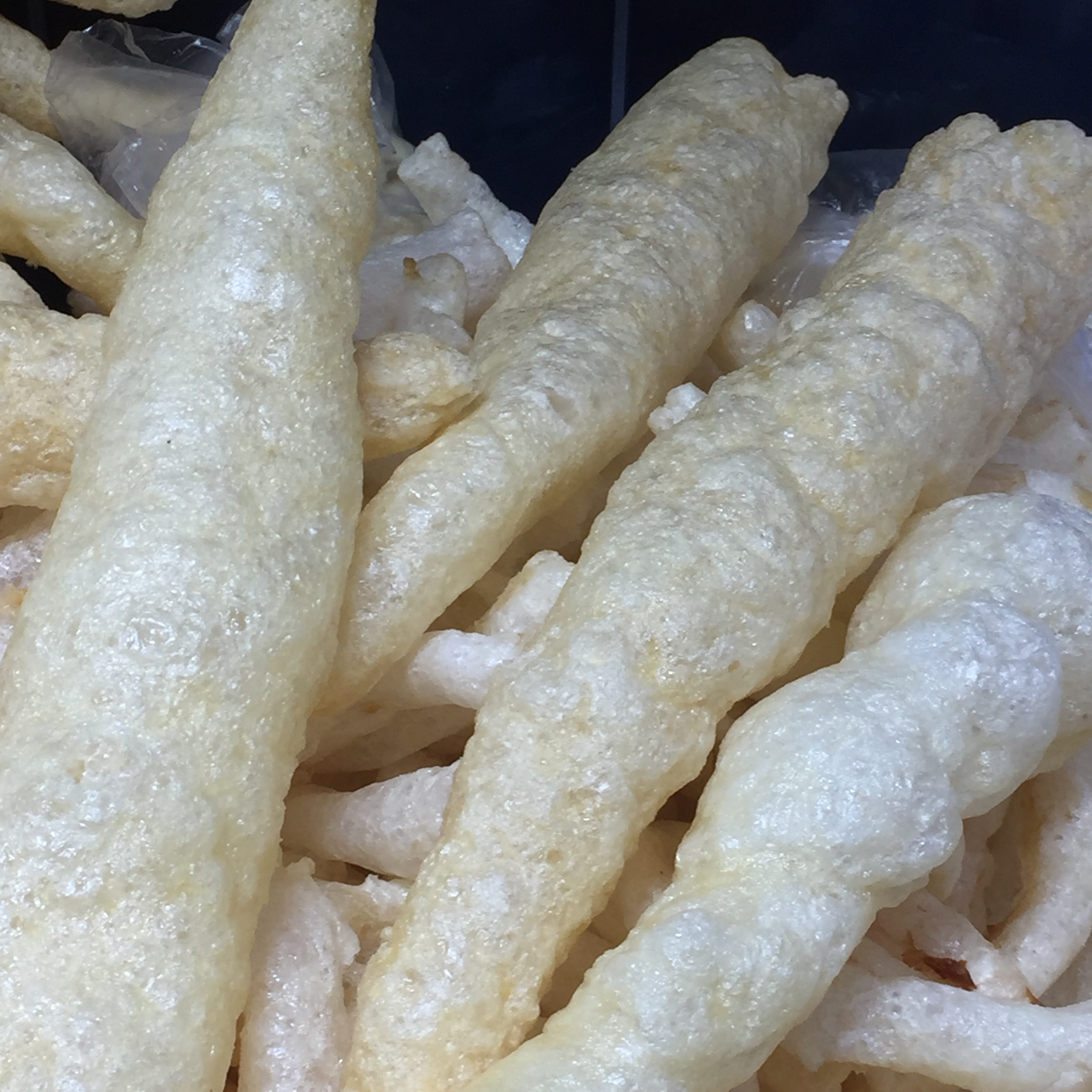
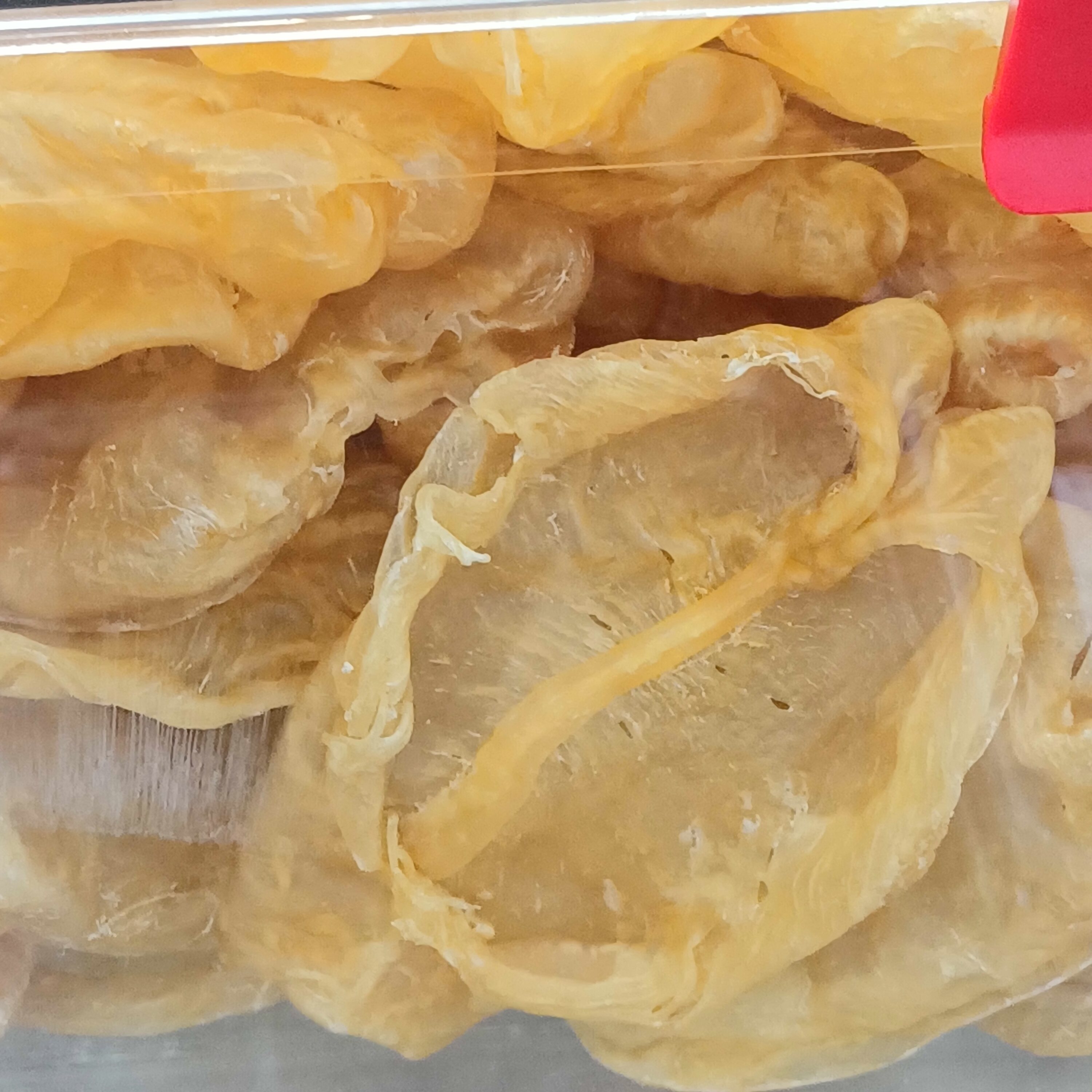
Fish maw is largely purchased by consumers either fried (left, a.k.a. "oily") or dried (right). Both preparations are soaked before cooking.

Fish maw is typically preserved by either drying or frying. The standard for fish maw is a consistent white-yellow color with minimal odor. Fish maw is prepared by soaking, and takes on a soft yet toothsome, slippery consistency when cooked.

The size and body weight ratio of swim bladders varies significantly depending on the region and species: on the Arafura Sea, an average fish bladder weighs 40 grams (1.4 oz), in a ~1:112.5 ratio against the total fish's weight; on the coast of Brazil, maw to flesh ratio ranges from 1:20 to 1:70; and in Vietnam, pangasius maw is a 1:7 weight ratio.

== Trade ==
The swim bladder is attached to the fish's spine, and is removed during processing. High value fish maw is typically removed and dried onboard fishing vessels when conditions allow.

Established commercial fishing industries worldwide sell swim bladders as by-product to fish maw importers. In 2018, the Norwegian fishing industry supplied over 25% of the world fish maw market share, largely with codfish, followed by Russia at 14.9%. Other prominent exporters in the Chinese fish maw import market include Iceland, which exports cod and true ling, and New Zealand, which exports Genypterus blacodes or New Zealand ling.

The Chinese demand for wild-caught fish maw, particularly from exotic foreign fish, has increased significantly since the reform and opening up of China. The greatest determiner of value is the origin species. Sciaenidae (croakers or drums) maw demands the highest price, for its perceived superior quality over other species. The average price per kilogram for fish maw is 72 times higher than the price of flesh, and can reach over 8000 times higher in extreme circumstances like the totoaba trade; in these cases, the rest of the fish becomes byproduct, and is often discarded.

=== Atlantic ===
The fish maw trade in Brazil has grown significantly since fishermen pivoted from the shark's fin trade; the Brazilian government banned shark finning in 2012, and has introduced other restrictions on shark fishing since. Between 2015 and 2018, Brazil was the largest exporter of fish maw to Hong Kong at 3,300 tonnes (3,600 short tons), valued at HK$3 billion; 95% of exported maws came from Para, Brazil. Brazilian export of fish byproducts, including fish maw, increased by 398% from 2012 to 2020; 97% of fish byproducts were exported to China in 2021. Mirroring worldwide trends, Sciaenidae maw fetches the highest price at market in Brazil; Ariidae maw, although being significantly larger, is frequently sold in unsorted bulk (Portuguese: ariru).

=== Indian Ocean ===
As of 2022, India is one of five countries that produced 50% of the world fish bladder supply and 70% of its value. The Indian swim bladder trade dates back to the 1800s for isinglass production, and has been regulated by the Indian government under the Harmonized System since 2002. Increasing demand from East Asia has driven fishing of croakers in particular, fueling an auction market in the major fishing and export ports Chennai, Kolkata, Mumbai and Veraval. There is little domestic Indian demand for fish maw.

Bangladesh has a developing fish maw trade in the Karnaphuli delta targeting the high-value maws of Johnius coitor (datina koral) and Pomadasys argenteus, and Indian salmon. Less valuable but still traded fish maw species include Pangasius hypophthalmus, Labeo rohita, Catla catla, Wallago attu, and Leptomelanosoma indicum.

=== East Africa ===
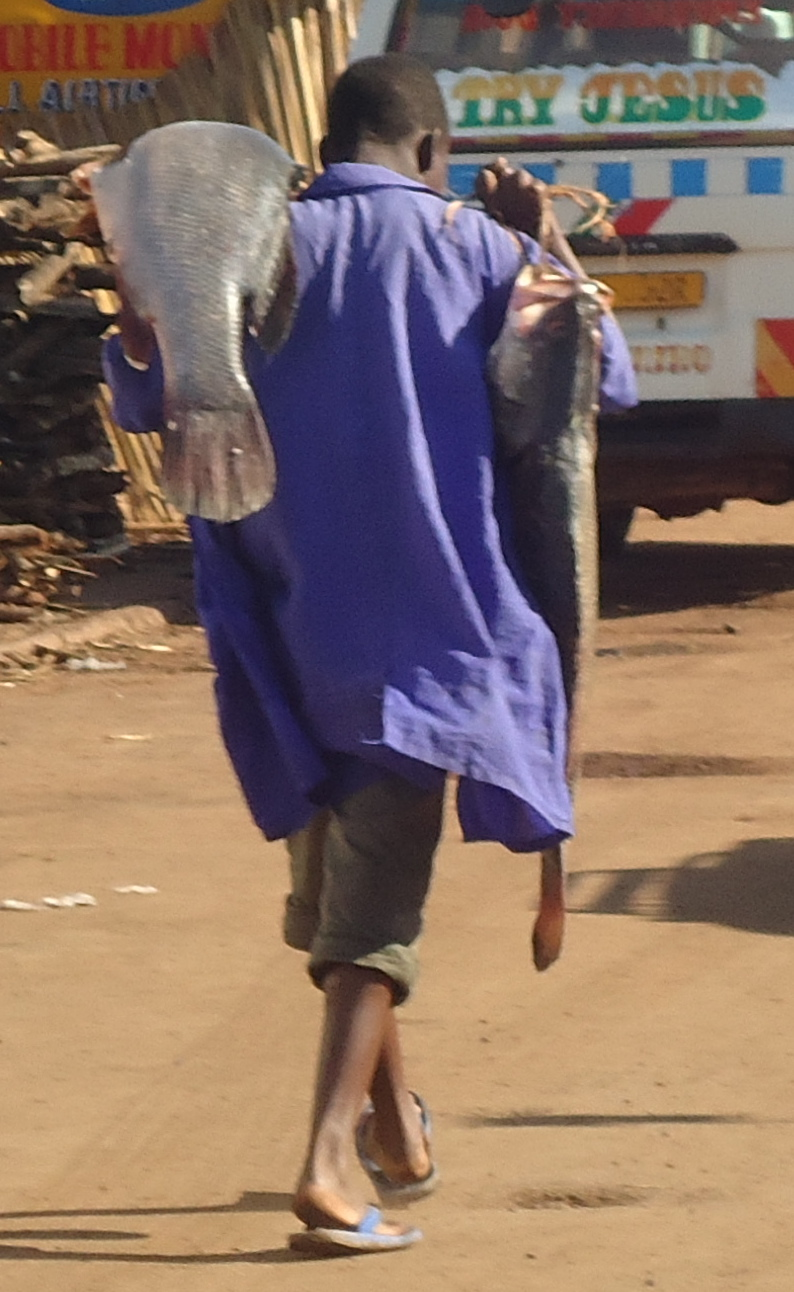
Ugandan man carrying Nile perch, Ggaba landing site

Introduced in the 1950s, the population of Nile perch in Lake Victoria has been targeted for its maw since the mid-2010s in Uganda, Kenya and Tanzania. Originally, skiff owners contract fishermen to fish for perch; the owners pay the fishermen, retain the fish and sell the maws to fish maw export companies. In 2018, the Government of Uganda introduced a law where the fish maw could not be removed until resale to a fish processing plant; official production of fish maw dropped sharply, possibly due to under-reporting from smuggling. In 2021, the government introduced a 7-percent export tariff on fish maw, in anticipation of a Chinese trade deal; the September 2024 Forum on China–Africa Cooperation eliminated the tariffs.

=== Central & East Indo-Pacific ===
2024 Vietnamese export of pangasius maw has increased to about US$58,000,000, with 38% going to China and the rest to Thailand, Malaysia, Singapore and the USA. The Vietnam News Agency claims that the falling totoaba population has incentivized Chinese import of alternative maw.

The island and seas of New Guinea see significant fish maw production. Since 2012, in and around the Kikori River delta of Papua New Guinea, the scaly croaker Nibea squamosa has been targeted in gillnetting for its extremely high-priced maw, selling for as much as US$15,615 per kilogram.

== Consumption by region ==
=== North Atlantic ===
Recipes for fish maw, specifically codfish maw, are documented in Hannah Glasse's 1747 English cuisine cookbook The Art of Cookery Made Plain and Easy: fish maw is presented in gravy, broiled, and as a fricassee. Cod maw was later described as a 'delicacy' in the 1911 American food industry encyclopedia, The Grocer's Encyclopedia, by Artemas Ward.

Cod maw is a traditional food of Newfoundland, owing to the ubiquity of the cod fishing industry. It was typically salted for preservation until use, then boiled and stewed. The popularity of cod maw dropped in the late 20th century along with cod tongue and cheeks, but has begun to see a resurgence with culinary tourism and interest in nose to tail eating.

In Portugal, Codfish maw (Portuguese: sames) was salted and brought to shore to be eaten as a fisherman's dish. Portuguese sailors from Figueira da Foz would rely on codfish maw as a byproduct of cod fishing in Newfoundland. Feijoada is traditionally made with fish maw instead of pork in Figueira da Foz (Feijoada de sames).

=== China ===
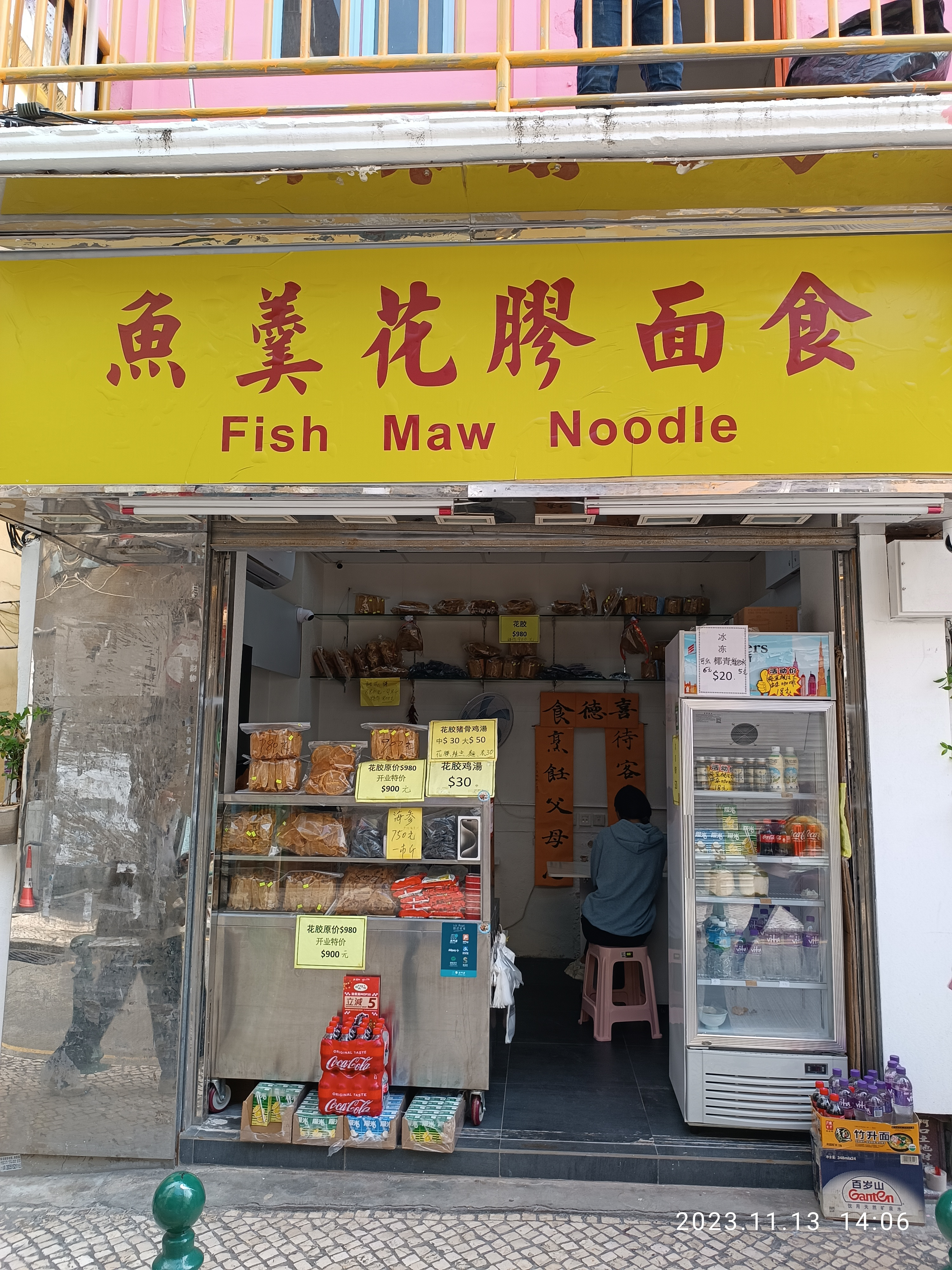
Fish maw noodle shop, Macau, China

Fish maw (Chinese: 魚肚, yúdǔ or Chinese: 鱼鳔, yúbiào; Yue Chinese: 花胶, fa kau; Mandarin Chinese: 花膠, huājiāo) or "sea ginseng" is a delicacy in Chinese cuisine, particularly Zhejiang cuisine. Consumption of fish maw in China may go back to the Han Dynasty, c. 206 BCE-220 CE. The History of the Southern Dynasties documents fish maw soaked in honey being served in royal court during the Northern and Southern dynasties period, c. 420-589 CE. Consumption of rockfish fish maw was documented in the 6th century Qimin Yaoshu.

Fish maw is one of the four sea delicacies of Chinese cuisine, along with abalone, sea cucumber, and shark's fin. Fish maw from larger fish species is more prestigious; the restaurant trade buys smaller maw. Fish maw from male fish is preferred for its relative thickness and resilience to dissolving. Until the late 20th century, the Chinese bahaba or giant yellow croaker Bahaba taipingensis of the China Seas was the premier source of fish maw. However, overfishing has driven the Chinese bahaba population to near-extinction, and raised demand for similar fish, particular the related Sciaenidae.

Fish maw, particularly of rare fish, is highly valued in traditional Chinese medicine. TCM practitioners recommend fish maw for the post-partum period and recovering from surgery. It is also valued as a cosmetic: its high level of collagen is believed to improve one's skin.

As of 2016, Southern China and Hong Kong had the largest demand for fish maw.

==== Source fish ====
The Environmental Investigation Agency in 2016 estimated that 34 species of fish were being traded on the wider Chinese fish maw market. Sciaenidae (croakers/drums) are typically the most valued, due to their similarity to the historically prized and critically endangered Chinese bahaba. Other targeted fishes include eels, stonefishes, lates perch, groupers, threadfins and sturgeon.

=== Southeast Asia ===
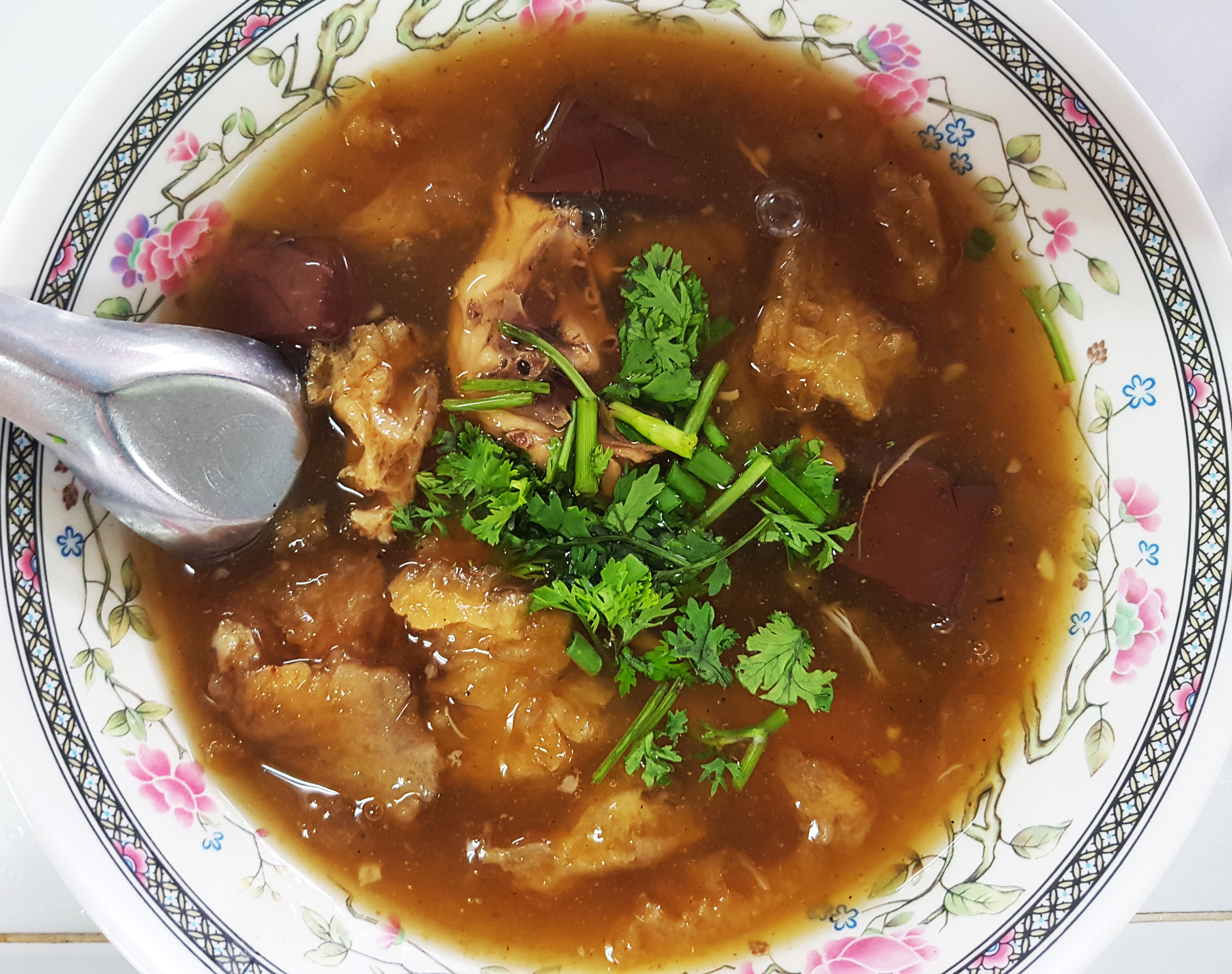
Krapaw pla

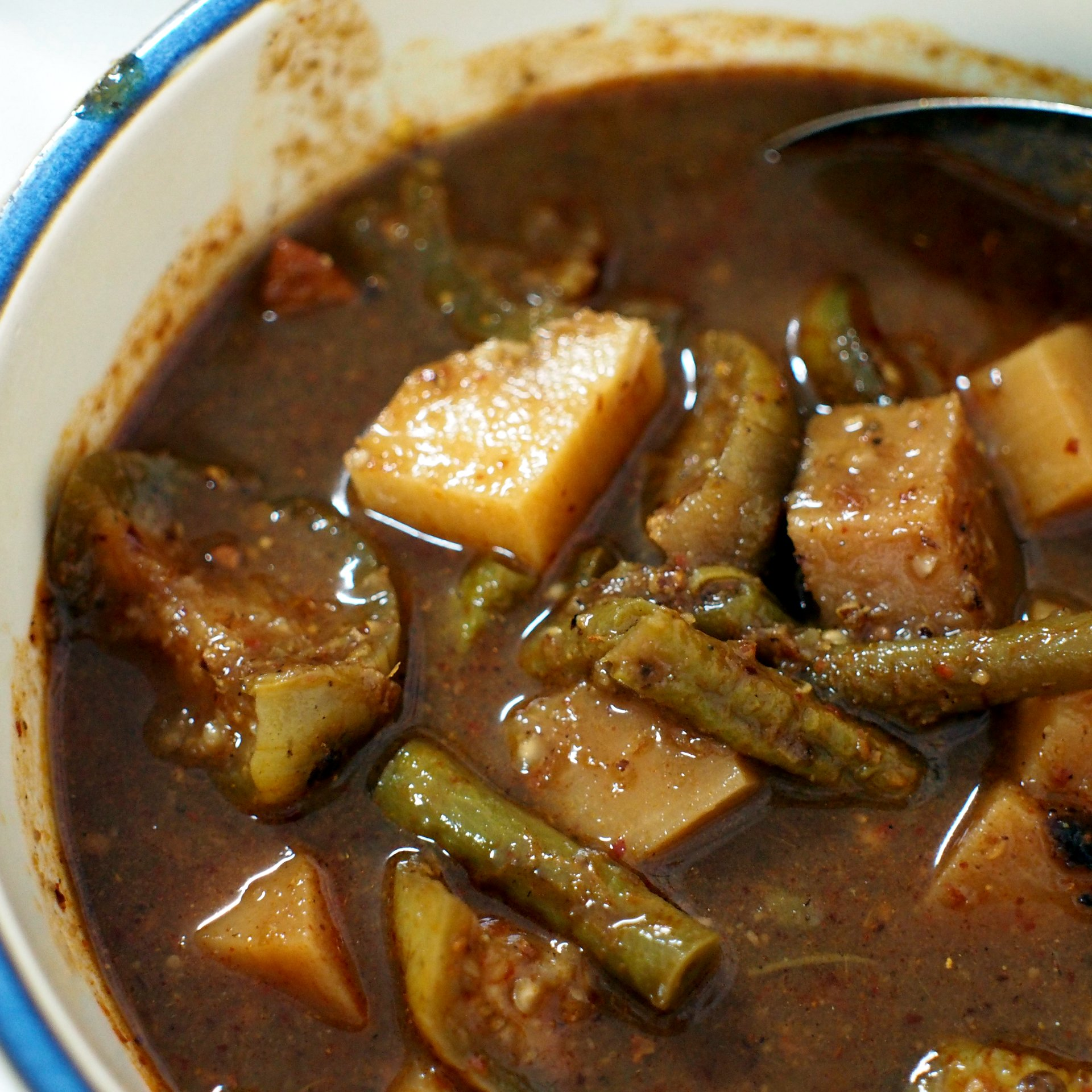
Kaeng tai pla

In Peranakan cuisine across Maritime Southeast Asia, fish maw is a traditional Chinese New Year food. The ingredient features particularly in hee pio soup (a.k.a. hu pioh t'ng), a clear soup of fish maw paired with a varied selection of other vegetables and proteins.

In Thailand, a Thai cuisine fish maw dish is kaeng tai pla (Thai: แกงไตปลา), a Southern Thai fishermen dish featuring tai pla, fermented fish maw. Krapaw pla is a Thai-Chinese fish maw stew in a red braise.

Vietnamese cuisine does not typically feature fish maw, but fish maw is sometimes featured in xúp cua, a Vietnamese crab soup (súp cua bong bóng cá).

== Crime ==
=== Poaching ===
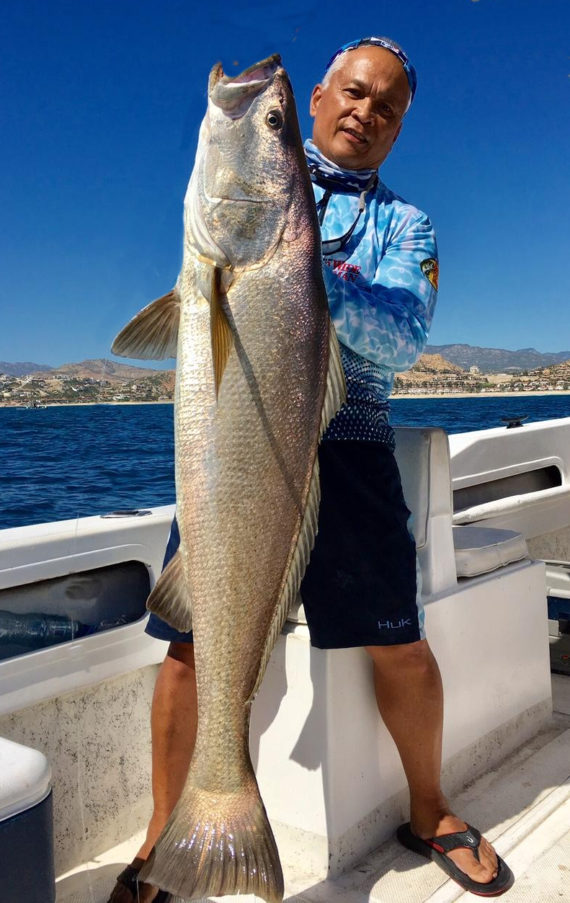
Totoaba caught in 2017

A major target of poaching is the totoaba in the Gulf of California, due to its perceived similarity to the traditional high-grade swim bladder of Bahaba taipingensis. The totoaba, a critically endangered species, is protected by CITES. Poachers use gillnets to capture the totoaba, and often remove the valuable bladder and toss the dead fish into the sea to minimize evidence.

Poaching operations were backed by a transnational organized crime ring known by the moniker 'the Dragon Cartel' (Spanish: Cártel del Dragón): a cooperation between Chinese organized crime and Mexican cartels, particularly the Sinaloa cartel, operating in Mexicali, Baja California. Mexican cartels poached totoaba maw (Spanish: buches) and smuggled them through local restaurateurs to international ports like Vancouver, and traded them with Chinese criminals for the chemical precursors to fentanyl. As of 2021, a single totoaba maw sold for US$3-5,000 equivalent in Mexico, US$10-15,000 in the US, and US$60,000 in China. For its high price and involvement with drug trafficking, totoaba maw has been given the media moniker "cocaine of the sea".

In 2019, internal documents of the Secretariat of Environment and Natural Resources (SEMARNAT) of Mexico claimed that the government has minimally investigated cartel activity. (Note: "An internal report by the Ministry of the Environment and Natural Resources presented in August 2019 to the Convention on International Trade in Endangered Species of Wild Fauna and Flora (Cites) in Geneva, Switzerland, says that the Mexican government barely collects information on organised crime despite identifying it as 'a matter of national security in terms of sustainability'.") SEMARNAT's prosecution branch PROFEPA opened 42 investigations into totoaba poaching between 2012 and 2021, resulting in two arrests. In early 2023, Admiral José Rafael Ojeda Durán, the Secretary of the Navy, declared that the Dragon Cartel had been dismantled after a multi-agency operation arrested seven leaders of the ring in Mexico.

=== Counterfeiting ===
In major re-export hubs like Singapore, Malaysia and Hong Kong, fish maw is frequently mislabeled as more expensive varieties of fish, due to high profit incentive and the high level of visual similarity between disparately priced species.

HK Magazine in 2007 described two incidents of counterfeit fish maw in Hong Kong: one of dried rabbit ear, and the other of shoe rubber.

=== Smuggling ===
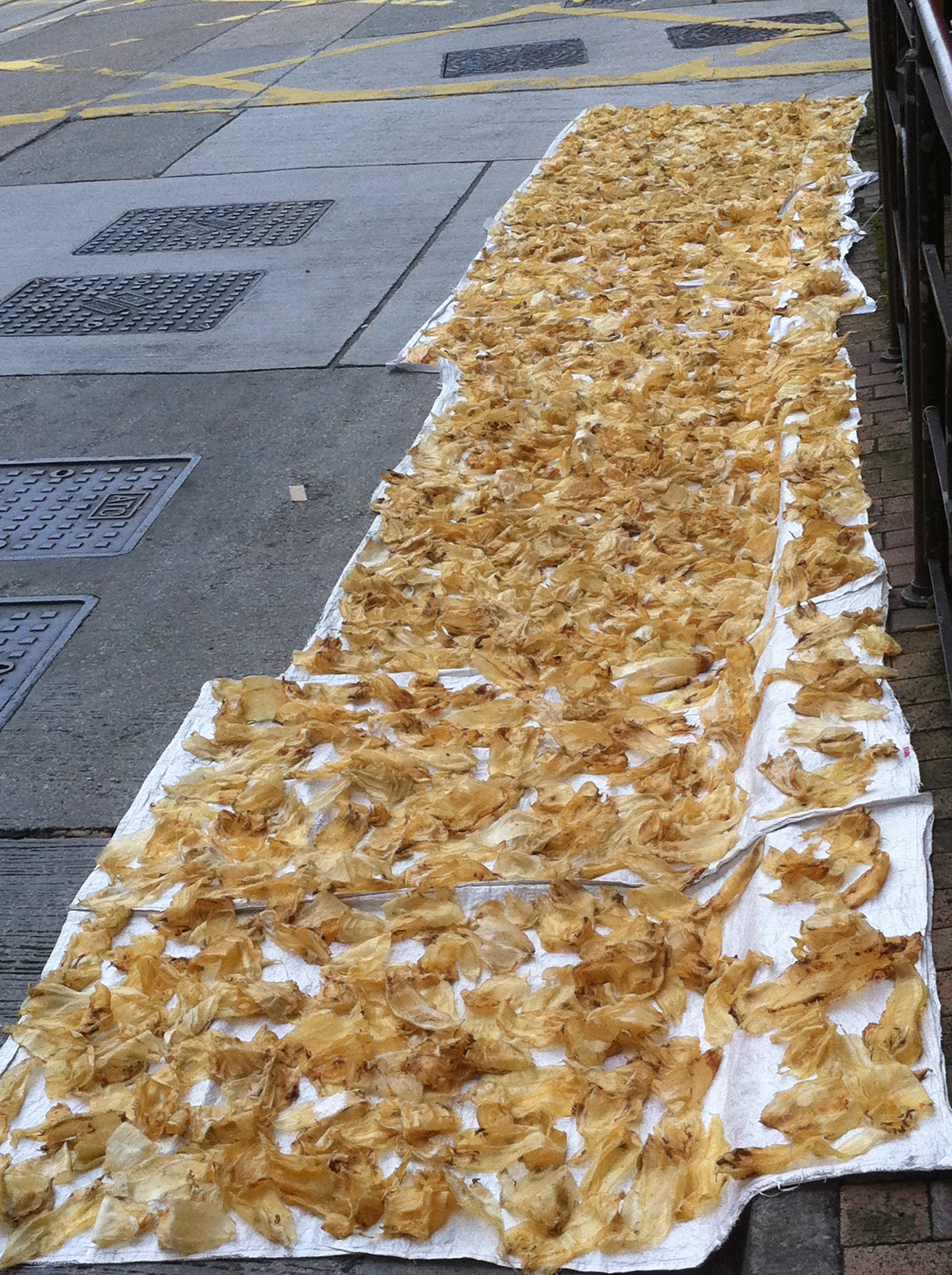
Fish maw, Hong Kong

Hong Kong is a major stop-over for foreign fish maw to be smuggled into mainland China, in order to circumvent food-safety import laws and import duties to mainland China.

In Kenya, fish maw fished from Lake Victoria is smuggled through to Uganda and Tanzania to avoid export duties to China, as China charges a GDP-dependent duty on imports.

=== Side-selling ===
In Lake Victoria fishing operations, there is an endemic issue of contracted fisherman side-selling the maw of Nile perch to middlemen instead of giving the catch to the contractor: middlemen rendezvous and buy maw on the lake, and the fish carcass is discarded into the lake to destroy evidence.

== Environmental impact ==
Hong Kong company Avant Meats has developed a cultured meat replacement for fish maw. As of 2021, the company claims to produce cultured fish maw at a cost of US$70 per pound.

=== Bycatch ===
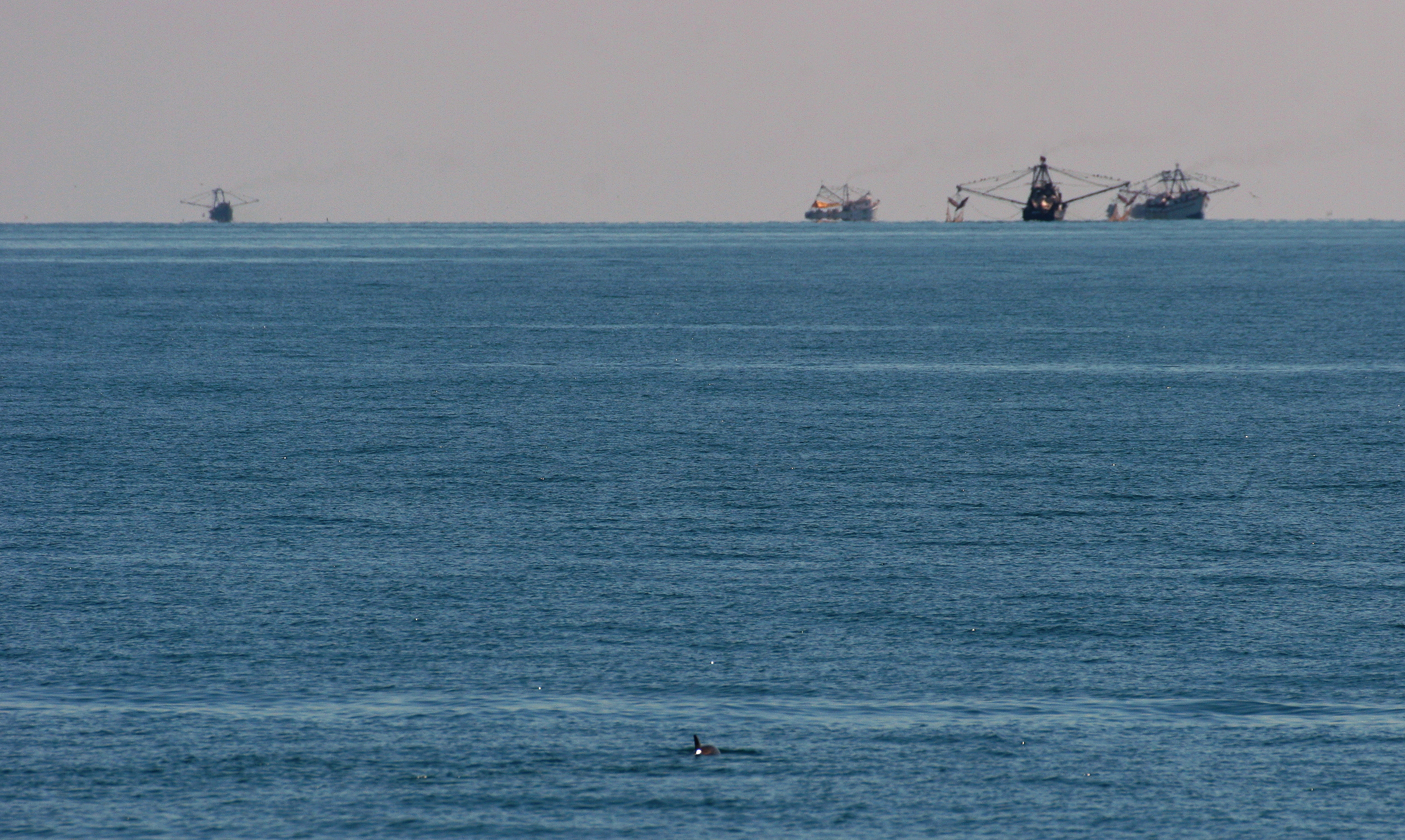
A vaquita (foreground) in the Gulf of California, with fishing boats (background)

Gillnets may be used in fish maw fishing. However, gillnets can have high rates of bycatch. In the Gulf of California, gillnets set by poachers to catch totoaba also inadvertently catch vaquita, a critically endangered porpoise. The population of vaquita dropped 92% from 1997 to 2015, in large part from totoaba poaching. The 2019 documentary Sea of Shadows documented and condemned totoaba poaching and its negative effect on the vaquita population.

In the Kikori River Delta of Papua New Guinea, gillnet fishermen trying to target the scaly croaker Nibea squamosa regularly trap elasmobranchs and dolphins as bycatch: targeted fish make up less than a quarter of the total catch.

=== Dumping ===
In commercial fishing on the Arafura Sea off of Western New Guinea, as much as 51.4% of fish catch by weight was discarded at sea in favor of the swim bladder in 2018.

Fish dumping on Lake Victoria after removing the swim bladder from Nile perch has led to eutrophication of the lake.

=== Fish stocks ===
Overfishing of fish species targeted for their fish bladders has led to fish stock collapse. The first major population decline from the swim bladder trade was of the Chinese bahaba or giant yellow croaker Bahaba taipingensis of the China Seas. While Chinese bahaba fishing was banned for domestic trade in 1989 after the classification of the fish as Class II under the Wildlife Protection Law of the People's Republic of China, the Chinese bahaba population continued to decline and was added to the IUCN Red List in 2009.

The totoaba began to be targeted for its perceived similarity to the Chinese bahaba by the 1920s, and increased in scope until it was categorized as a vulnerable species.

On Lake Victoria, there is increased usage of illegal monofilament nets and targeting of undersized fish, impacting the Nile perch population. Kenya, Uganda and Tanzania have beach patrols and fishing regulations to regulate the fish maw trade.

== See also ==
- Isinglass
- Edible bird's nest
- Tripe
- Intestine as food
