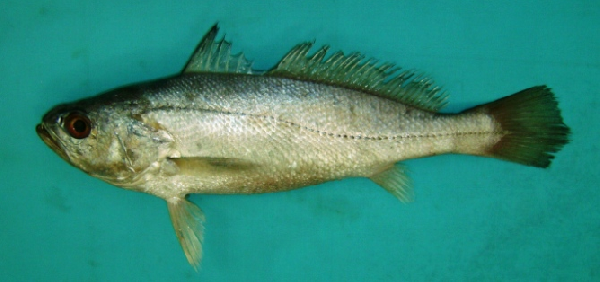

Conservation status
- Least Concern (IUCN 3.1)

Scientific classification
- Kingdom: Animalia
- Phylum: Chordata
- Class: Actinopterygii
- Order: Acanthuriformes
- Family: Sciaenidae
- Genus: Otolithes
- Species: O. cuvieri

Binomial name
- Otolithes cuvieri Trewavas, 1974

Synonyms
- Otolithoides cuvieri (Trewavas, 1974)

= Otolithes cuvieri =

Species of ray-finned fish

Otolithes cuvieri, the lesser tigertooth croaker, is a species of marine ray-finned fish belonging to the family Sciaenidae, the drums and croakers. This species is found in the northern Indian Ocean.
