= Buddha Jumps Over the Wall =

Chinese shark fin soup

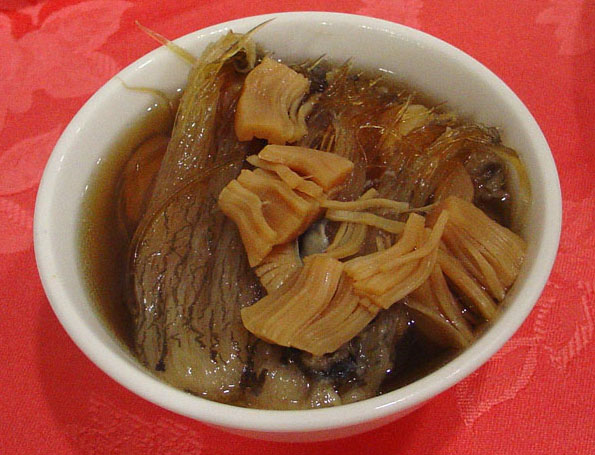
- Course: Main course
- Place of origin: Fuzhou
- Region or state: Fujian, China
- Main ingredients: Shark fin, quail eggs, bamboo shoots, scallops, sea cucumber, abalone, fish maw, chicken, Jinhua ham, pork tendon, ginseng, mushrooms and taro
- Variations: Shark fin soup

Buddha Jumps Over the Wall

Chinese name
- Traditional Chinese: 佛跳牆
- Simplified Chinese: 佛跳墙
Transcriptions
Standard Mandarin
- Hanyu Pinyin: fótiàoqiáng
- IPA: [fwǒ tʰjâʊ tɕʰjǎŋ]
Yue: Cantonese
- Jyutping: fat6 tiu3 coeng4
- IPA: [fɐt̚˨ tʰiw˧ tsʰœŋ˩]
Southern Min
- Hokkien POJ: hu̍t-thiàu-chhiûⁿ

Vietnamese name
- Vietnamese alphabet: Phật nhảy tường
- Chữ Nôm: 佛趂牆

Thai name
- Thai: พระกระโดดกำแพง

Korean name
- Hangul: 불도장
- Hanja: 佛跳牆
Transcriptions
- Revised Romanization: buldojang
- McCune–Reischauer: Pultochang

Japanese name
- Kanji: 佛跳牆
- Kana: ぶっちょうしょう
Transcriptions
- Romanization: Butchōshō

Buddha Jumps Over the Wall, also known as Buddha's Temptation or fotiaoqiang (Chinese: 佛跳墙; pinyin: fótiàoqiáng; Pe̍h-ōe-jī: hu̍t-thiàu-chhiûⁿ), is a Chinese recipe, a variety of shark fin soup in Fujian cuisine. This dish is known in Chinese cuisine for its rich taste and special manner of cooking. The dish's name is an allusion to the dish's ability to entice the vegetarian Buddhist monks from their temples to partake in the meat-based dish, and implies that even the strictly vegetarian Gautama Buddha would try to jump over a wall to sample it. It is high in protein and calcium. It is one of China's state banquet dishes.

Concerns over the sustainability and welfare of sharks limited its consumption and led to various modified versions without the usage of shark fin as ingredient.

== Ingredients ==
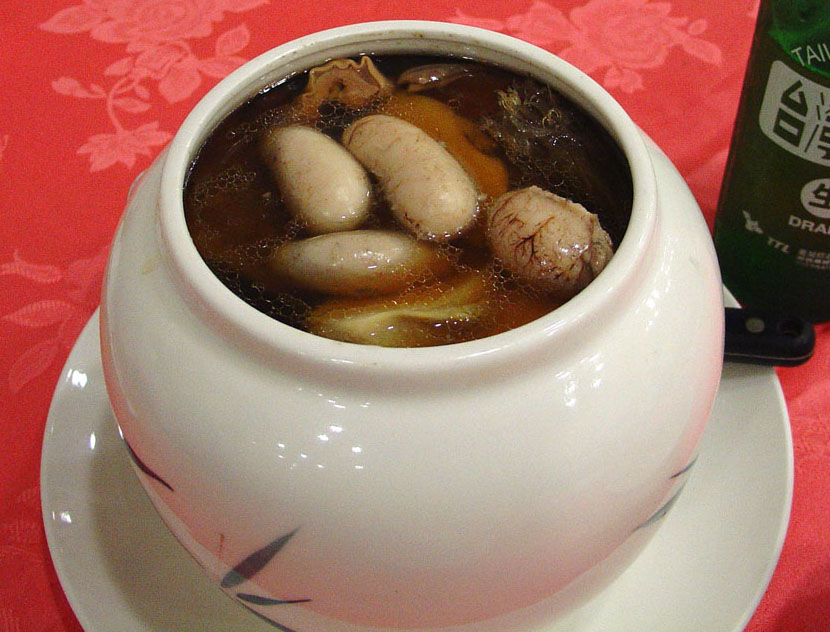
Buddha Jumps Over the Wall is often served in jars

The soup or stew consists of many ingredients, especially animal products, and requires one to two full days to prepare. A typical recipe requires many ingredients including quail eggs, bamboo shoots, scallops, sea cucumber, abalone, shark fin, fish maw, chicken, Jinhua ham, pork tendon, ginseng, mushrooms and taro. Huangjiu (yellow liquor) is also an important element in the soup. Some recipes require up to thirty main ingredients and twelve condiments.

Use of shark fin, which is sometimes harvested by shark finning, and abalone, which is implicated in destructive fishing practices, are controversial for both environmental and ethical reasons. Imitation shark fin and farmed abalone are available as alternatives.

== Origin ==
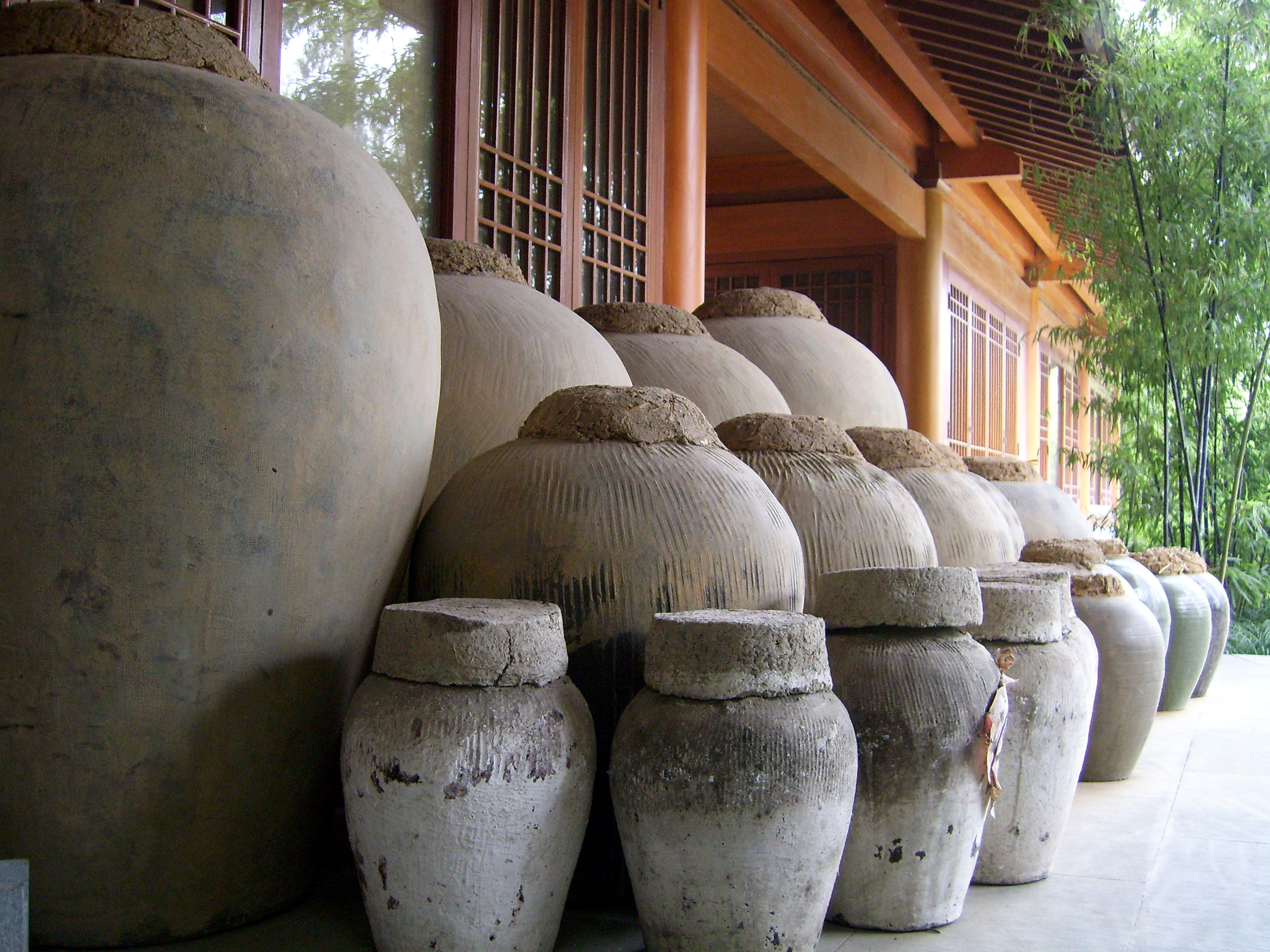
Traditional Chinese alcohol jars, likely the kind used in cooking Buddha Jumps Over the Wall

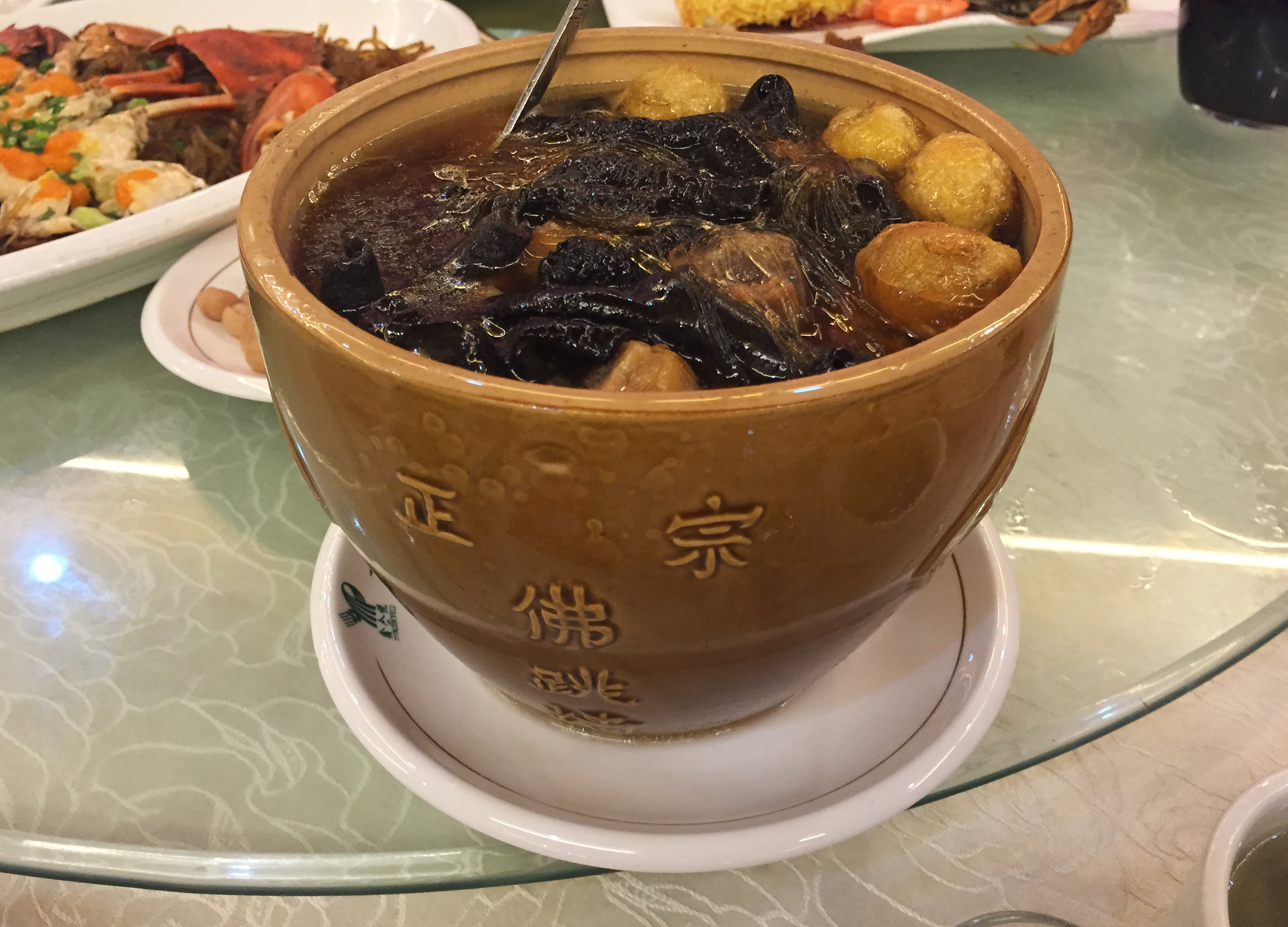
In Guangzhou, China

There are many different stories about the origin of the dish. A common one is about a scholar traveling on foot throughout Fujian. While he walked with his friends, the scholar preserved all his food for the journey in a clay jar used for holding wine. Whenever he had a meal, he warmed up the jar with the ingredients over an open fire. Once they arrived in Fuzhou, the capital of Fujian Province, the scholar started cooking the dish. The smells spread over to a nearby Buddhist monastery where monks were meditating. Although monks are not allowed to eat meat, one of the monks, tempted, jumped over the wall. A poet among the travelers said that even Buddha would jump the wall to eat the delicious dish.

Another origin is that the dish dates back to the Qing Dynasty. It is said to be a recipe that was created by a Fuzhou official who was trying to leave an impression on his superior Zhou Lian. He put pork, chicken, duck, and seafood altogether and left it to simmer in an empty wine jar, which followed the recipe at the time that was known as "Full of Blessing and Longevity." The official at the home praised the dish for its aroma and flavor. He was so impressed that he went home and asked his personal chef Zheng Chunfa to learn the recipe. The chef adapted the recipe and made it better, and later opened a restaurant to serve it to his customers. One of the customers wrote a poem on the dish, saying even Buddha would jump over the wall to have a taste, hence the name Buddha Jumps Over the Wall. Another possible origin is that the phrase "Buddha Jumps Over the Wall" appears in a book from the Song dynasty. Many stories existed regarding the origin of the dish name.

== Consumption outside Mainland China ==
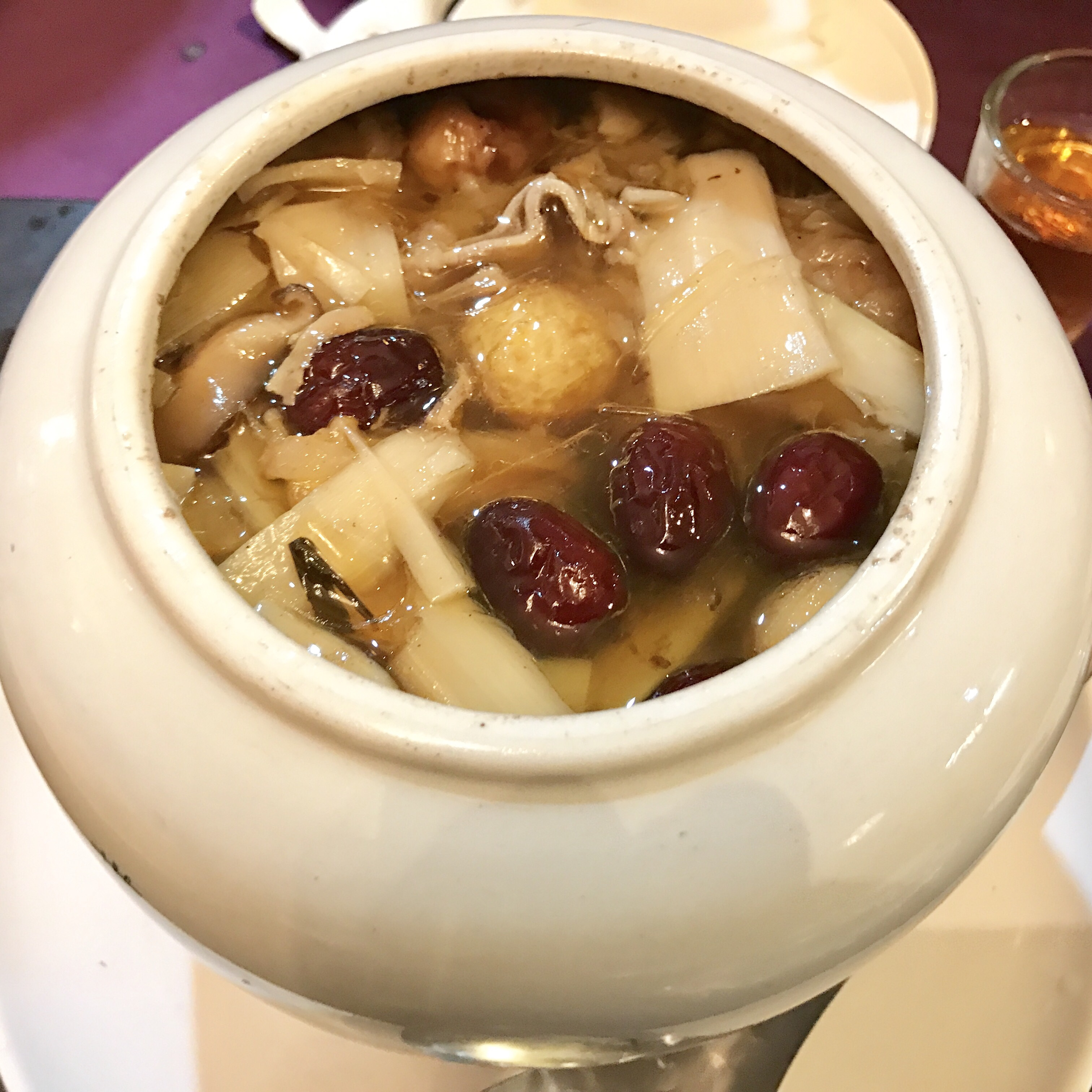
In Taipei, Taiwan

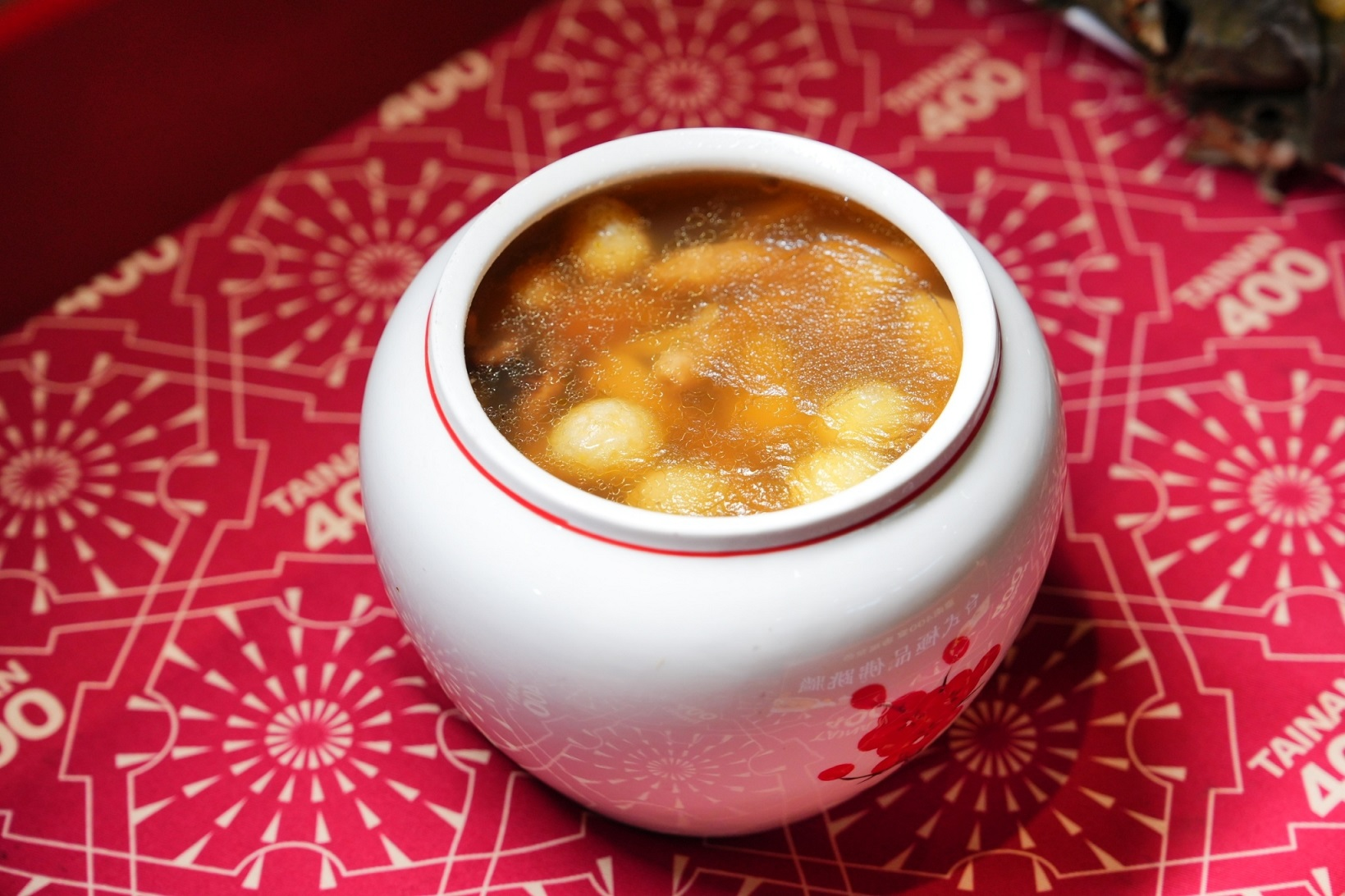
In Tainan, Taiwan

In South Korea, the dish is known as buldojang (the Korean reading of the same Chinese characters). It was first introduced in 1987 by Hu Deok-juk (侯德竹), an ethnic Chinese chef from Taiwan at the Chinese restaurant Palsun, located in the Shilla Hotel in Seoul. The dish played an important role in changing the mainstream of Chinese cuisine consumed in South Korea. However, in 1989, the Jogye Order, the representative order of traditional Korean Buddhism, strongly opposed the selling of the dish because the name is considered a blasphemy to Buddhism. Although buldojang temporarily disappeared, the dispute ignited the spreading of rumors among the public, and the dish consequently gained popularity. When President Moon Jae-in visited China, it was served at the state dinner.

Kai Mayfair in London was dubbed "home of the world's most expensive soup" when it unveiled its £108 version of Buddha Jumps Over the Wall in 2005. The dish includes shark's fin, Japanese flower mushroom, sea cucumber, dried scallops, chicken, Hunan ham, pork, and ginseng.

The dish has been served at many state banquets for decades, including those given in honor of the Cambodian King Sihanouk, US President Reagan, and UK Queen Elizabeth II.

== See also ==
- List of Chinese dishes
- List of Chinese soups
- List of soups
