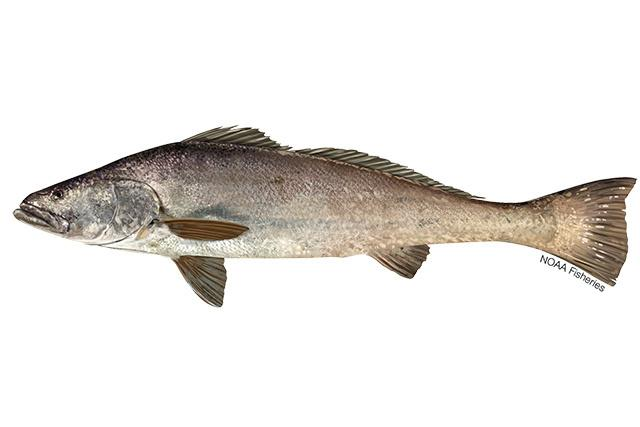

Conservation status
- Vulnerable (IUCN 3.1)
- CITES Appendix I

Scientific classification
- Kingdom: Animalia
- Phylum: Chordata
- Class: Actinopterygii
- Division: Teleostei
- Order: Acanthuriformes
- Family: Sciaenidae
- Genus: Totoaba; Villamar, 1980
- Species: T. macdonaldi

Binomial name
- Totoaba macdonaldi (Gilbert, 1890)
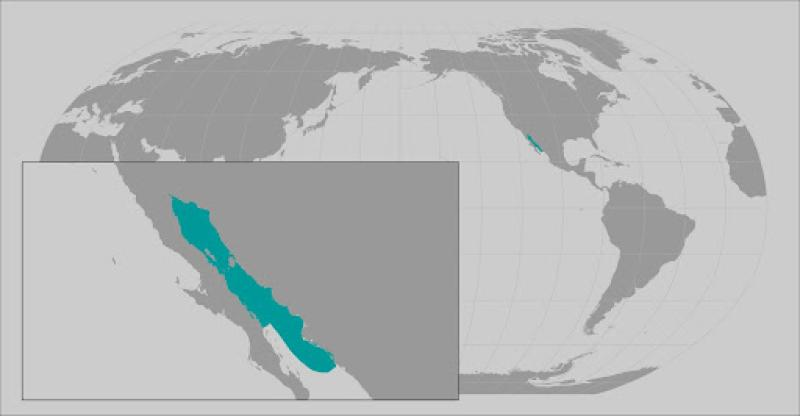

Synonyms
- Cynoscion macdonaldi Gilbert, 1890

= Totoaba =

Totoaba Temporal range: Early Miocene to present

Endangered species of fish

The totoaba or totuava (Totoaba macdonaldi) is a species of marine fish endemic to the Gulf of California in Mexico. It is the largest member of the drum family Sciaenidae and is the only extant species in the genus Totoaba. Originally an abundant species, the totoaba is now considered endangered due to human-related threats that contributed to its population decline.

== Distribution and habitat ==
Although the totoaba population has declined due to nearly 50 years of overfishing, they have maintained their historical distribution range across the Gulf of California, inhabiting the northern part of the Gulf, the south of La Paz, the west of Baja California Sur, and the east of Mármol, Sinaloa. Interestingly, the genus Totoaba appears to have had a slightly wider range on the western North American coast in prehistoric times; a fossil otolith assigned to the extinct species T. fitchi is known from the Oclese Sand Formation in Kern County, California, suggesting that it reached as far north as there during the late part of the Early Miocene.

New studies have indicated a possible expansion in range for the living totoaba population from their historical southern limit of west Bahía Concepción and east in the mouth of the El Fuerte River, Sinaloa to more southward bound areas such as in the Bay of La Paz and off Mármol. However, this range expansion is still being researched as there is a lack of information on the totoaba prior to its decline.

The totoaba use different habitat areas of the Gulf for their ontogenetic migratory pattern which consist of pre-recruits, juveniles, pre-adults, and adults. Each location provides different environments to sustain that specific life stage. However, their habitat has been altered due to the damming of the Colorado River specifically the upper Gulf which is their spawning and nursery area.

The totoaba habitats consists of either brackish or marine waters depending on their life stage. They mainly inhabit coastal areas, but have been found in rocky reef areas. Their water depth ranges from 1 to 70 meters, and temperature ranges from 15–29 °C (59–84 °F). The totoaba is a demersal fish, spending time at the bottom of soft, sandy coastal areas.

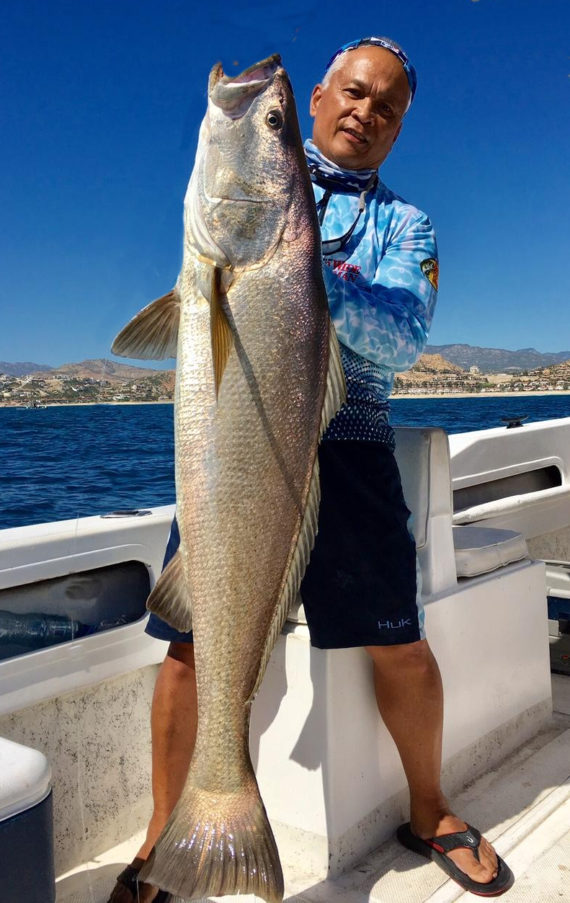
Totoaba caught off Point Palmill, Baja California Sur. October 2017. Catch courtesy of Jo Barcimo. Photograph courtesy of Eric Brictson, Gordo Banks Pangas, La Playita, Baja California Sur. Website https://mexican-fish.com/totoaba/

== Species description ==
While there is no formal compilation of the color, shape, or other characteristics besides size and weight of the totoaba, a website dedicated to the photography and species information of Mexican fishes has compiled a cohesive enough species description of the totoaba. The totoaba can reach a size of up to 2 metres (6.6 ft) and weight of 135 kilograms (298 lb). The totoaba coloration is silvery with darker fins and a light belly. There is no sexual dimorphism between the males or females. The juveniles tend to be spotted in comparison to the adults, specifically having a spotted second dorsal fin. The totoaba have an elongated compressed fusiform body shape with a terminal oblique mouth and lower jaw that projects slightly. The totoaba has two dorsal fins with a clear separation between them. The anterior dorsal fin is a spinous portion, and the posterior dorsal is a soft-rayed portion providing balance, maneuverability, and protection. Its pectoral fins are located towards the head of the fish right behind the operculum and are exceedingly long with the pelvic fins located right beneath it. Its anal fin is located before the peduncle and its caudal fin most closely resembles a truncate shaped tail.

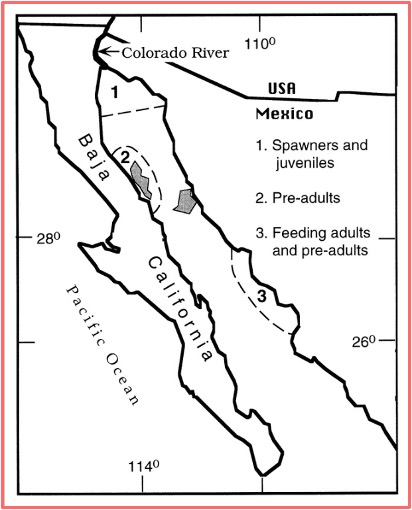
Different habitats at different life stages of the totoaba in the Gulf of California.

== Life cycle ==
The totoabas' weight and size makes it the largest species in the drum family, together with the similar-sized Chinese bahaba (Bahaba taipingensis) and meagre (Argyrosomus regius). The totoabas' diet consists of finned fish and crustaceans. A recent study done in 2023 has used metabarcoding for the first time to identify a more specific diet for wild totoaba. The study found 11 species of prey consumed by the totoaba: Pacific anchovy (Centengraulis mysticetus), flathead grey mullet (Mugil cephalus), bigeye croaker (Micropogonias megalops), northern anchovy (Engraulis mordox), ocean whitefish (Caulolatilus princeps), milkfish (Chanos chanos), and Pacific sardine (Sardinpos sagax). Crustaceans known as krill from the Euphausiidae family were also identified. This more in depth understanding of diet allows for a better understanding of dietary needs for aquaculture feed considerations, biodiversity, trophic relationships, and ecology. Discovering the diet of the totoaba has proven difficult because their diet varies depending on the life stage it is in. However, in juveniles examined in 1972, they found amphipods, crustaceans, and juvenile fishes (Micropogon sp., Mugil cephalus, and Leuresthes sardina) so although limited by size the diet if the juveniles is comparable to the diet of the adults.

Totoaba are long-lived and may live up to 20–25 years, but sexual maturity is usually not reached until females are seven years old and males are six years old. Female and male totoaba measured length during their first sexual maturity is between 1.3 and 1.2 metres (4 ft 3 in and 3 ft 11 in). The totoaba's population growth is slow, with a minimum population doubling time of 4.5 to 15 years. The totoaba spawn in the mouth of the Colorado River Delta, serving as a nursery of shallow, brackish waters for the young fish. The totoaba population is found in two distinct groups. Larval and juvenile stages occupying the Colorado delta, while the adult breeding population lives for most of the year in deeper water towards the middle of the Gulf of California. The breeding timeframe starts in January and continues til May with a peak in March and April. Totoaba are an iteroparous species with asynchronous ovarian dynamics suggesting they are batch spawners. One-year-old totoabas are metabolically most efficient in brackish water of about 20 parts per thousand (or ‰) salinity (about 20 g NaCl/L), a level that occurred naturally in the delta before the diversion of water from the Colorado River that occurred in the middle of the 20th century.

== Environmental threat ==
The diversion of water from the Colorado River within the United States leaves little or no fresh water to reach the river delta, greatly altering the environment in the delta, and the salinity of the upper Gulf of California. The flow of fresh water to the mouth of the Colorado since the completion of the Hoover and Glen Canyon dams has been only about 4% of the average flow during the period from 1910 to 1920. This is considered to be a major cause of the depletion of the totoaba population. Changes in salinity cause the response of physiological processes to change which can impact the survival of a population by affecting growth and reproduction. With the loss of the freshwater flow from the Colorado River, salinity in the delta is usually 35 ‰ (about 35 g NaCl/L) or higher; it ranges from > 1 psu (practical salinity unit) at the head of the Colorado River to 20 psu in the delta. While this alteration has been considered one of the reasons for totoaba population decline since historically the totoaba have been considered an estuarine-dependent species that use the Upper Gulf of California for spawning, new studies done in 2023 have indicated that the totoaba continue to use the modified breeding grounds. This suggest that either the totoaba are resilient and adaptable to changes occurring in their natural habitat or migrating to brackish waters served other purposes outside meeting breeding conditions. Regardless this does not mean reproduction success is not impacted but that reproductive activity by adults is not as negatively affected due to environmental changes caused from damming. Each life stage of the totoaba osmoregulate differently. Totoaba eggs are osmoconformers. Their larvae are stenohaline able to osmoregulate in salinity levels of 20 to 34 psu, this life stage is the less tolerant to extreme salinity. Juveniles, on the other hand, can survive in salinity ranging from 5 to 40 psu. The change in salinity in the habitat of juveniles has not affected their distribution or abundance.

== Human threats ==
Another threat to the totoaba is from human poaching: the swim bladder, commonly referred to as "maw" is a valuable commodity, as it is considered a delicacy in Chinese cuisine; the meat is also sought after for making soups. It can fetch high prices – 200 bladders may be sold for $3.6 million at 2013 prices – as it is erroneously believed by many Chinese to be a treatment for fertility, circulatory, and skin problems. The swim bladders are often smuggled to Hong Kong, where they are illegal, but import screenings are lax, and from there they are sometimes forwarded to mainland China, where import screenings are stricter. This trade once focused on the Chinese bahaba, but as its population became depleted, the trade shifted to the related totoaba. The totoaba swim bladder is often used for identification more than a morphological description of the fish due to the illegal trade of it. Recent research in 2024 has created a way to identify totoaba swim bladders on-site of legal and illegal trades, that is efficient, convenient, inexpensive, and gives reliable results called real-time fluorescence-based recombinase-aid amplification (RF-RAA). Helping authorities be equipped to handle the increase in illegal imports and the market regulations surrounding totoaba swim bladders.

The illegal totoaba fishery also threatens the vaquita, a critically endangered porpoise endemic to the northern Gulf of California that appears to be doomed to extinction unless the setting of gillnets in its habitat can be halted. Illegal totoaba gillnets also threaten sea lions, dolphins and turtles.

== Commercial trade ==
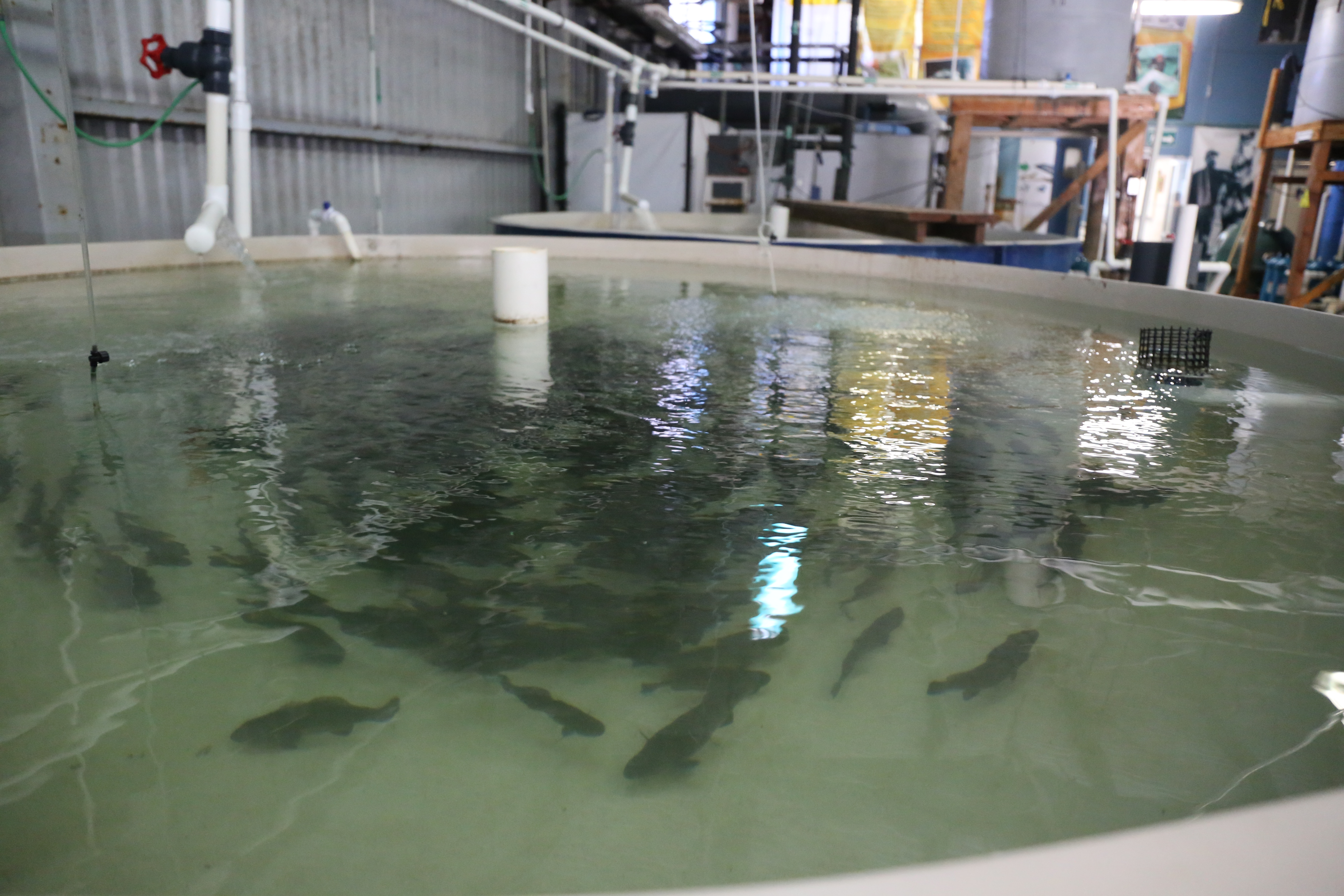
Totoaba at the Autonomous University of Baja California where much of the initial research in aquaculture of the species was done

Commercial fishing for totoaba began in the 1920s. The catch reached 2,000 t (2,200 short tons) in 1943, but had fallen to only 50 t (55 short tons) in 1975, when Mexico protected the totoaba and banned the fishery. Anecdotal evidence suggests that totoabas were very abundant prior to the start of the commercial fishery, but no hard evidence now indicates natural population size. Recent studies indicate that the totoaba population has stabilized at a low level, perhaps a bit larger than when the commercial fishery was banned in 1975. Totoabas are still caught as bycatch in fishing for other finned fish and for shrimp, and in illegal fishing for totoaba directly. Some totoabas are illegally exported to the United States, often misidentified as white seabass.

The government of Baja California has authorized commercial raising of totoaba in fish farms. Although now done at a relatively large scale by private fish farms, much of the initial research in the captive keeping, breeding and raising of totoaba was done at the Autonomous University of Baja California.

== Conservation status ==
Formerly abundant and subject to an intensive fishery, the totoaba has become rare, and was listed by the Convention on International Trade in Endangered Species of Wild Fauna and Flora under Appendix I in 1976. It is also listed by the International Union for Conservation of Nature as vulnerable, by NatureServe as critically imperiled and under the U.S. Endangered Species Act as endangered in 1979. Making it illegal to catch totoaba since 1975 when it was placed on the Mexican Endangered Species List.

On 16 April 2015, Enrique Peña Nieto, the President of Mexico, announced a program of rescue and conservation of the vaquita and the totoaba, including closures and financial support to fishermen in the area. This closure is necessary as they were still caught as a bycatch in the legal fishery for other species. Some commentators believe the measures fall short of what is needed to save the vaquita.

The Chinese trade in totoaba swim bladders has been a primary reason for its decline. Despite being illegal, this trade often happened quite openly and traders reported being warned before checks by Chinese authorities, allowing them to hide the swim bladders. More recently, both Mexican and Chinese authorities have tightened checks and performed raids, resulting in large confiscations and several arrests.

The totoaba is suitable for fish farming due to the relative ease of breeding it in captivity and its high growth rate. Although this mainly is done to supply the food market, tens of thousands of totoaba hatched in captivity have been released into the wild in an attempt to save the species.
