= Bahaba =

Scientific classification
- Kingdom: Animalia
- Phylum: Chordata
- Class: Actinopterygii
- Order: Acanthuriformes
- Family: Sciaenidae
- Genus: Bahaba; Herre, 1935

Type species
- Otolithes (Bahaba) lini Herre, 1935

Genus of fishes

Bahaba is a genus of marine ray-finned fishes belonging to the family Sciaenidae, the drums and croakers. These fishes are found in the Indo-West Pacific region.

== Taxonomy ==
Bahaba was first proposed as a monotypic subgenus of the genus Otolithes in 1935 by the American ichthyologist Albert William Herre with its type species being Otolithes (Bahaba) lini. In 1977 Ethelwynn Trewavas treated it as a valid genus in her paper called The sciaenid fishes (croakers or drums) of the Indo-West-Pacific published in the Transactions of the Zoological Society of London and most authorities now treat the genus as valid. Trewavas also stated that Herre's Otolithes lini was a junior synonym of Nibea taipingensis, which Herre had described in 1932. Bahaba belongs to the family Sciaenidae in the order Acanthuriformes. Some authorities place Bahaba in the subfamily Pseudosciaeninae but subfamilies are not recognised within Sciaenidae by Fishes of the World.

== Etymology ==
Bahaba is the word used in the Samal language of the Sulu region of Mindanao in the Philippines for drums and croakers.

== Species ==
The currently recognized species in this genus are:

- Bahaba chaptis F. Hamilton, 1822 (Chaptis bahaba)
- Bahaba taipingensis Herre, 1932 (Chinese bahaba)

== Characteristics ==
Bahaba is distinguished from other sciaenids by the form of their swim bladder which has unbranched horn-like or tube-like appendages which start at the anterior end of the swim bladder and are directed to the rear. The Chinese bahaba is the largest species, having a maximum published total length of 200 cm (79 in) while that of the chaptis bahaba is 50 cm (20 in).

== Distribution and habitat ==
Bahaba is found in the Indo-West Pacific with one species in the coastal Bay of Bengal, one endemic to the coastal waters of southern China
