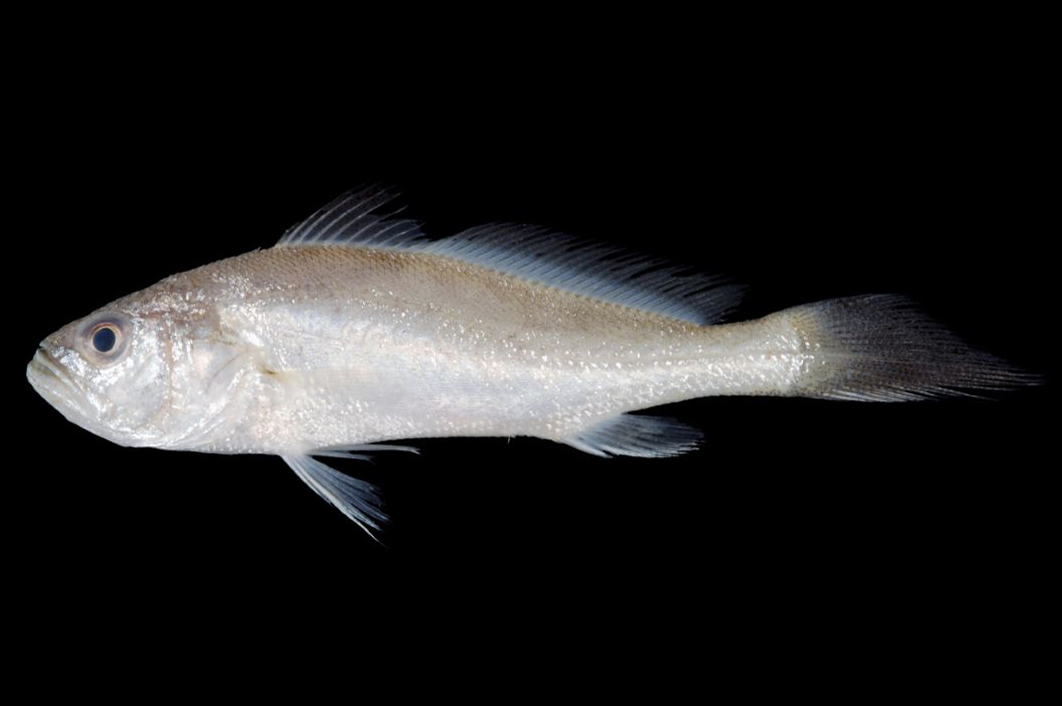
- Tigertooth croaker (Otolithes ruber)

Scientific classification
- Domain: Eukaryota
- Kingdom: Animalia
- Phylum: Chordata
- Class: Actinopterygii
- Order: Acanthuriformes
- Family: Sciaenidae
- Genus: Otolithes; Oken, 1817

Type species
- Johnius ruber Bloch & Schneider, 1801

Species
- see text

= Otolithes =

Small genus of marine ray-finned fishes

Otolithes is a small genus of marine ray-finned fishes belonging to the family Sciaenidae, the drums and croakers. The three recognised species in the genus are found in the Indo-West Pacific region.

== Taxonomy ==
Otolithes was first proposed as a genus in 1817 by the German naturalist Lorenz Oken. Its only species was Johnius ruber, which had been described by Marcus Elieser Bloch and Johann Gottlob Theaenus Schneider in 1801 from the "Indian Ocean". J. ruber was subsequently designated as the type species of the genus in 1861 by Theodore Gill. Workers have recognised that there were more than two taxonomic units, or lineages, within Otolithes and that these may represent previously unrecognised cryptic species and in 2019 O. arabicus from the Persian Gulf was described as a third species in the genus, distinct from O. ruber and there may be a fourth, as yet undescribed, species in the western Indian Ocean which is found from South Africa to Gujarat. This genus has been placed in the subfamily Otolithinae by some workers, but the 5th edition of Fishes of the World does not recognise subfamilies within the Sciaenidae, which it places in the order Acanthuriformes.

== Etymology ==
Otolithes was proposed as the genus name in 1817 by Oken based on Georges Cuvier's les otolithes of 1816. Cuvier explained in 1830 that this was based on the peche-pierre, a name meaning "peach stone" which was used by French and Portuguese colonial settlers in Pondicherry and refers to the large otoliths of Johnius ruber.

== Species ==
Otolithes contains three described, recognised species:

- Otolithes arabicus Y.-J. Lin, Qurban, K. N. Shen and Chao, 2019 (Arabian tigertooth croaker)
- Otolithes cuvieri Trewavas, 1974 (Lesser tigertooth croaker)
- Otolithes ruber (Bloch & Schneider, 1801) (Tigertooth croaker)

== Characteritics ==
Otolithes tigertooth croakers have rather slim, elongate bodies in which the length of the head is slightly greater than the depth of the body. They have a large upwardly pointing mouth with a protruding lower jaw. There are no pores on the snout and there are one or two pairs of large canine-like teeth in the front of either the upper jaw or both jaws. The head and anterior portion of the body are covered in cycloid scales. The swim bladder is shaped like a carrot and the forward branches do not extend into the head. The largest species is O. ruber which has a maximum published total length of 90 cm (35 in).

== Distribution and habitat ==
Otolithes tigertooth croakers are found in the Indian and Western Pacific Oceans from South Africa east to Australia. They are found in inshore and coastal waters.
