= Chinese bahaba =

Conservation status
- Critically Endangered (IUCN 3.1)

Scientific classification
- Kingdom: Animalia
- Phylum: Chordata
- Class: Actinopterygii
- Division: Teleostei
- Order: Acanthuriformes
- Family: Sciaenidae
- Genus: Bahaba
- Species: B. taipingensis

Binomial name
- Bahaba taipingensis (Herre, 1932)

Synonyms
- Nibea taipingensis Herre, 1932; Otolithes lini Herre, 1935; Nibea flavolabiata Lin, 1935; Bahaba flavolabiata (Lin, 1935)

Species of fish

The Chinese bahaba (Bahaba taipingensis), also known as the giant yellow croaker, is a critically endangered marine and brackish-water fish in the family Sciaenidae. It reaches lengths of up to 2 m (6 ft 7 in) and weights of 100 kg (220 lb). It occurs along the coast of China, from the Yangtze River estuary southwards to the Pearl River estuary, including the waters of Hong Kong and Macau. Its natural habitats include shallow seas, subtidal aquatic beds, rocky shores and estuarine waters.

== Distribution and habitat ==
The Chinese bahaba is known from coastal waters of China, from the Yangtze River estuary and Zhoushan Island southward through the Min River and Pearl River estuaries to Hong Kong and Macau. It inhabits shallow seas, subtidal aquatic beds, rocky shores and estuarine waters.

== Biology ==
The Chinese bahaba is a benthopelagic fish that feeds mostly on crustaceans, including shrimp and crabs. It enters estuaries to spawn and was historically seasonally abundant in these habitats.

== Genomics ==
A chromosome-level genome assembly of Bahaba taipingensis was published in 2026. The assembly spans approximately 686.9 Mb across 24 chromosomes, has a BUSCO completeness of 96.5%, and contains 22,100 predicted protein-coding genes.

== Conservation ==
Annual catches reached 50 tonnes in the 1930s but had fallen to about 10 tonnes per year by the 1950s and 1960s, when few large individuals were caught. The Chinese bahaba is listed as critically endangered by the International Union for Conservation of Nature. Its decline has been attributed primarily to overfishing, while degradation of its estuarine spawning habitats may also have contributed.

Since 2021, the species has been listed as a Class I nationally protected wild animal in China. Fishing pressure is driven largely by the high value placed on its swim bladder, which is used in traditional Chinese medicine. Earlier reports documented newly caught individuals being sold for very high prices.

Part of the Pearl River estuary has been protected by the Chinese government since 2005 as a conservation measure for the species. The 2020 IUCN assessment reported that the Chinese bahaba lacked legal protection in Hong Kong. The World Wide Fund for Nature and fisheries scientists at the University of Hong Kong have recommended that the local government protect the species. As the Chinese bahaba population declined, some of the trade in valuable swim bladders shifted to the closely related totoaba (Totoaba macdonaldi) of Mexico, which is also critically endangered.

== See also ==
- List of endangered and protected species of China
