= Relative fluorescence units =

Measurement in electrophoresis methods

The terms relative fluorescence units (RFU) and RFU peak refer to measurements in electrophoresis methods, such as for DNA analysis. A relative fluorescence unit is a unit of measurement used in analysis which employs fluorescence detection. Fluorescence is detected using a charge-coupled device (CCD) array, when the labeled fragments, which are separated within a capillary by using electrophoresis, are energized by laser light and travel across the detection window. A computer program measures the results, determining the quantity or size of the fragments, at each data point, from the level of fluorescence intensity. Samples which contain higher quantities of amplified DNA will have higher corresponding RFU values.

An RFU peak is a relative maximum point along a graph of the analyzed data. The data can be normalized to DNA input or additional normalizing genes. The RFU heights can range from 0 to several thousands.

== DNA PCR analysis ==
The RFU measurements are used, for DNA profiling, in a real-time polymerase chain reaction (PCR). Two common methods for detection of products in real-time PCR are: (1) non-specific fluorescent dyes that intercalate with any double-stranded DNA, and (2) sequence-specific DNA probes consisting of oligonucleotides that are labeled with a fluorescent reporter which permits detection only after hybridization of the probe with its complementary DNA target. Frequently, real-time PCR is combined with reverse transcription to quantify messenger RNA and Non-coding RNA in cells or tissues.

== RFU peak thresholds ==
The RFU peak height depends on the amount of DNA being analyzed. When the amount of DNA is very low, then it can be difficult to separate a true low-level RFU peak from signal noise or other technical artifacts. As a result, many forensic DNA laboratories have set minimum RFU peak-height levels in scoring the analysis of alleles.

There are no firm industry-wide rules for establishing minimum RFU threshold values. Each laboratory, in general, has established its own threshold levels as one aspect of its particular validation procedure. Many laboratories have established both lower and upper thresholds for data interpretation, as a window of minimum and maximum readings.

Some threshold levels can be derived experimentally based on the equipment's known signal-to-noise ratios, or a threshold can be defined to match published data or the manufacturer specifications. The company which sells the most widely used equipment for STR typing, Applied Biosystems, Inc. (ABI), has recommended a peak-height minimum of 150 RFU, advising how peaks below that level should be judged with caution. However, many forensic laboratories which have ABI systems have defined lower thresholds, often only 50 to 100 RFU, as determined by their own studies.

Many different factors can affect a laboratory's choice of thresholds. For instance, there might be regulatory guidelines in specific jurisdictions. Also, different kinds of instruments vary in sensitivity (such as slab gel instruments being less sensitive than capillary electrophoresis (CE) instruments). Individual instruments, of a particular model type, have also been known to differ in performance (e.g., differences among various ABI 310 units, all of the same model). Capillary electrophoresis instruments generally provide better resolution compared gel-based systems, as well having better sensitivity. In addition, some laboratories have set different threshold standards depending on which instruments in the lab are used for an analysis.

Setting an upper maximum threshold is critical when analyzing DNA data within high quantity samples. Samples with large amounts of amplified DNA will report high RFU levels that might oversaturate an instrument's sensitivity to measure the results. In such cases, an accurate measurement of the relative peak heights and/or areas might be unattainable. Oversaturation can be a problem when analyzing mixed samples.
