= Julie Andersen =

American shark conservationist

- Occupations: Shark conservationist and activist
- Years active: 2007-current
- Known for: Shark Angels

Julie Andersen is an activist and a founder of Shark Angels, a nonprofit organization focused on shark conservation.

== Biography ==
Andersen has been interested in ocean life since she was young; she started diving in 1995. For more than 14 years, she worked in advertising in Chicago and owned a successful marketing business that worked with clients such as Porsche and Citibank. In 2007, at a film screening in New York, she met director Rob Stewart. Within months, she sold her agency, her car, and her house and moved to South Africa to become a shark conservationist. The same year, she founded the non-profit Shark Angels and swam with Sea Shepherd Conservation Society Executive Director Kim McCoy and Save Our Seas Foundation Head Field Biologist Alison Kock to push back on the idea that sharks are vicious, maneating creatures. The foundation of Shark Angels was inspired by the horrors of the shark finning industry; since then, she has gone undercover in more than 20 countries to expose illegal shark fin trade. She has been featured on CNN, the Discovery Channel, Animal Planet, and NatGeo Wild.

In 2012, she was named a Sea Hero by Scuba Diving Magazine. In 2014, she and cinematographer Paul Wildman created the short documentary Black Swan, which features Andersen "dancing" with an oceanic white tip shark, considered one of the most dangerous species in the world. Andersen also founded the non-profits Shark Savers and, with Stewart, United Conservationists (UC). One of UC's movements in its early days was #FinFree, which aimed to educate the public about illegal finning. Stewart died in 2017 while filming the documentary Sharkwater Extinction. Andersen, diver Brock Cahill, and a team of others helped his parents finish and promote the film.

Andersen has also been a consultant for the Sea Shepherd Conservation Society, PEW, and WildAid. She is the Director of Global Marketing for Johnson Outdoors (SCUBAPRO and Subgear brands) and a member of the PADI Diving Society. As of 2018, Andersen is based in California.
