= Revolution (2012 film) =

2012 documentary film

- Directed by: Rob Stewart
- Produced by: Rob Stewart
- Narrated by: Rob Stewart
- Cinematography: Rob Stewart
- Music by: Jeff Rona
- Release dates: September 12, 2012 (Toronto International Film Festival); April 12, 2013 (Canada)
- Running time: 85 minutes
- Country: Canada
- Language: English

Revolution is a Canadian 2012 documentary film by Rob Stewart. It follows the filmmaker as he follows up on his earlier film, Sharkwater, and examines both looming environmental collapse and what people, especially young people, are doing to avert it. The film's world premiere was at the Toronto International Film Festival in the TIFF Docs section.

== Synopsis ==
While on assignment to photograph sharks in the Galapagos Islands, Stewart became aware of illegal longlining, indiscriminately killing sharks within the marine reserve. In an effort to promote awareness of the situation, he decided to make a movie to bring people closer to sharks, a four-year effort that resulted in Sharkwater.

Revolution begins with Stewart and an assistant in the water with sharks, and expands from there to saving the ecosystems we depend on for survival. Stewart travels to 15 countries, visiting such locations as the coral reefs of Papua New Guinea, deforested regions of Madagascar, and the Alberta tar sands. He comes to the realization that all of our actions are interconnected and that environmental degradation, species loss, ocean acidification, pollution, and scarcity of food and water are limiting, even reducing, the Earth's ability to support humans.

Traveling the globe to meet with the individuals and organizations working on a solution, Stewart finds encouragement and hope, variously pointing to the revolutions of the past and highlighting the current work of selected people. If people were informed about what was really going on, he argues, they would fight for their future, and the future of other generations. In time, he concentrates on the efforts of the young, as they have the most to lose: climate change and environmental collapse could take long enough that their elders may not be around to see the worst of what they have done.

== Release ==
After screening at the 2012 Toronto International Film Festival, the movie was released on April 12, 2013. United Conservationists planned a campaign to dovetail with the release.
