= Shark sanctuary =

Area that forbids the commercial fishing of sharks

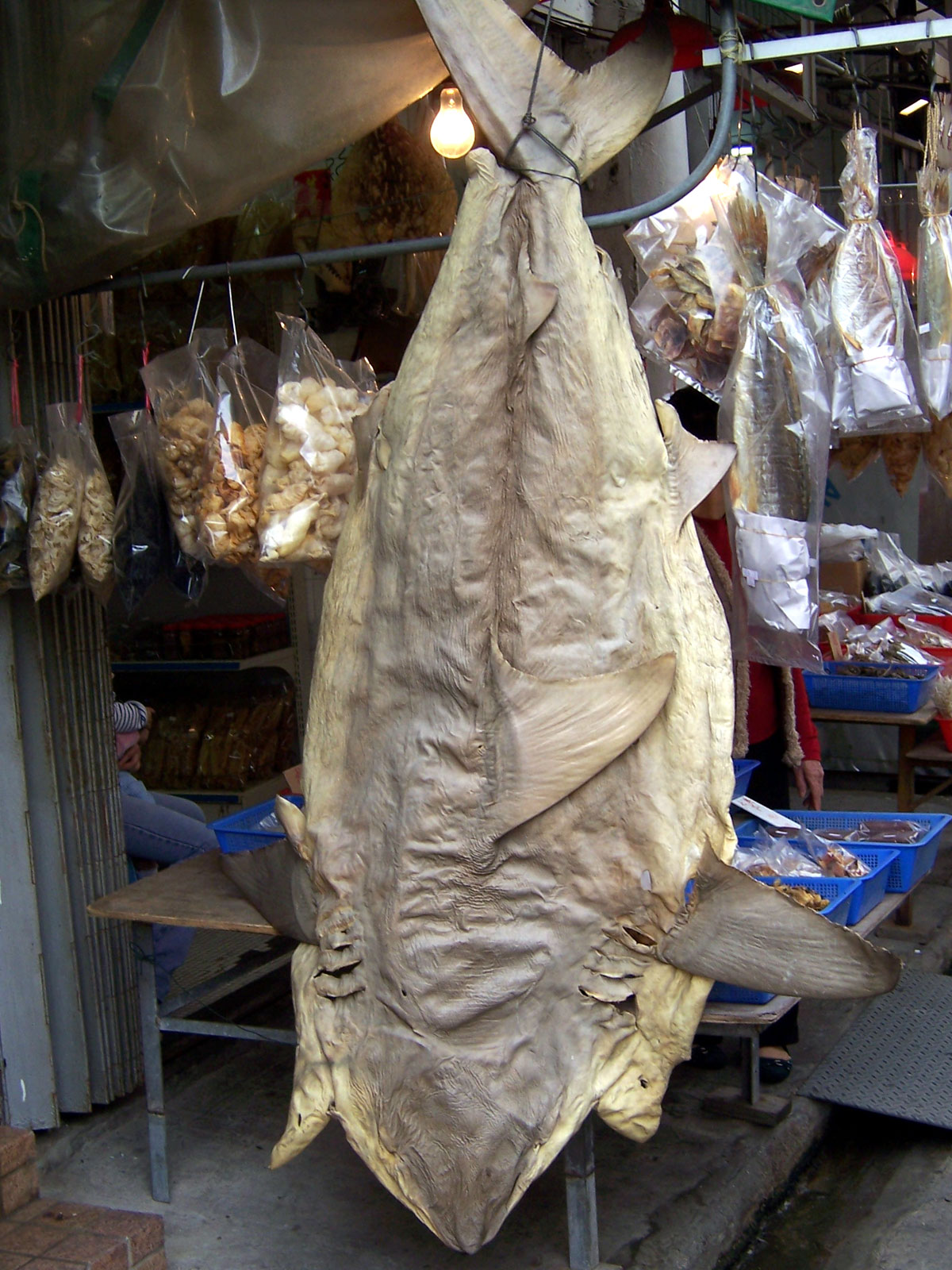
Dried shark skin and fins for sale in market

A shark sanctuary is an area that forbids commercial fishing operations from targeting and retaining caught sharks, including their fins. The first shark sanctuary was created by Palau in 2009. It was followed by Maldives, Honduras, The Bahamas and Tokelau.

== Background ==
Every year, fishermen pull "up to 73 million" or "some 100 million" sharks from the world's oceans. The United Nations Food and Agriculture Organization (FAO) estimates that more than half of shark species are overexploited or depleted. Globally, 21% of shark species whose extinction risk has been assessed fall into the "threatened" categories, and 18% are "near threatened", while 35% lack sufficient data to decide, leaving 26% in the unthreatened category.

The search for shark fins drives the illegal hunting trade. Some jurisdictions permit fishing for fins and food. Sharks are also caught as bycatch when fishing for marlin, tuna and other varieties.

Sharks generally reach sexual maturity only after several years of life and produce very few offspring in comparison to other harvested fish. Harvesting sharks before they reproduce has severe impacts on future populations.

== National and international status ==
Many nations restrict shark catches and shark finning.

=== Pacific Islands ===
Palau created the world's first so-named "shark sanctuary" on September 25, 2009. Palau forbids all commercial shark fishing within its Exclusive Economic Zone (EEZ) waters. The sanctuary protects about 600,000 square kilometres (230,000 sq mi) of ocean, an area similar to the country of France. President Johnson Toribiong made the announcement at a meeting of the United Nations. President Toribiong also requested a worldwide ban on shark fishing. Palau is home to 135 endangered or vulnerable shark and ray species.

The Maldives created a sanctuary in March, 2010. Tokelau declared its entire EEZ a shark sanctuary in 2011.

On February 25, 2011, Guam, a US island territory, voted to ban commerce in fins. Guam's Senate passed a bill banning the sale, possession and distribution of the fins.

In August, 2011, Micronesia, the Marshall Islands, and Guam announced plans to join Palau in a region-wide sanctuary that covers 2,000,000 square miles (5,200,000 km^{2}) of ocean.

Kiribati, another Pacific island state, and the US operate Earth's largest marine reserve.

=== Americas ===
Honduras prohibited the taking of sharks in its national waters as of February 2010.

The U.S. bans shark finning on all U.S.-flagged vessels, forbids the taking 19 species of sharks including white, whale, and basking sharks and shares lists of illegal vessels with established fishing companies, helping them report illegal activities. The U.S. also assesses the health of many of its shark populations and includes sharks in its various Fishery Management Plans. Hawaii has banned the sale and possession of shark fins. The states of California, Oregon and Washington are considering similar bans.

=== Africa ===
In 1991 South Africa became the first country in the world to declare great white sharks a legally protected species.

=== Europe ===
In February 2009, the European Commission proposed first-ever shark conservation rules for European waters, although these are not outright bans. EU countries account for one-third of global shark meat exports.

Shark steaks are increasingly served in restaurants. Shark parts are also used in lotions and leather sports shoes.

=== Asia ===
Taiwan banned shark finning in 2012.

Israel - All elasmobranchs are fully protected in Israel's territorial waters, in the Mediterranean Sea and in the Gulf of Aqaba (northeastern Red Sea), since 2005, making these effective shark sanctuaries.

== Shark fishery ==
The annual shark catch has increased rapidly over the last 50 years.

After reaching about 0.9 million tonnes in 2003, catches of the “sharks, rays and chimaeras” group declined to 0.75 million tonnes in 2006, a drop of 15 percent., numbering some 100 million fish.

Country	Capture (2000)
Indonesia	112,000
Spain	77,300
India	72,100
Pakistan	51,200
Taiwan	45,900
Mexico	35,300
Japan	33,100
USA	30,900
Sri Lanka	28,000
Argentina	25,700
Malaysia	24,500
France	22,800
Brazil	18,500
New Zealand	17,700
Great Britain	17,400
Thailand	16,200
Peru	15,400
South Korea	15,400
Maldives	13,500
Canada	13,500
Nigeria	13,200
Senegal	10,800
Portugal	9,100
Australia	8,100
Total	828,400

== Drivers of the shark trade ==
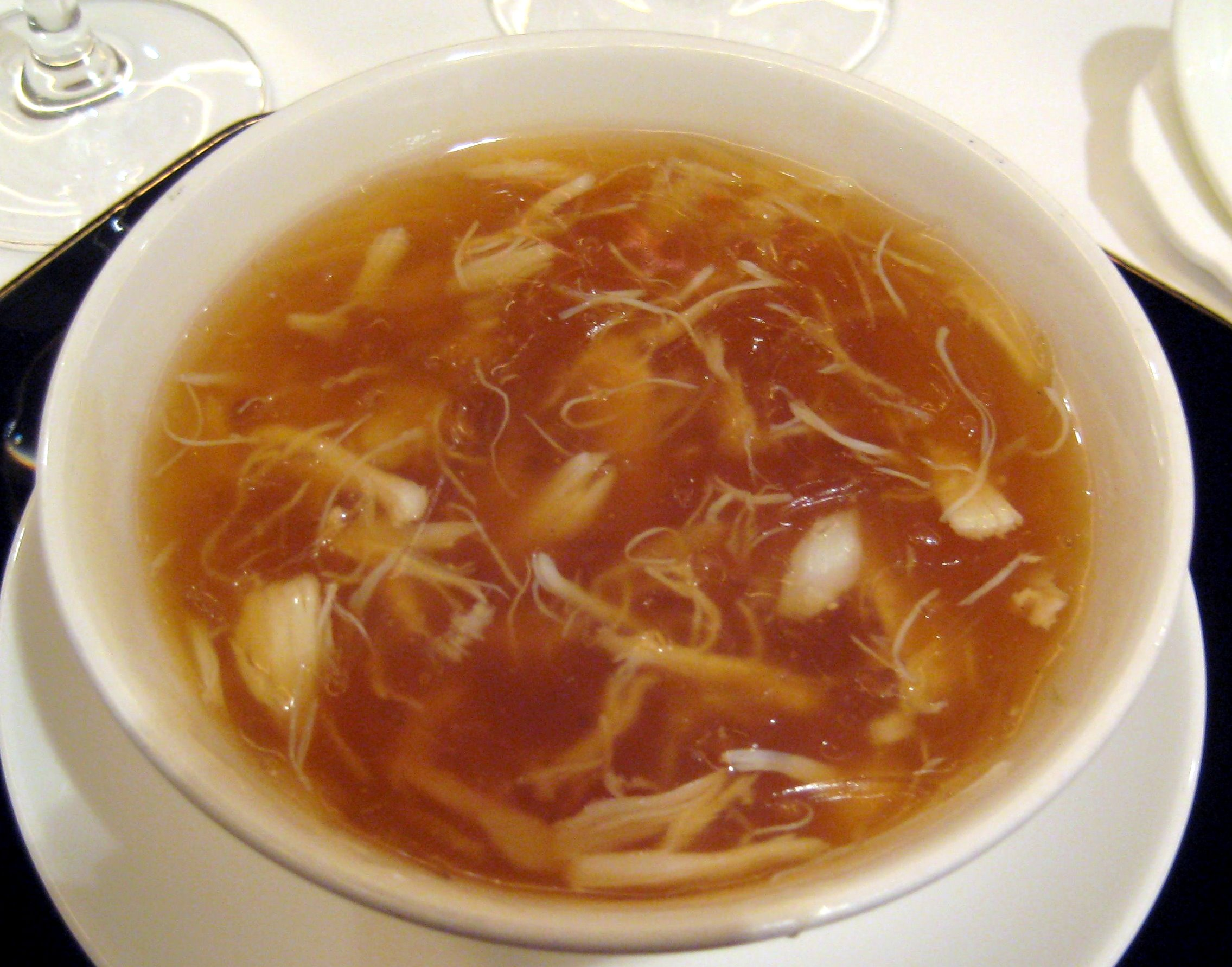
Shark fin soup

Sharks are a common seafood in many places around the world, including China (shark-fin soup), Japan, Australia (fish and chips under the name flake), in India (under the name sora in Tamil language and Telugu language), and Icelanders eat Greenland sharks as hákarl.

The practice of live finning, where a fisherman removes the fin with a hot metal blade and releases the dying animal occurs with some frequency, but is not a prevalent practice, with most fins taken with the entire animal. Around 80% of shark fins are derived as accidental by-catch, which are quickly sold to the market due to their high price. Shark finning has become a major trade within black markets all over the world with shark fins going at about $300/lb in 2009.

European consumers consume dogfishes, smoothhounds, catsharks, makos, porbeagle and also skates and rays. However, the U.S. FDA recommends that children and women who are or may be pregnant should refrain from eating shark. For details see mercury in fish.

In the East Asian region, use of shark cartilage in preparing soups is considered a health tonic. Hong Kong imports it from North and South American countries, particularly for use in either a cooked format or to prepare boiled soup, as a health fad, by mixing it with herbals supplements.

Another large demand for shark cartilage is for manufacture of "Shark Cartilage Powder" or pills as a cure for cancer. The anti cancer claims of such powders marketed in many parts of the world has been discounted by the US Food and Drug Administration, Federal Trade Commissions and medical studies. In spite of such injunctions, the trade in this powder continues and the shark cartilage powder is still widely marketed as a cancer cure, stated to be selling at US$145 per gram. It is also stated that in Costa Rica, one single firm alone processed 235,000 sharks every month to manufacture cartilage pills.

Seafood Watch recommends that everyone avoid eating shark.

The majority of shark fisheries around the globe have little monitoring or management. With the rise in demand for shark products there is a greater pressure on fisheries. Sharks experience a long interval between birth and sexual maturity, such that many sharks never reach maturity. In some species, populations have declined by over 90% over the past 20–30 years with decline of 70% not unusual.

The practice of shark finning, attracts much controversy and regulations are being enacted to prevent it from occurring. The acclaimed 2007 documentary, Sharkwater exposed how sharks are being hunted to extinction, in part due to the massive Asian demand for shark fin soup.

== See also ==
- Grey nurse shark conservation
- Shark Conservation Act
- Sharkwater
