= Shark fin trading in Costa Rica =

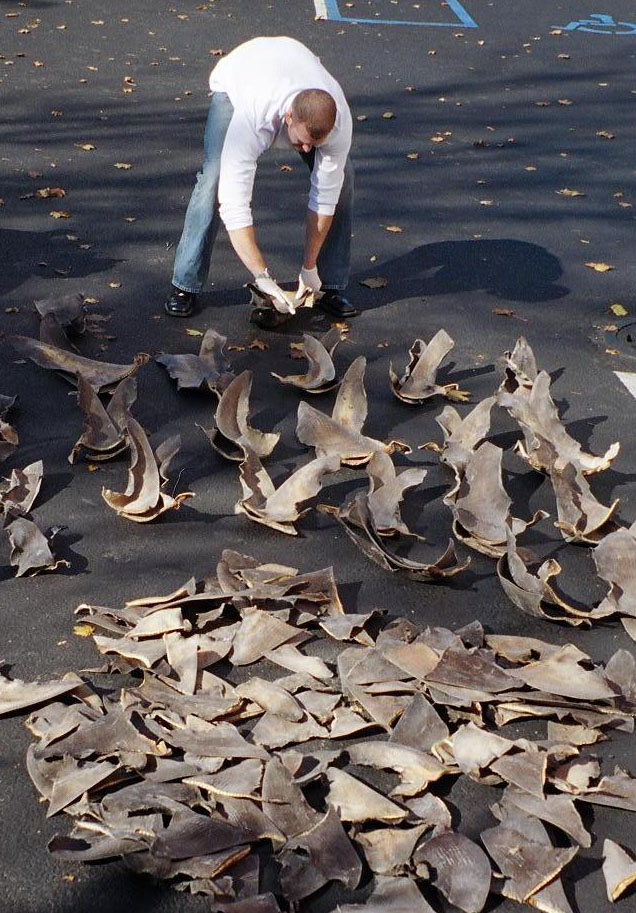
Confiscated shark fins

Shark fin trading in Costa Rica, or shark finning, is an illegal practice in the country. It poses a serious threat to shark populations besides the organized crime involvement in the practice within Costa Rica. The trade in Costa Rica is vigorously controlled by the Taiwanese mafia because of the high value of shark fins in restaurants in the Pacific Rim countries such as Taiwan, Hong Kong and China where Shark fin soup can cost up to $100 a serving in top restaurants. Some 95% of shark fin trading activity in Costa Rica culminates in the docks of Puntarenas on the western coast, notably Inversiones Cruz Dock and Harezan Dock, which are often privately run by the Taiwanese. The industry in Costa Rica took off from the 1970s as a result of the growth in demand from the emerging wealthy Tiger economies of the Asia-Pacific for shark fin as a delicacy. By the 1990s, the shark fin industry in Costa Rica had become one of the world's most important in shark finning, especially as a major cargo-unloading point for international fleets because of tax laws and government corruption in cracking down on the trade.

However, there is environmental awareness of the consequences of fin trade exploitation which could result in shark extinction. Prompted by WildAid’s campaigns, in East Asia, high profile politicians and their kin, film personalities, industrial establishments and committed individuals took voluntary “No shark fin” pledge. In January 2011, British chef Gordon Ramsay spoke of how he and his TV crew were held at gunpoint and soaked with petrol when filming a documentary about the illegal trade in Costa Rica.

== Practice ==
In response to poor incomes and pressure, local fisherman are forced into harvesting shark fins, despite only getting about one dollar per pound on an average, less than a third of its total retail value. Corrupt politicians are silenced with a fee to ignore government regulations. The practice involves sharks being caught by a horizontal drag line with many baited hooks, known as longline fishing. According to biologist Jorge Ballestero of the Costa Rican Sea Turtle Restoration Project (Pretoma), “Costa Rica has become intricately linked to this trade for two reasons: It has the biggest longliner fleet in the hemisphere, and it allows international vessels dedicated to the exploitation and trade of shark fins to land here.”

The Taiwanese mafia dominate the shark finning industry in Costa Rica, although Indonesian gangs also have a foothold in the market. The Taiwanese and Indonesian mafia operate private docks in the Puntarenas area, notably Inversiones Cruz Dock and Harezan Dock and several others where some 95% of all catches are brought in, transported by truck to San José and flown mostly to Hong Kong. According to the Costa Rican customs adviser Omar Jiminez, at least three boats full of shark fins enter the ports in Puntarenas every week. Kaohsiung in Taiwan is one of the biggest ports in the world for importing shark fins. They are brought in from overseas and are placed out to dry in the sun on residential rooftops near the port.

However, various shark cartilage industries in the country exist, depending on the import of cartilages from other countries. Costa Rica is mentioned as one such country where a leading processing plant is said to be purchasing raw cartilages from any source in the world to carry out semi or primary processing before exporting it, particularly to the USA. The USA then markets it worldwide in the processed shark cartilage powder form, under four or five brand names.

== History ==
In the 1970s, mass local and reef fishing off the Central America coasts had a profound effect on coastal shark populations throughout the Americas. FAO initiated action in 1999 to introduce a “Voluntary Plan of Action for sharks.”

In 1982, the National Learning Institute of Costa Rica received technical support and financing from the Taiwanese government to modernize its fishing fleet according to Pretoma. This had a major impact on the finning industry in Costa Rica, which subsequently took off in the 1980s (especially after 1986). Due to low shark populations on the coasts, the updated vessels could now venture further out to sea and use longline technology to greatly increase their catches. Meeting the increasing demand in the Tiger economies of the Pacific Rim countries for shark fins brought about their economic growth and increased wealth in the 1980s and 1990s. By the late 1990s, Costa Rica had become established as a major cargo-unloading point for international fleets and thus became a key component in the global finning industry.

In May 2003, a young Costa Rican Coast Guard official, Manuel Silva, reported the landing of a Taiwanese fishing vessel with 30 tons of shark fins on board. Not only were the Taiwanese vessels ignored by the four agencies charged with checking incoming cargos but the Costa Rican Fishing Institute (Incopesca) also failed to take action following his report.

In 2006/2007, Canadian director Rob Stewart went to Costa Rica and the Galapagos to shoot what he thought would be an innocent documentary after sharklife underwater in the film Sharkwater. However, shortly into filming, they stumbled across the Taiwanese mafia, the illegal shark fin trade and, feared for their lives when chased by gunboats. They managed to secretly capture footage of the traders in the film.

Today, Costa Rica is one of the world's most important participants in the shark-fin trade. Shark finning in Costa Rica was made illegal in 2012, signed into law by President Chinchilla. There is still a viable illegal market present.

== Demand ==
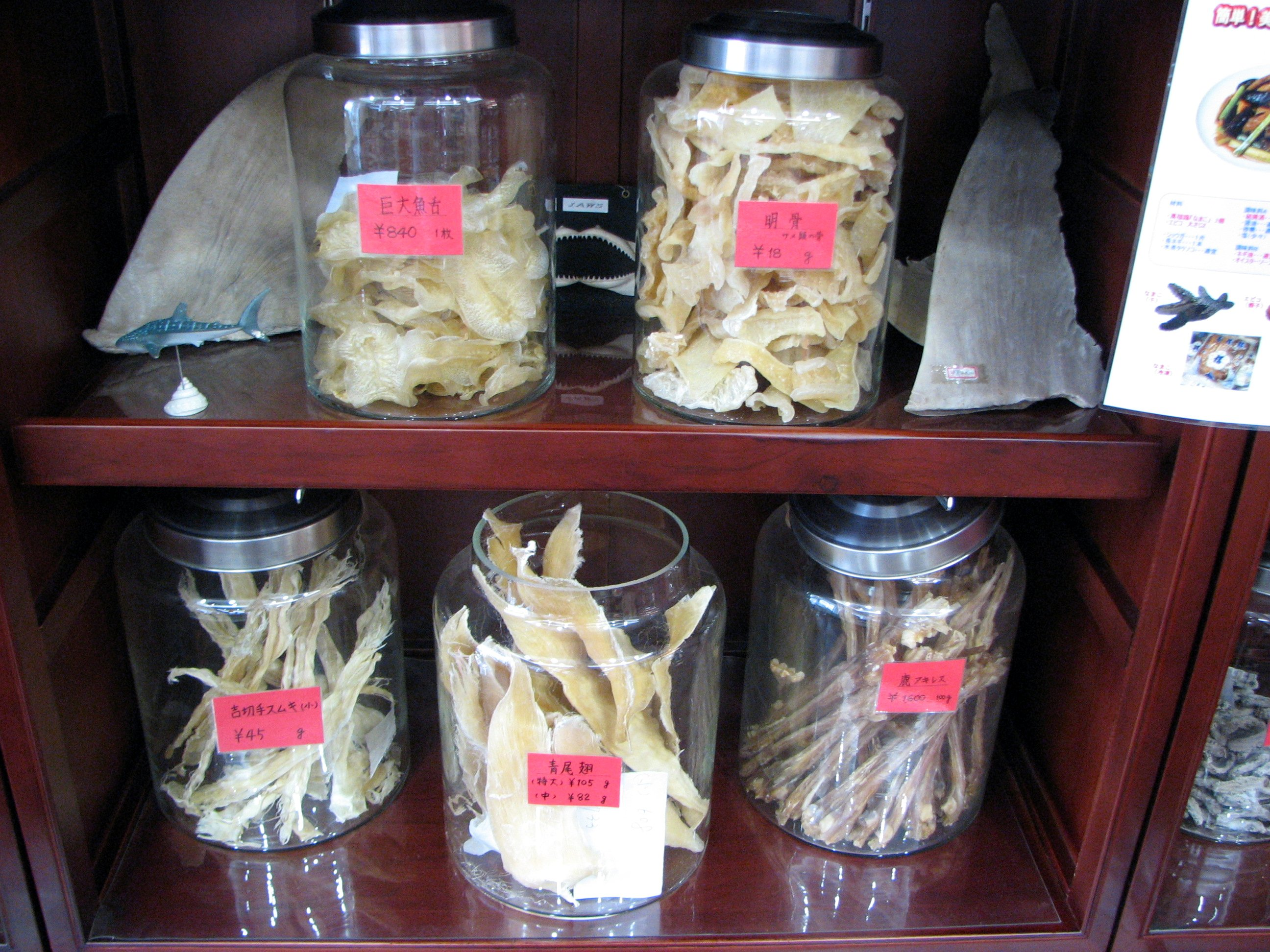
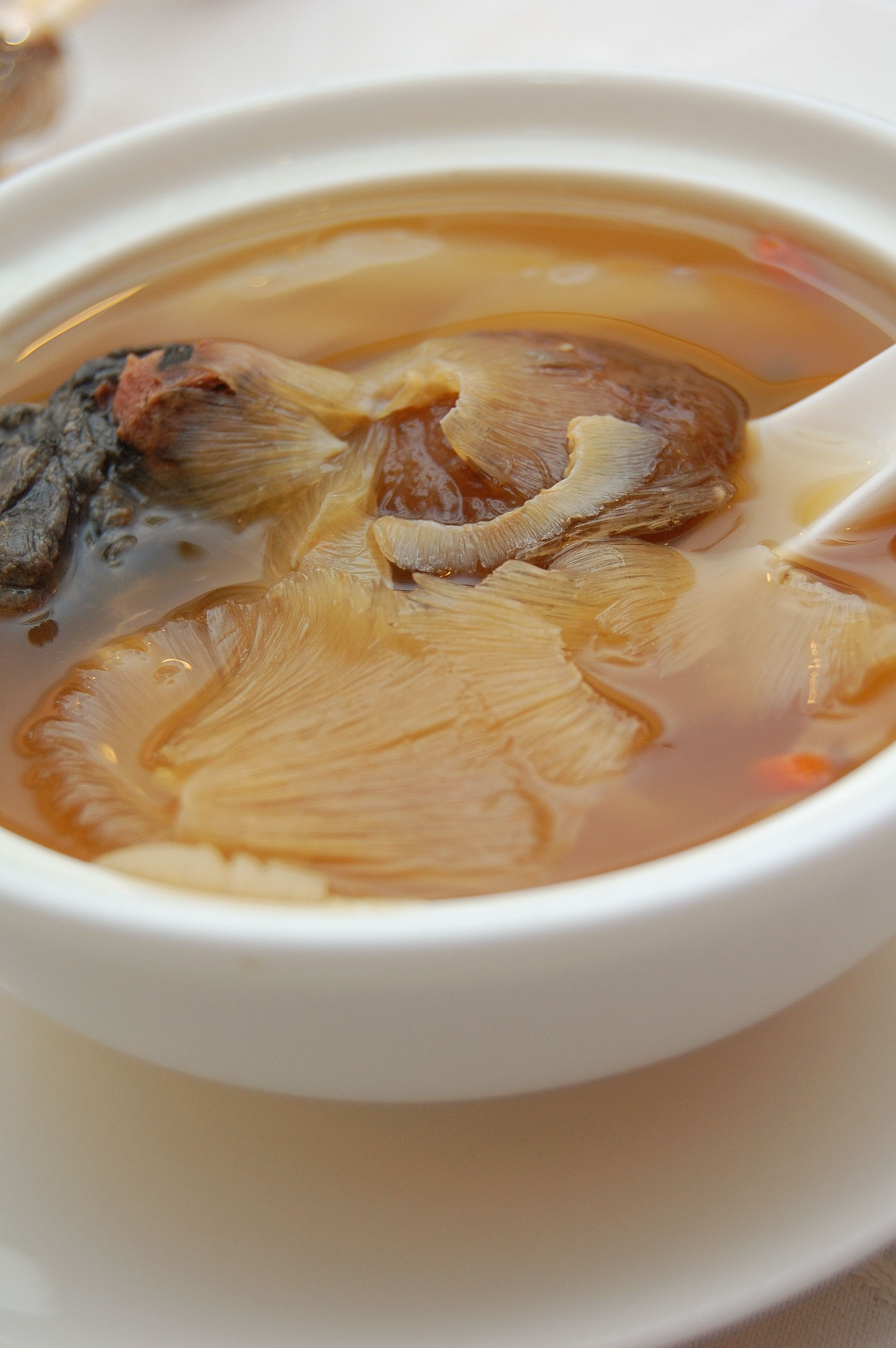
Left: Shark fin in a Japanese health store. Right: Shark fin soup

In Hong Kong restaurants, where the market has traditionally been strong, Shark fin soup can fetch up to $100 a serving in the top restaurants. However, the demand from Hong Kong natives has reportedly dropped, but this has been more than balanced by an increase in demand from mainland China, fueled by its growing economy and increased wealth, as the economic growth of China has put this expensive delicacy within the reach of a growing middle class. This increase in demand, combined with the importance of this top predator in the ocean, has the potential to significantly alter oceanic ecosystems. The high price of the soup means that it is often used as a way to impress guests or at celebrations. Shark fin is also incorrectly perceived by some as having high nutritional value, as well as cancer and osteoarthritis fighting abilities. Based on information gathered from the Hong Kong trade in fins, the market is estimated to be growing by 5% a year. In 1998, China imported a reported 4,240 tonnes of shark fins worth US$24.7 million, but Costa Rica competed with Japan, Spain, Singapore, Indonesia, Hong Kong, Vietnam, Norway, Ecuador, Peru and Fiji in providing for the Chinese market. In China, shark fins are increasingly being used in less extravagant items such as cakes, cookies, bread and even cat food.

In the South Asian region, use of shark cartilage in preparing soups is considered a health tonic. Hong Kong imports it from North and South American countries, particularly for use in either a cooked format or to prepare boiled soup, as a health fad, by mixing it with herbal supplements.

Another large demand for shark cartilage is for manufacture of "Shark Cartilage Powder" or pills as a cure for cancer. The anti cancer claims of such powders marketed in many parts of the world has been discounted by the US Food and Drug Administration and Federal Trade Commissions. In spite of such injunctions, the trade in this powder continues and the shark cartilage powder is still widely marketed as a cancer cure, stated to be selling at US$145 per gram. It is also stated that in Costa Rica, one single firm alone processed 235,000 sharks every month to manufacture cartilage pills.

== Environmental concerns ==
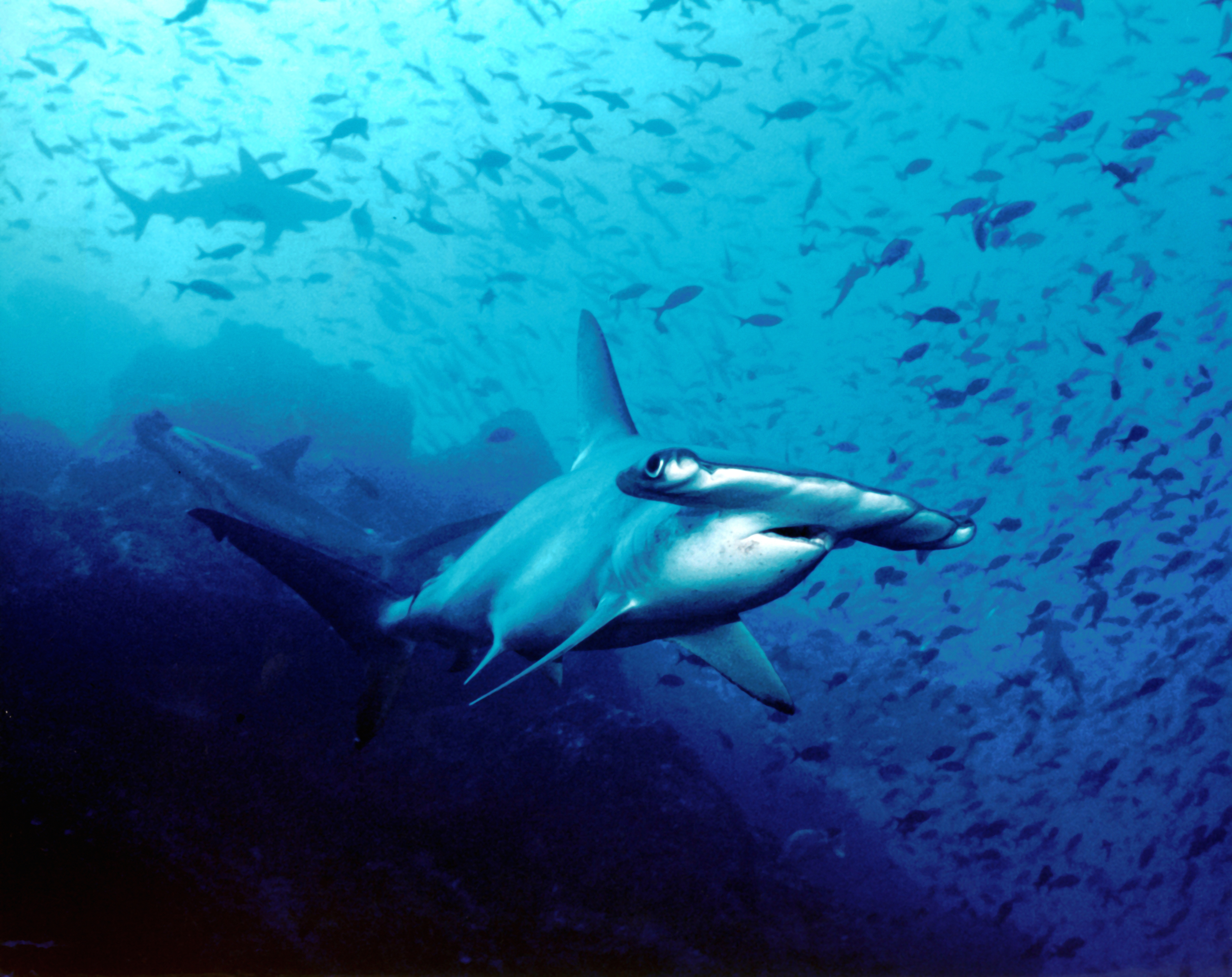
Hammerhead shark off Cocos Island, Costa Rica where illegal shark activities are difficult to deter because of limited manpower.

Since the late 1980s populations of northwest Atlantic coastal and oceanic shark have dropped by an average of 70%, and in 2003 the World Conservation Union (IUCN) estimated that tens of millions of sharks are finned and discarded at sea every year. However, estimates are muddy given the fact that the sharks and their fins cross-cut different fishing markets (not to mention that the vast majority of sharks are exploited in the Pacific coast of Costa Rica as opposed to the Atlantic coast). The major environmental problem facing Costa Rican waters by mass shark finning is that the fishermen involved in the practice of killing sharks for their fins pay no attention to the age, gender, size, or even the species of shark. Young sharks may be killed off, drastically affecting the ability to breed. A further biological complication is that sharks are naturally slow to breed and mature, which makes the possibility of extinction for many shark species in Costa Rican waters increasingly ominous.

As far back as 1999, FAO initiated action to introduce a “Voluntary Plan of Action for sharks.” The response, though not spontaneous, received support from 15 countries including Costa Rica. Even in the early 2000s, the fin trade market's influence on over exploitation of fins was realized, with many countries imposing ban on fishing of these species. Goaded by WildAid's campaigns in East Asia, high-profile politicians and their kin, film personalities, industrial establishments and committed individuals took voluntary “No shark fin” pledge and many personalities hosted banquets with “shark free” announcements. There is now constant publicity in the media in this regard in eastern Asia.

== Crackdown ==
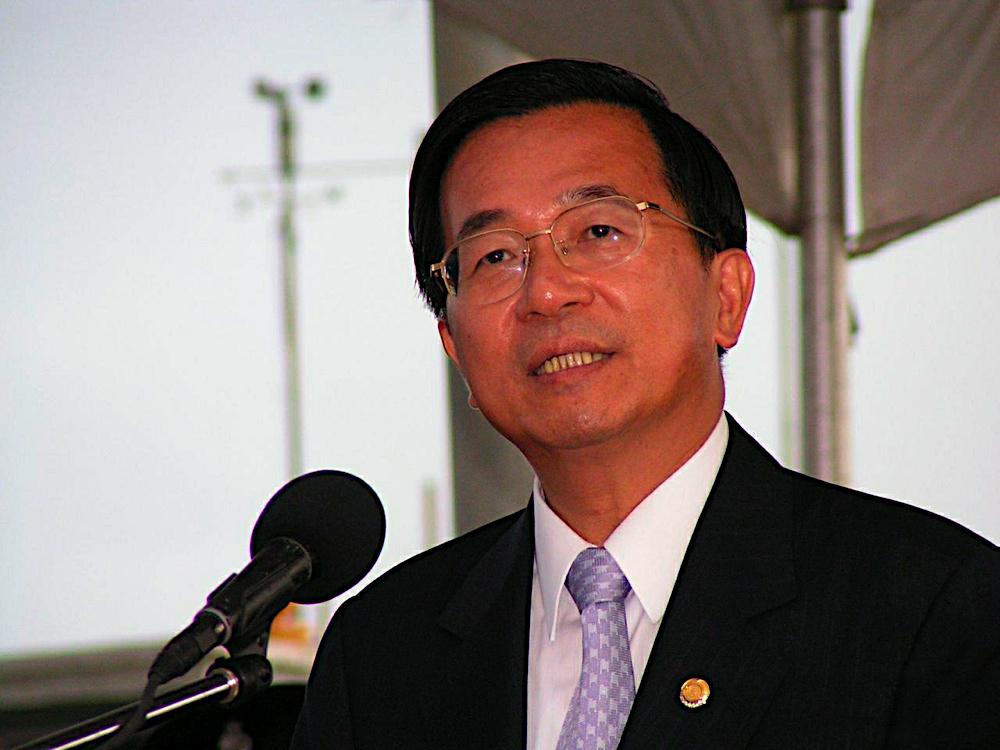
Chen Shui-Bian, together with Abel Pacheco, launched a crackdown on shark finning, with little success.

Former Costa Rican president Abel Pacheco, a noted environmentalist, and his Taiwanese counterpart, Chen Shui-Bian began a crackdown on shark finning in the early 2000s. However, enforcement is nearly impossible because of corrupt politicians and the terror created by the Taiwanese mafia preventing officials from making a stand against the trading. A reform bill has been proposed in Congress since the late 1990s in which a law would be passed entailing a prison term of up to two years for any perpetrator involved in the trafficking of fins that have been cut from sharks’ bodies before the catch has reached the dock. In this context, Pretoma has obtained a petition of over 20,000 signatures calling for the suspension of landing permits for foreign fishing vessels. Although the opposition to the trading is high and indeed illegal, effectively cracking down on the industry will be difficult as long as law enforcement and monitoring of fishing vessels is slack and corruption and poverty remain. The Taiwanese and Indonesian mafia even run their own private docks in Puntarenas which are known to the government and the Costa Rican police but incoming vessels are rarely inspected in a climate of fear. The port of Puntarenas, as of 2003, only had three inspectors allocated to the inspection of hundreds of vessels and generally only examines about 20% of them. As of 2003, no full-scale government investigation has been instituted into the port of Puntarenas, widely known to be the linch-pin of the illegal Costa Rican shark fin trading industry. In 2007, Costa Rica was again internationally criticized for its handling of sharkfinning.
