= Shark finning =

Illegal harvesting of fins from live sharks

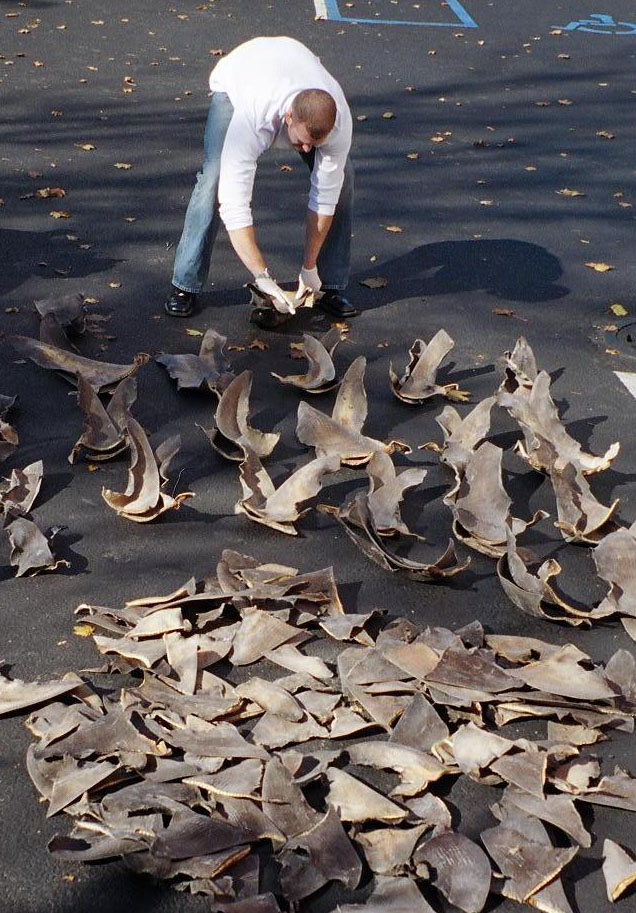
NOAA agent counting confiscated shark fins

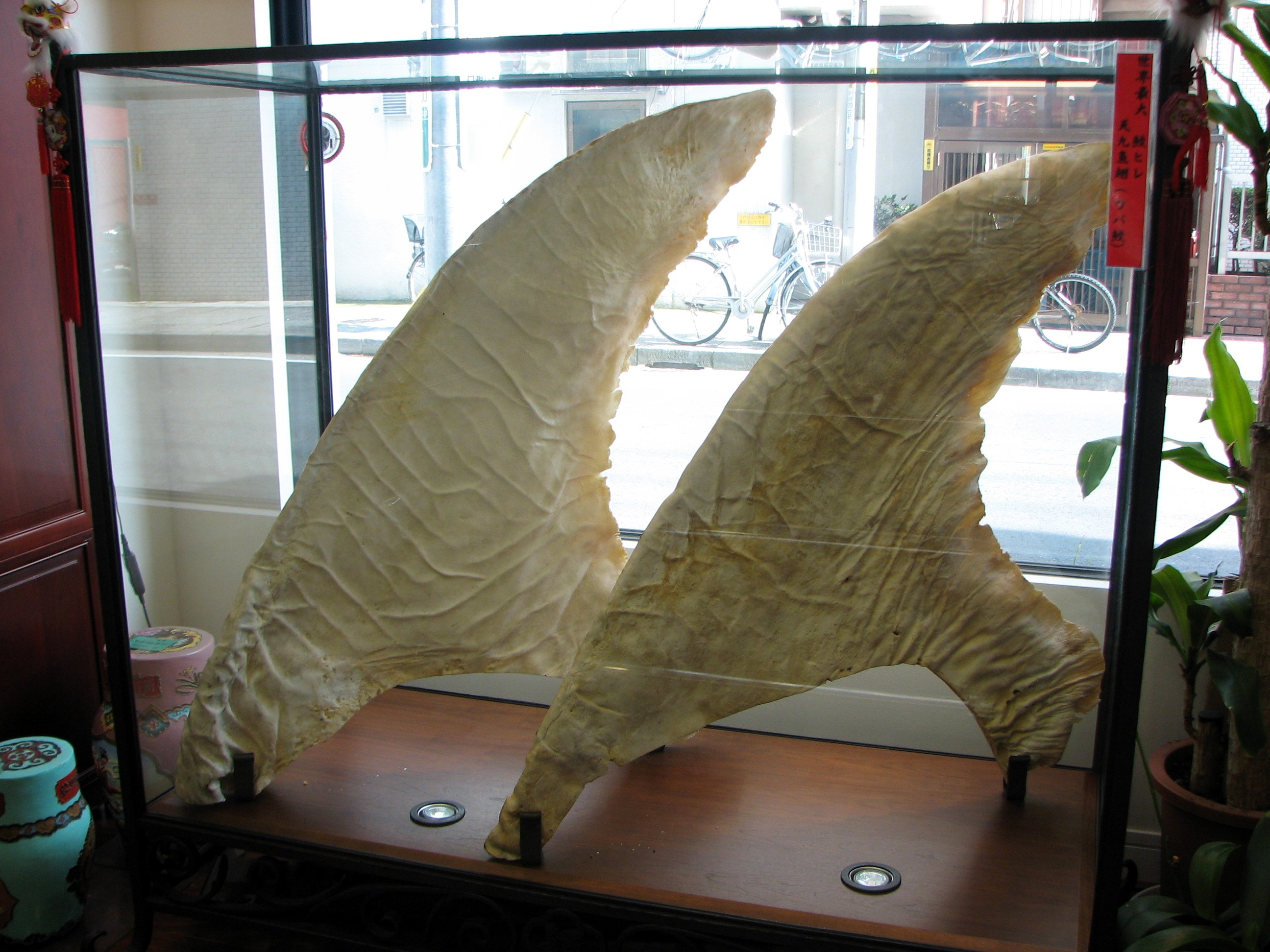
Shark fins on display in a Chinese medicine shop in Yokohama, Japan

Shark finning is the act of removing fins from sharks and discarding the rest of the shark back into the ocean. The sharks are often still alive when discarded, but without their fins. Unable to swim effectively, they sink to the bottom of the ocean and die of suffocation or are eaten by other predators. Shark finning at sea enables fishing vessels to increase profitability and increase the number of sharks harvested, as they must only store and transport the fins, by far the most profitable part of the shark; the shark meat is bulky to transport. Many countries have banned the practice or require the whole shark to be brought back to port before the removal of its fins.

Shark finning increased since 1997 largely due to the increasing demand for shark fins for shark fin soup and traditional cures, particularly in China, Taiwan and Southeast Asia. Shark fin soup substitutes have lately also appeared on the market which do not require any shark fins.

The International Union for Conservation of Nature's Shark Specialist Group say that shark finning is widespread, and that "the rapidly expanding and largely unregulated shark fin trade represents one of the most serious threats to shark populations worldwide". Estimates of the global value of the shark fin trade range from US$540 million to US$1.2 billion (2007). Shark fins are among the most expensive seafood products, commonly retailing at US$400 per kg. In the United States, where finning is prohibited, some buyers regard the whale shark and the basking shark as trophy species, and pay $10,000 to $20,000 for a fin.

The regulated global catch of sharks reported to the Food and Agriculture Organization of the United Nations has been stable in recent years at an annual average just over 500,000 tonnes. Additional unregulated and unreported catches are thought to be common.

Shark finning has caused catastrophic harm to the marine ecosystem. Roughly 73 to 100 million sharks are killed each year by finning. A variety of shark species are threatened by shark finning, including the critically endangered scalloped hammerhead shark.

== Process ==
Highlights showing the typical targets of finning

Nearly every fin of a shark is targeted for harvest, as highlighted in the diagram. The primary and secondary dorsal fins are removed from the top of the shark, plus its pectoral fins, and, in a single cutting motion, the pelvic fin, anal fin, and bottom portion of its caudal fin, or tail.

Because the rest of the shark has little value relative to that of its fins, sharks are sometimes finned while fishing vessels are still at sea, and the finless and often still-living shark is thrown back into the sea to free space aboard the vessel. In legal contexts the use of the term "shark finning" can refer specifically to this practice of removing the fins from live sharks and discarding the carcass while still at sea. For these legal purposes the removal of fins on land during catch processing is not necessarily considered to be shark finning.

Shark species that are most commonly finned are:

- Blacktip (Carcharhinus limbatus)
- Blue (Prionace glauca) (a species of requiem shark)
- Bull (Carcharhinus leucas) (a species of requiem shark)
- Hammerhead (family Sphyrnidae)
- Oceanic whitetip (Carcharhinus longimanus) (a species of requiem shark)
- Porbeagle (Lamna nasus) (a species of mackerel shark)
- Shortfin Mako (Isurus oxyrinchus) (a species of mackerel shark)
- Sandbar (Carcharhinus plumbeus) (a species of requiem shark)
- Silky (Carcharhinus falciformis) (a species of requiem shark)
- Spinner (Carcharhinus brevipinna (a species of requiem shark)
- Thresher (family Alopiidae)
- Tiger (Galeocerdo cuvier) (a species of requiem shark)
- Great white shark (Carcharodon carcharias) (a species of mackerel shark)

== Impacts ==
=== On individual sharks ===
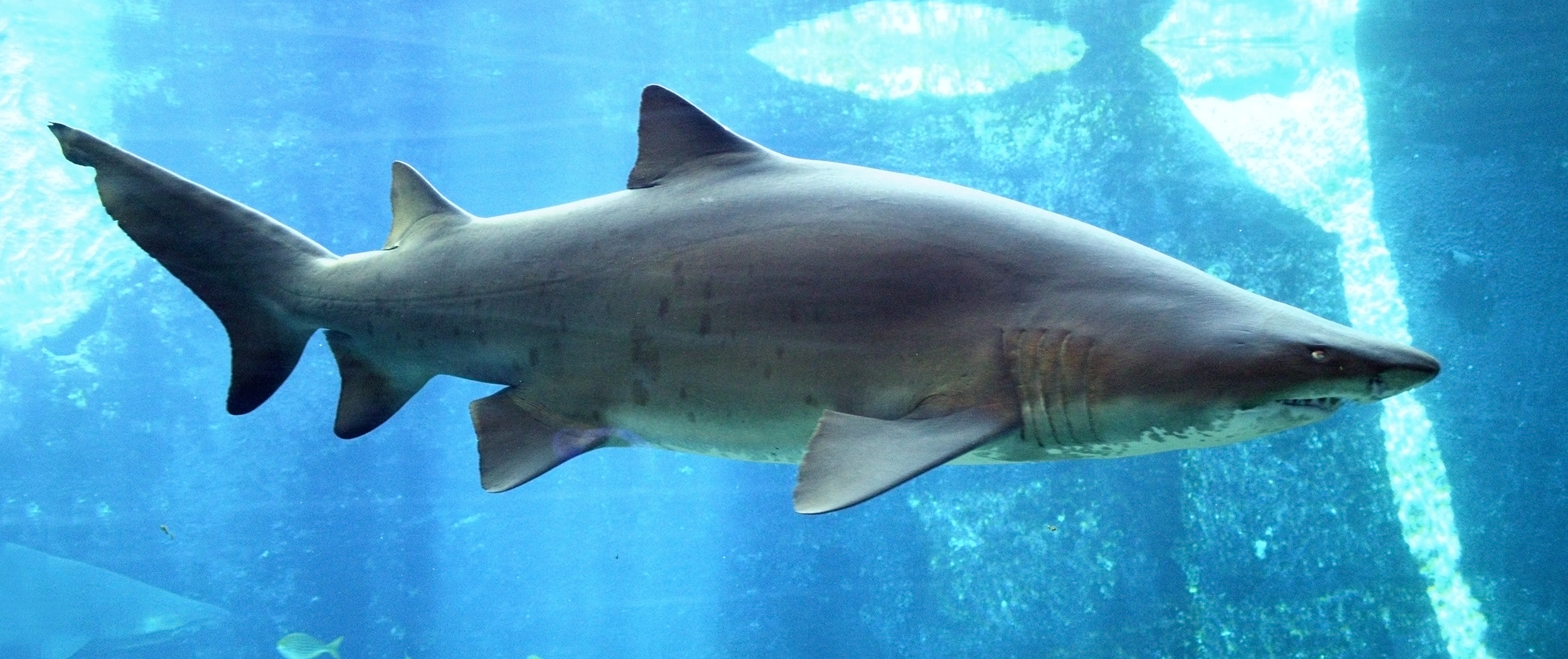
The sand tiger shark is a large coastal shark that inhabits coastal waters worldwide. Its numbers have declined significantly, and it is now listed as a critically endangered species on the IUCN Red List.

When sharks have been finned, they are likely to die from lack of oxygen because they are not able to move to filter the water through their gills, or are eaten by other fish that have found them defenseless at the bottom of the ocean. Studies suggest that more than 100 million sharks are finned each year, and scientists have noted that the numbers could potentially be more than 100 Million. The majority of shark species exhibit slow growth rates and low reproductive rates, and the rate of reproduction cannot keep pace with the current mortality rate.

=== On shark populations ===
Some studies suggest 26 to 73 million sharks are harvested annually for fins. The annual median for the period from 1996 to 2000 was 38 million, which is nearly four times the number recorded by the Food and Agriculture Organization (FAO) of the United Nations, but considerably lower than the estimates of many conservationists. It has been reported that the global shark catch in 2012 was 100 million.

Sharks have a K-selection life history, which means that they tend to grow slowly, reach maturity at a larger size and a later age, and have low reproductive rates. These traits make them especially vulnerable to overfishing methods, such as shark finning. Recent studies suggest changes in abundance of apex predators may have cascading impacts on a variety of ecological processes.

Numbers of some shark species have dropped as much as 80% over the last 50 years. Some organizations claim that shark fishing or bycatch (the unintentional capture of species by other fisheries) is the reason for the decline in some species' populations, and that the market for fins has very little impact – bycatch accounts for an estimated 50% of all sharks taken. Others suggest that the market for shark fin soup is the main reason for the decline.

=== On other populations ===
Sharks are apex predators and have extensive implications for marine systems and processes, particularly coral reefs. A report by WildAid on global threats to sharks further explains the importance of these animals.

Fins from sawfish (Pristidae) "are highly favored in Asian markets and are some of the most valuable shark fins". Sawfishes are now protected under the highest protection level of the Convention on International Trade in Endangered Species (CITES), Appendix I.

Live Science said the following:

"The overfishing of sharks [has] serious effects for the entire marine food chain in some ecosystems. [...] [A] study found that removing sharks from a reef environment in the Caribbean had a trickling effect on other species. Without sharks, carnivorous fish that the sharks usually fed on thrived. The carnivorous fish, in turn, preyed on parrotfish that kept the corals clean. In time, the reefs changed from one dominated by coral to one overrun by algae."

Studies conducted by Creel and Christianson (2008) have shown that with a decreased population of large sharks, there was an increase in marine mammals and reptiles. This can cause a plummeting effect within the marine ecosystem; they're driven by both consumptive and non-consumptive behaviors. However, we are only starting to understand the role sharks play in the ecosystem and natural environments. Due to the difficulties of studying sharks in their natural habitats, a majority of the studies have been conducted in a model of the natural ecosystem (Ferretti et al., 2010).

== Vulnerability of sharks ==
On the IUCN Red List there are 39 species of elasmobranchs (sharks and rays) listed as threatened species (Critically Endangered, Endangered or Vulnerable). Sharks are an important part of the ocean ecosystem and are "an indicator for ocean health." Their role keeps the environment healthy because "they usually go after the sick, weak and slower fish populations." Due to shark overfishing in many areas in the world sharks are going missing or endangered.

In 2013, the Convention on International Trade in Endangered Species of Wild Fauna and Flora (CITES) listed the vulnerability of sharks.

Appendix I, which lists animals that are threatened with extinction, lists

- Requiem sharks (i.e. Tiger Sharks, Bull Sharks, etc.)
- Hammerhead sharks
- Thresher sharks
- Basking sharks
- Mackerel sharks
- Eagle and mobulid rays
- Freshwater stingrays
- Whale sharks
- Sawfishes

Appendix II, which lists animals that are not necessarily now threatened with extinction but that may become so unless trade is closely controlled, lists

- Basking shark (Cetorhinus maximus)
- Great white shark (Carcharodon carcharias)
- Whale shark (Rhincodon typus)

A further five species are listed as of 2014 –

- Scalloped hammerhead (Sphyrna lewini)
- Great hammerhead shark (Sphyrna mokarran)
- Smooth hammerhead (Sphyrna zygaena)
- Porbeagle (Lamna nasus)
- Oceanic whitetip shark (Carcharhinus longimanus)

== Opposition ==
The crew of the Sea Shepherd Conservation Society conservation vessel RV Ocean warrior witnessed and photographed industrial-scale finning within Costa Rica's Cocos Island National Park protected marine area. The practice is featured in the documentary Sharks: Stewards of the Reef, which contains footage from Western Australia and Central America. This documentary also examines shark finning's cultural, financial, and ecological impacts. Underwater photographer Richard Merritt witnessed finning of living sharks in Indonesia where he saw immobile finless sharks lying on the sea bed still alive below the fishing boat. Finning has been witnessed and filmed within a protected marine area in the Raja Ampat islands of Indonesia.

Animal welfare and animal rights groups vigorously oppose finning on moral grounds, as the practice gives sharks a large wound, causes them to slowly die of starvation or drowning, and because finning is one cause for the rapid decline of global shark populations.

According to Canadian journalist Geoffrey York, shark finning is sometimes linked to organized crime, including Chinese organized crime syndicates in South Africa, Fiji, and Hawaii.

Opponents also raise questions on the medical harm from the consumption of high levels of toxic mercury reportedly found in shark fins. a, A multi-disciplinary nonprofit 501(c)(3) scientific research organization says, "The reason indulging in this dish can be so harmful is because of bioaccumulation. Toxins concentrate in animals when they move up the food chain. Since sharks are some of the largest and longest-living species in the ocean, they have a high position on the food chain, so they consume huge amounts of toxins that have accumulated in their prey."

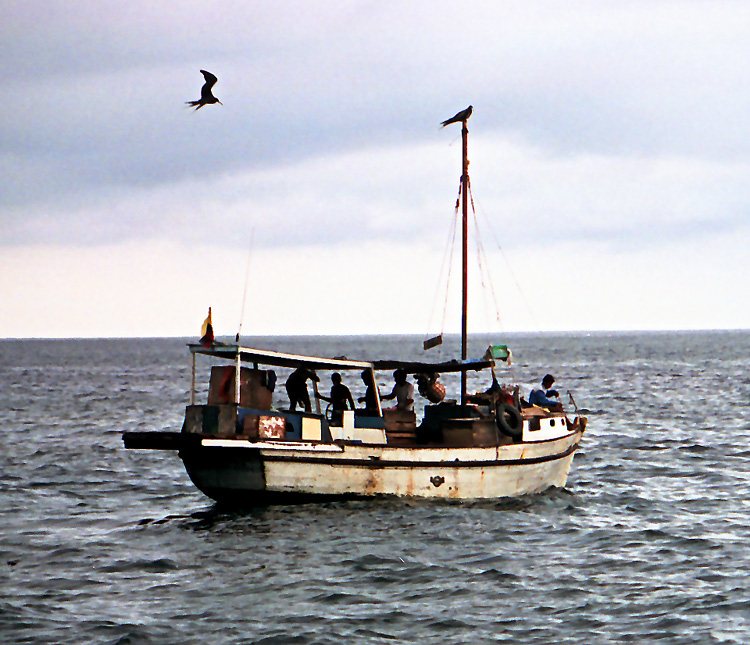
Shark fin fishing boat off the Galapagos, Ecuador

A third of fins imported to Hong Kong come from Europe. Spain is by far the largest supplier, providing between 2,000 and 5,000 metric tons a year. Norway supplies 39 metric tonnes, but Britain, France, Portugal, and Italy are also major suppliers. Hong Kong handles at least 50%, and possibly up to 80%, of the world trade in shark fin, with the major suppliers being Europe, Taiwan, Indonesia, Singapore, United Arab Emirates, United States, Yemen, India, Japan, and Mexico. According to Giam's article, "Sharks are caught in virtually all parts of the world.... Despite the strongly declared objectives of the Fisheries Commission in Brussels, there are very few restrictions on fishing for sharks in European waters. The meat of dogfishes, smoothhounds, cat sharks, skates and rays is in high demand by European consumers.... The situation in Canada and the United States is similar: the blue shark is sought after as a sport fish while the porbeagle, mako and spiny dogfish are part of the commercial fishery.... The truth is this: Sharks will continue to be caught and killed on a wide scale by the more organized and sophisticated fishing nations. Targeting shark's fin soup will not stop this accidental catch. The fins from these catches will be thrown away or turned into animal feed and fertilizers if shark's fin soup is shunned."

The Australian naturalist Steve Irwin was known to walk out of Chinese restaurants if he saw shark fin soup on the menu. American chef Ken Hom sees the West doing little to protect stocks of cod and caviar-producing sturgeon despite the outcry over shark-finning, but he also stresses the wastefulness of harvesting only the fins.

In 2006, Canadian filmmaker and photographer Rob Stewart created a film, Sharkwater, which exposes the shark fin industry in detail. In March 2011, the VOA Special English service of the Voice of America broadcast a 15-minute science program on shark finning.

In 2011, British celebrity chef Gordon Ramsay and his film crew visited Costa Rica to investigate illegal shark fin trading. After investigating the shark fins, Ramsay was held at gunpoint and doused in gasoline by gangsters for confronting them.

According to WildAid, opposition to shark finning in China has increased as a result of campaigns. In a 2008 survey in Beijing, 89% of respondents supported a ban on shark fin. A 2010 poll on Sina Weibo again indicated strong support for a ban on shark fin sales, with 27,370 respondents in favour and only 440 against. In an August 2013 survey of respondents from four cities in China, 91% supported a government ban on the shark fin trade.

WildAid noted in 2019 that although shark fin consumption decreased by 80% in mainland China since 2011, there was still large demand for it in Hong Kong, Macau and Taiwan. WildAid CEO Peter Knights also stated that demand was increasing in Thailand, Vietnam and Indonesia.

== Reporting ==
Global shark catch, since 1950. Source

According to Giam Choo Hoo – the longest serving member of The Convention on International Trade in Endangered Species of Wild Fauna and Flora Animals Committee, and a representative of the shark fin industry in Singapore – "The perception that it is common practice to kill sharks for only their fins – and to cut them off whilst the sharks are still alive – is wrong.... The vast majority of fins in the market are taken from sharks after their death."

Researchers dispute this claim by pointing to the data: using a statistical analysis of shark fin industry trade data, a 2006 study estimated that between 26 and 73 million sharks are harvested each year worldwide. That figure, when converted to shark biomass, was three to four times higher than the catch recorded in Food and Agriculture Organization capture production statistics, the only global database of shark catches. According to the researchers, this discrepancy "may be attributable to factors... such as unrecorded shark landings, shark biomass recorded in [non-specific] categories, and/or a high frequency of shark finning and carcass disposal at sea." The marine conservationist, Meliane, says "Moreover, landing sharks and rays with fins attached will facilitate species identification, promote standardized data collection and reporting of official catch statistics, and eliminate potential enforcement loopholes." Because remains are not always correctly identified, reports and statistics from scientists are not always reliable. Simply put, they say that the industry is either under-reporting the sharks taken annually, or is frequently engaging in the practice of finning.

According to Shark Stewards, a non profit, environmentalist project, "Most shark fins go to Hong Kong for processing, and re-exported to China and other countries like the US. Fins traded as a dried product do not have any documentation of where that shark was captured, the species or if it was legally harvested or finned on the high seas." As a result, many consumers do not know where the fin came from, or if it was caught legally or illegally.

== International restrictions ==
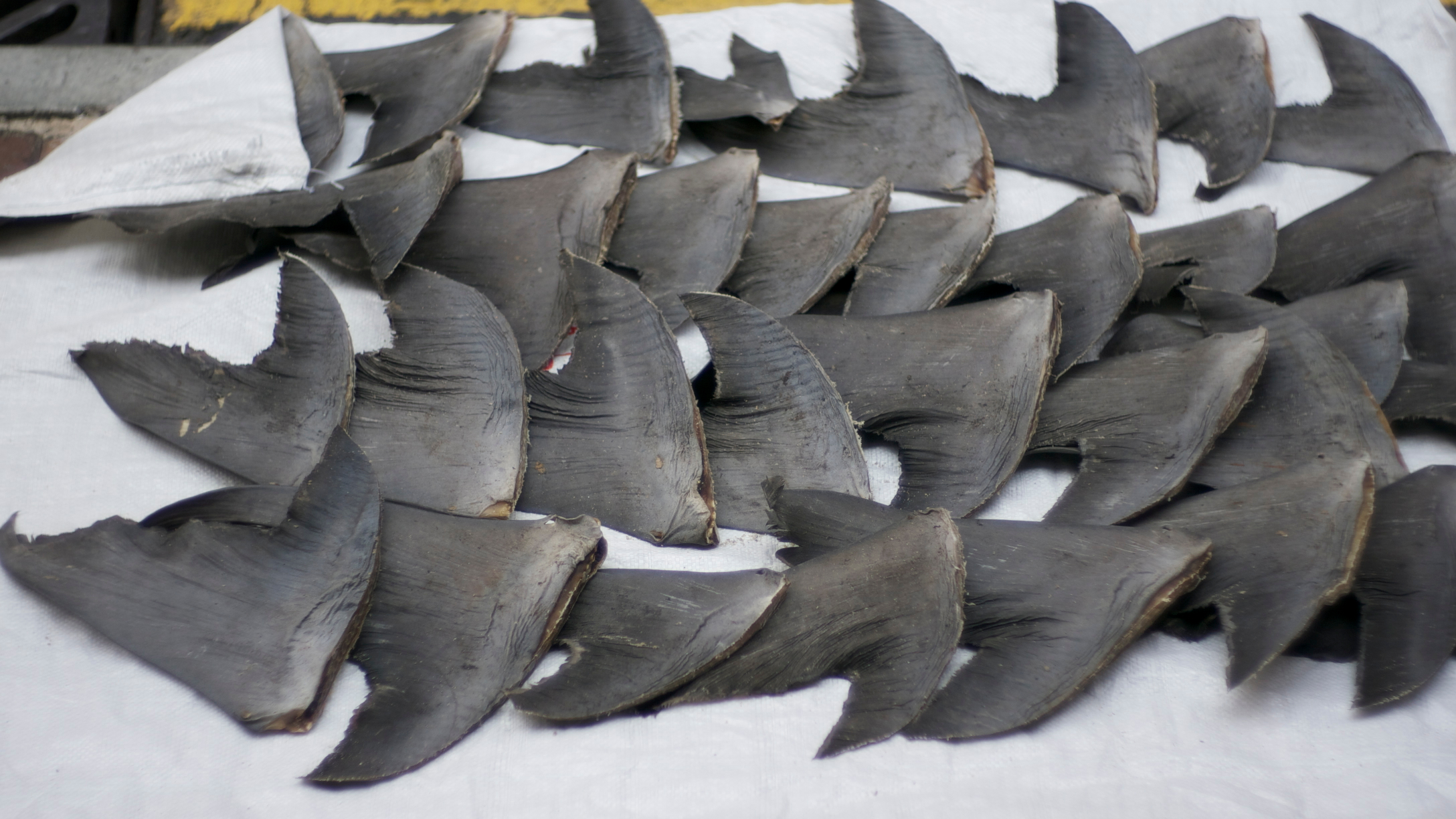
Fresh shark fins drying on a pavement in Hong Kong

In 2013, 27 countries and the European Union had banned shark finning; international waters are unregulated. International fishing authorities are considering banning shark fishing (and finning) in the Atlantic Ocean and Mediterranean Sea. Finning is banned in the Eastern Pacific, but shark fishing and finning continues unabated in most of the Pacific and Indian Ocean. In countries such as Thailand and Singapore, public awareness advertisements on finning have reportedly reduced consumption by 25%.

There are four main categories of restrictions, as follows:

1. A shark sanctuary is an area where shark fishing is entirely prohibited, this includes commercial fishing of all sharks, by-catching, the possession, trade, and sale of sharks & shark products. Although these acts against sharks are prohibited within these boundaries, nothing is really keeping the sharks within those boundaries, they can easily, unknowingly swim outside of the protected area and be fished, finned, or killed. As of March 2018, there are 17 shark sanctuaries in the world according to the article, "Shark Sanctuaries Around the World".
  - Maldives – 353,742 sq. mi. (Established in 2010)
  - Palau – 233,317 sq. mi. (Established in 2009)
  - Federated States of Micronesia – 1,155,448 sq. mi. (Established in 2015)
  - Marshall Islands – 769,205 sq. mi. (Established in 2015)
  - Samoa – 49,421 sq. mi. (Established in 2018)
  - New Caledonia – 480,697 sq. mi. (Established in 2013)
  - Cook Islands – 756,812 sq. mi. (Established in 2012)
  - French Polynesia – 1.840,642 sq. mi. (Established in 2012)
  - Honduras – 92,757 sq. mi. (Established in 2011)
  - The Bahamas – 242.971 sq. mi. (Established in 2011)
  - Dominican Republic – 104,050 sq. mi. (Established in 2017)
  - Cayman Islands – 45,998 sq. mi. (Established in 2015)
  - Bonaire – 3,747 sq. mi. (Established in 2015)
  - British Virgin Islands – 30,933 sq. mi. (Established in 2014)
  - St. Maarten – 193 sq. mi. (Established in 2016)
  - Saba – 3,102 sq. mi. (Established in 2015)
2. Areas where sharks must be landed with fins attached;
3. Areas where fin to body mass ratio-based regulations have been implemented;
4. Areas where shark product trade regulations exist.

=== European Union ===
Shark finning was prohibited in the EU in 2003 (Regulation (EC) No 1185/2003).

In November 2011, the EC approved a rule that would require all EU-registered fishing boats to land only sharks which have retained all their fins. Because the legislation allowed fins to be removed on the boat and other body parts to be landed at different ports, the ban proved difficult to enforce. The EU Parliament's fisheries committee supported the EC's proposal to ban the separate landing of shark bodies and fins; however, the committee approved an amendment which allows fins to be removed on board a vessel.

On 19 March 2012, the Council of the EU adopted a general approach supporting the commission's proposal to close the loopholes in the EU shark finning legislation by ensuring that all sharks were landed with their fins naturally attached without exception. It is believed that Spain and Portugal were the only EU Member States to raise objections to the commission's proposal.

On 6 June 2013, the Council of the EU completed the final step to close loopholes in the EU shark finning ban. By adopting a 'fins naturally attached' (FNA) policy without exception, the EU has now effectively ended the practice of shark finning by EU vessels.

== National and district restrictions ==
=== Australia ===
Live shark finning, the practice of cutting the fins from live sharks and dumping the body, is illegal in all jurisdictions in Australia. Australia still participates in the shark fin trade. 'Fins Naturally Attached' (FNA) is the policy employed to reduce and regulate live shark finning in Australia fisheries. But not all states in Australia have adopted this policy. In Queensland and Western Australia, there is no 'fins naturally attached' policy, meaning that illegal live finning and dumping of sharks could still be occurring. Recently, the NT (Northern Territory) Government implemented reforms to its shark fishery that impose stricter regulation by enforcing a 'Fins Naturally Attached' policy, in line with international and national best practise. FNA means that sharks must be brought back to land with the fins attached to the shark body, which has been shown to greatly reduce illegal targeting, dumping of unwanted sharks at sea, and prevent live shark finning.

Shark finning is not allowed in any tuna or billfish longline fishery, or in any Commonwealth fishery taking sharks. Fins must be landed attached, and additional regulations apply in some states or territories. In New South Wales, sharks taken, or any relevant portion of a shark taken, may not be on board any vessel at any time (including after landing) without fins naturally attached.

==== Imported products ====
In Australia, the export and import of wildlife and wildlife products is regulated under Part 13A of the federal Environment Protection and Biodiversity Conservation Act 1999 (EPBC Act), which is administered by the Department of Sustainability, Environment, Water, Population and Communities. Regulation applies equally to individuals, commercial organizations and not-for-profit organizations. CITES Appendix II shark specimens cannot be legally imported into Australia for personal or commercial purposes unless:

- The specimen is accompanied by a valid Australian CITES import permit (Australian import permits can be granted only if an overseas CITES export permit has been granted); or
- The specimen is accompanied by a valid certificate issued by the overseas CITES management authority confirming that the specimen was obtained before the species was listed on CITES (pre-CITES certificate); or
- The specimen is accompanied by an overseas CITES export permit or equivalent, is part of personal accompanied baggage and is intended for personal use and not for trade or sale.

No permits are required for the import of specimens obtained from shark species other than those listed above. To avoid seizure, all products must be clearly labeled or have documentation certifying the species of origin.

=== Canada ===
Shark finning has been illegal in Canada since 1994. As of 2019, the 42nd Canadian Parliament enacted legislation that bans the import and export of shark fins, being the first country to impose a national ban.

In late 2011, the city of Brantford, Ontario became the first city in Canada to pass new bylaws to ban the possession, sale, or consumption of shark fin products. In that medium-sized city in which no restaurants which serve shark fin exist, there was no opposition to the ban, which was largely symbolic. Nevertheless, a handful of cities soon followed, including Toronto, Calgary, Mississauga, and several others in Southern Ontario:

- Brantford, Ontario 11 to 0 vote
- Oakville, Ontario 7 to 0 vote
- Mississauga, Ontario 11 to 0 vote (later repealed by Council on 8 May 2013)
- Toronto 38 to 4 vote (later overturned by court on 30 November 2012)
- Newmarket, Ontario 8 to 1 vote
- Calgary 13 to 2 vote

Markham and Richmond Hill opted not to bring forth the motion, suggesting that this issue is a federal matter. Chinese restaurants and businesses selling shark fin opposed the ban, and in late 2011, suggested that they will challenge the by-laws before the courts once fines are imposed. When Toronto imposed steep fines, they did just that.

In late 2012, the Ontario Superior Court overturned Toronto's shark fin ban, ruling that the law as written was outside the powers of the city to impose without a "legitimate local purpose," and was therefore of "no force and effect." The judge accepted that the practice of shark finning was inhumane, but he did not agree with Toronto's justification of local purpose —– namely, that the consumption of shark fins may have an "adverse impact" on the health and safety of its residents and on the environmental well-being of the city. Toronto has served legal notice that it plans to appeal the court ruling.

On 1 December 2012, Ontario Superior Court Judge James Spence ruled that Toronto's ban was not valid. Members of Toronto's Chinese business community had also challenged that ban. Judge Spence said that the city does not have the power to enforce the ban. In September 2012, Toronto's mayor Rob Ford believed that the ban was not the city's responsibility, and so he did not support it at that time.

On 27 March 2013 a private members bill to ban the importation of shark fins into Canada failed in the House of Commons. Shark finning was already illegal in Canada but there was no law which prohibited the importation of shark fins into Canada. Efforts to prohibit shark fin importation was restarted in the next Parliament by Conservative Senator Michael L. MacDonald in Bill S-238 which was passed by the Senate on 23 October 2018.

Calgary's city council decided to wait until December 2013 to recommended leaning away from a total ban and look for ethical sources of shark products. Alderman John Mar said there would be more time to discuss, engage, and look for other options. The new wording in the bylaw was meant to ban the sale, distribution, and trade of shark fins, but not ban the possession and consumption. Canada's city of Vancouver's Councillor Kerry Jang said at Calgary's council meeting that it was not a "cultural thing," and that even China and the Chinese government decided to phase out all shark fins from state banquets. He also mentioned that the wordings of the bylaws in Calgary and Toronto, which face legal problems with municipal jurisdiction, are trying to ban possession and consumption, but that is hard to enforce and regulate.

On 27 May 2013, against the wishes of the Shark Fin Free Calgary organization, Calgary City Council overturned the ban. There were protests against the ban from Calgary's Chinese community, and Calgary's city task force recommended against the ban. According to the article in The Calgary Herald, Calgary's Mayor Naheed Nenshi never wanted a full ban, even though he had voted for the ban the previous year.

=== China ===
NBA All-Star Chinese basketball player Yao Ming pledged to stop eating shark fin soup at a news conference on 2 August 2006. American basketball player Tracy McGrady, a teammate of Yao's, reportedly stated that he was impressed by the soup when he tried it for the first time, but was criticized by the Hong Kong branch of the World Wide Fund for Nature for his remark.

Opinions suggest that government corruption and official banquets contribute to the consumption of shark fins. A ban on shark fin from government banquets was announced in July 2012 and went into effect in 2013.

=== Hong Kong ===
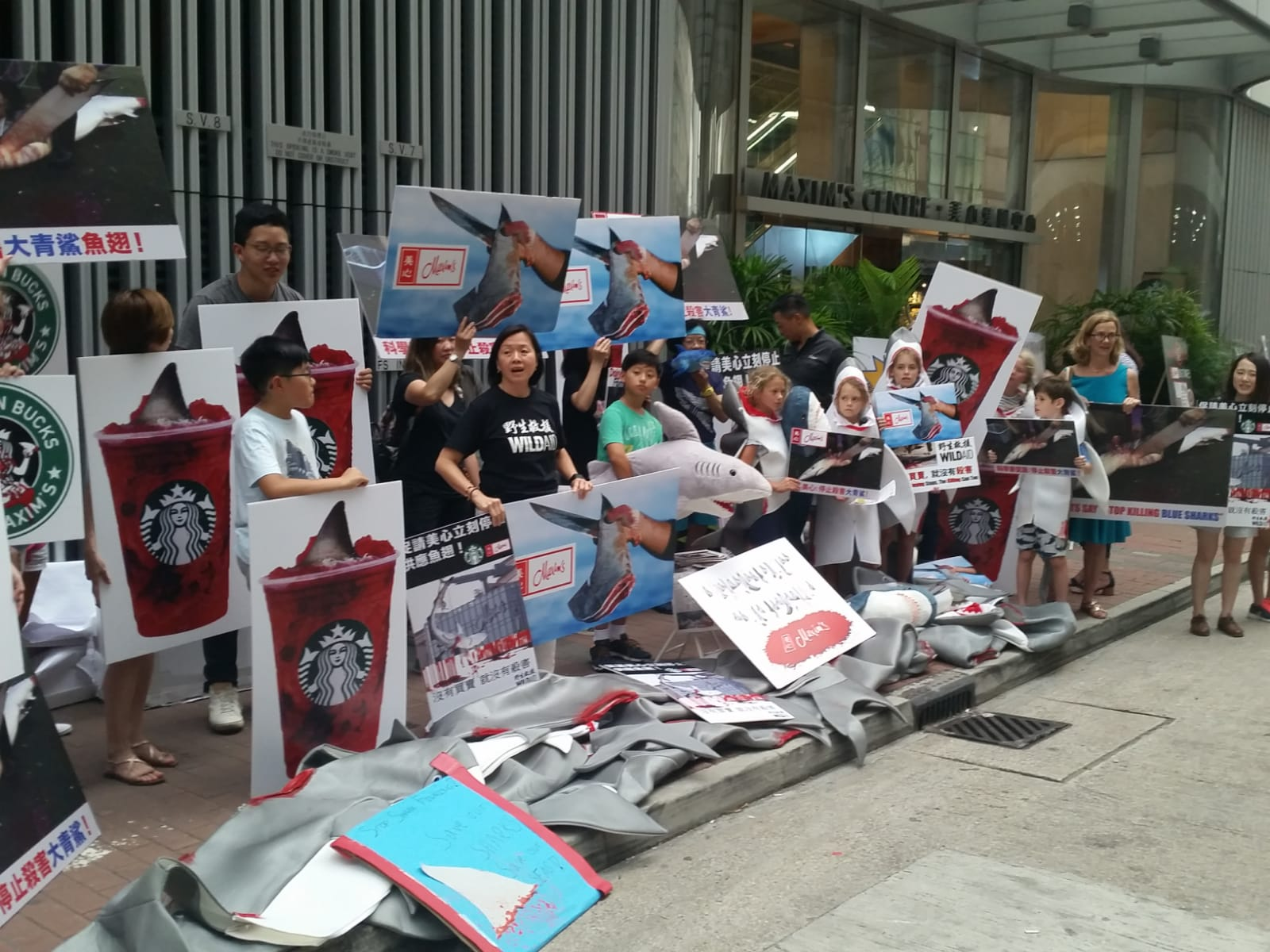
Shark fin protesters at Maxim's HQ, Hong Kong, on June 15, 2018, also protesting Starbucks' decision to grant their regional license to Maxim's.

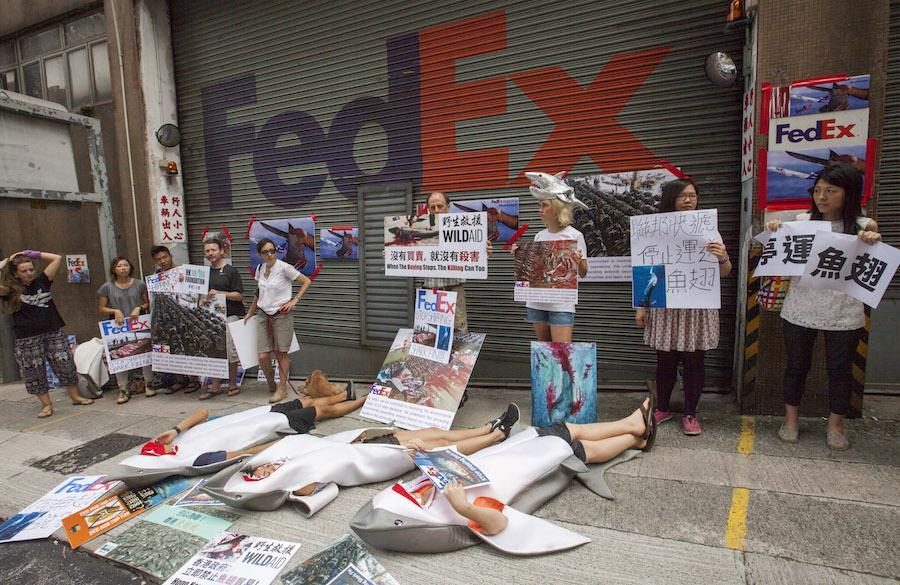
Anti shark fin protesters at the FedEx depot in Hong Kong's Kennedy Town 3 July 2016

The World Wide Fund for Nature on 8 March 2018 reported, "The volume of shark fin imported into Hong Kong has declined from 10,210 tonnes in 2007 to 4,979 tonnes in 2017, a drop of over 50 per cent." Protesters have targeted various brands with anti-shark fin demonstrations. After being targeted in a May 2016 protest at Hong Kong International Airport, Cathay Pacific in June 2016 announced they would stop shipping shark fin. Hong Kong Disneyland removed shark fin soup from its wedding banquet menu after international pressure from environmental groups, who threatened to boycott its parks worldwide despite the high demand for the delicacy. The Peninsula Hotel banned shark fin in 2012. In April 2018, shark fin protesters gatecrashed the opening of Shake Shack at the IFC in Hong Kong. This was due to Shake Shack partnering with Maxim's Caterers being Shake Shack's Hong Kong licensee. Brand premises directly owned by Maxim's have been targeted in numerous protests. On 15 June 2018, protesters directly targeted Maxim's headquarters in a demonstration that also highlighted Maxim's being a regional licensee for Starbucks.

=== Taiwan ===
Taiwan banned shark finning in 2011. But, the legislation are mainly targeting fishing vessels, while resellers and restaurants are not properly regulated. It is reported that, at least until 2021, shark finning is pretty common at sea and hard to ban totally. Some medical stores even, allegedly, put fins from CITES-identified species at sale publicly .

In 2020, the Fisheries Agency deprecated the fin to body mass ratio-based regulations and enforce more restrictive regulations, requiring that fins are either naturally attached or tied to bodies, or (for small fishing boats only) fins and bodies are in the same bags or tagged with the same label. The Environment Justice Foundation comments that the new regulation would facilitate port inspections and law enforcement, helping reduce illegal shark finning.

=== Malaysia ===
Malaysia was one of the top 10 importers and exporters of shark fins in the world between 2000 and 2009. The country caught 231,212 tonnes of sharks from 2002 to 2011, making it the eighth highest in the world and accounting for 2.9% of the global sharks caught during the same period.

In 2007, Malaysia's Natural Resources and Environment Ministry, Azmi Khalid, banned shark's fin soup from official functions committing to the Malaysian Nature Society (for conservation of shark species). In 2012, the Sabah Tourism, Culture and Environment Minister proposed an amendment to the Fisheries Act that would give force to set up a shark sanctuary zone in Semporna and other shark populated areas in Sabah. This ban was put on hold pending the Federal Government's decision on the issue. In 2015, Agriculture and Agro-based Industry Minister, Ahmad Shabery Cheek, said that the ban of shark finning is "unnecessary" as the finning industry does not exist in Malaysia. He went on further to say that "sharks are normally caught by accident when they enter the fishnets along with the other fishes."

=== New Zealand ===
The great white sharks have been given full protection in the territorial waters of New Zealand but shark finning is legal on other shark species if the shark is dead. The Royal Forest and Bird Protection Society of New Zealand are campaigning to raise awareness of shark finning and a number of foodies have fronted the campaign.

Since 1 October 2014, it has been illegal in New Zealand for a commercial fisher to remove the fins from any shark and discard the body at sea. There are specific requirements for certain species.

=== Palau ===
In 2009, the Republic of Palau created the world's first shark sanctuary. It is illegal to catch sharks within Palau's EEZ, which covers an area of 230,000 square miles (600,000 km^{2}). This is an area about the size of France. President Johnson Toribiong also called for a ban on global shark finning, stating: "These creatures are being slaughtered and are perhaps at the brink of extinction unless we take positive action to protect them."

=== Singapore ===
Leading Singapore-based supermarket chain, Cold Storage, has joined the World Wide Fund for Nature Singapore Sustainable seafood Group and agreed to stop selling all shark fin and shark products in its 42 outlets across the country. The supermarket is a subsidiary of Dairy Farm, a leading pan-Asian food retailer that operates more than 5,300 outlets and employs some 80,000 people in the Asia-Pacific region. It is the first supermarket in Singapore to implement a no shark fins policy.

The largest supermarket chain in Singapore, NTUC FairPrice and hypermarket Carrefour will also be banning all shark fin products from its outlets before April 2012.

=== United States ===
==== National ====
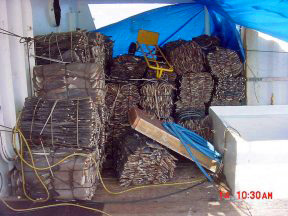
The King Diamond II was seized in 2002 while carrying over 32 short tons (29 metric tons) of shark fins that were harvested from about 30,000 sharks.

The 106th United States Congress passed the Shark Finning Prohibition Act of 2000 (SFPA) which was signed into law by Bill Clinton. The Act banned finning on any fishing vessel within United States territorial waters and on all U.S.-flagged fishing vessels in international waters. Additionally, shark fins could not be imported into the United States without the associated carcass.

In 2002, in an apparent early success in stopping the shark fin trade, the United States intercepted and seized the King Diamond II, a U.S.-flagged, Hong Kong-based vessel bound for Guatemala. The vessel was carrying 64,695 pounds (32.3 short tons; 29.3 tonnes) of baled shark fins – representing the fins of an estimated 30,000 sharks – making it the largest quantity of shark fins ever seized. This seizure was reversed in court six years later: in United States v. Approximately 64,695 Pounds of Shark Fins, the Ninth Circuit Court of Appeals held that the SFPA did not cover the seized fins in this case. Judge Stephen Reinhardt found that the King Diamond II did not meet the statute's definition of a fishing vessel, since it had merely bought the fins at sea and had not aided or assisted the vessels that had caught the sharks.

As a result, in January 2011, the 111th United States Congress wrote and passed, and President Barack Obama signed into law, the Shark Conservation Act to close the loopholes. Specifically, the new Act prohibits any boat to from possessing shark fins without the corresponding number and weight of carcasses and all sharks must be brought to port with their fins attached.

Additional legislation has been proposed to ban the sale of shark fins in the United States as well. Current national bans prohibit shark finning in United States territorial waters but do not ban the sale or purchase of shark fins that were harvested elsewhere. To combat this, the 117th United States Congress added the "Shark Fin Sales Elimination Act" in the National Defense Authorization Act for Fiscal Year 2022, which was signed into law by Joe Biden in December 2022.

The Act bans the sale, purchase, and transport of shark fins across the United States with a fine of up to $100,000 for each offense. Exceptions are allowed if the fin was taken lawfully by license or under other certain circumstances. There is also an exception to allow dogfish fins, although the bill has the Secretary of Commerce reviewing this exception by 2027 to recommend if it should continue or be terminated.

==== State ====
The Shark Fin Sales Elimination Act, enacted in 2022, banned the shark fin trade throughout the United States but before its enactment several states enacted their own measures to ban the shark fin trade with their boundaries. Before the national ban was enacted, 14 states and 3 territories passed their own versions of the bill.

In 2010, Hawaii became the first state to ban the possession, sale, and distribution of shark fins. The Act commenced on 1 July 2011. Similar laws have been enacted in the states of Washington, Oregon, California, the territory of Guam, and the Commonwealth of the Northern Mariana Islands. California governor Jerry Brown cited the cruelty of finning and potential threats to the environment and commercial fishing in signing the bill. Opponents charged the ban was discriminatory against Chinese, the main consumers of shark fin soup, when federal laws already banned the practice of finning. Whole sharks would still be legally fished, but the fins could no longer be sold.

In 2012, legislators in the New York State Assembly, including Grace Meng, introduced a similar bill, which passed in 2013. New York was not the only Eastern state considering a ban, but enactment there would be significant since its Chinese-American communities in Chinatown, Manhattan and Flushing make New York the major importer of shark fins in the East. Meng admitted that while she loved shark fin soup, "it's important to be responsible citizens." Younger Chinese Americans in New York did not consider it an important part of their culture. "It's only the elderly who want it: when their grandkids get married, they want the most expensive stuff, like an emperor," said one waiter at a Chinese restaurant. Many businesses that sold fins had stopped placing new orders, expecting a ban would be enacted.

In April 2013, Maryland became the first state on the East Coast to enact a law against shark finning or the import of fins.Subsequently, Texas, Illinois, Delaware, Rhode Island, and Massachusetts had enacted bans on the possession and sale of shark fins, totaling 11 states.

In June 2017, the Nevada Legislature banned the sale or possession of body parts from sharks and several other endangered species and outlawed shark fin soup, which was becoming increasingly consumed in Nevada by visitors at casinos, making it a hub for the shark fin trade in the United States.

In January 2020, the New Jersey General Assembly criminalized the harvesting, sale, trade, distribution, and possession of shark fins, becoming the 13th state to do so. Money generated from violations of the ban would be used to fund wildlife conservation in the state.

In 2020, the Florida Legislature enacted the "Kristin Jacobs Ocean Conservation Act" which banned the shark fin trade throughout the state.

== See also ==
- Chinese imperial cuisine
- Declawing of crabs
- Endangered sharks: many sharks are endangered as a consequence of the market for shark fins
- Pain in fish
- Shark culling
- Shark fin trading in Costa Rica
- Threatened sharks
