= Sharkwater Extinction =

2018 Canadian documentary film directed by Rob Stewart

- Canadian theatrical release poster
- Directed by: Rob Stewart
- Written by: Rob Stewart
- Produced by: Sandra Campbell; Brian Stewart; Rob Stewart; Nick Hector; Karen Shaw
- Cinematography: Rob Stewart
- Edited by: Nick Hector
- Music by: Jonathan Goldsmith
- Production companies: Big Screen Entertainment; Sharkwater Productions; Diatribe Pictures
- Distributed by: D Films Corporation
- Release dates: September 7, 2018 (TIFF); October 19, 2018 (Canada)
- Running time: 85 minutes
- Country: Canada
- Language: English

Sharkwater Extinction is a 2018 Canadian documentary film directed by Rob Stewart. It premiered at the 2018 Toronto International Film Festival. A sequel to his 2007 film Sharkwater, the film, which Stewart was working on at the time of his death in a diving accident in January 2017, was completed by the Rob Stewart Foundation in collaboration with director Sturla Gunnarsson and editor Nick Hector.

== Release ==
The film premiered on September 7, 2018, at a TIFF "Special Event" that served as both the film screening and a memorial tribute to Stewart. It also received a gala screening at the Cinéfest Sudbury International Film Festival, as well as screenings at the Calgary International Film Festival and the Vancouver International Film Festival. Rob Stewart's mother, Sandy Stewart, said "[the] entire team stayed with it, everybody stepped up. We have people from all over the world — cinematographers, filmmakers, really important people — offering to help finish this, and that was really heartwarming." Julie Andersen, who founded the nonprofit United Conservationists with Stewart, was part of this team.

== Reception ==
=== Critical response ===
Review aggregator Rotten Tomatoes reports an approval rating of 100% based on 30 reviews, with an average rating of 7.5/10. The site's critics' consensus reads: "Beautiful yet gut-wrenching, Sharkwater Extinction offers an eye-opening condemnation of an illegal trade -- and a poignant farewell to a talented filmmaker." IMDB reviewers gave it a 7.5/10 average rating. Metacritic reports a weighted average score of 76 out of 100 based on 8 critics, indicating "generally favorable reviews". POV, Canada's Documentary Magazine review stated: "Sharkwater Extinction is a touching tribute [to late director Rob Stewart] that will inevitably inspire more young minds to carry on Stewart’s mission."

The film was nominated for four awards and has won two. In 2018, it was nominated for Best Canadian Feature Film at the Toronto International Film Festival, nominated for the DGC Craft Award for Picture Editing - Documentary by the Directors Guild of Canada. In 2019 the film was nominated for Best Documentary at the Riviera International Film Festival and for Best Documentary Feature at the Ramsgate International Film and TV Festival. Sharkwater Extinction won two awards in 2019; Best Foreign Documentary Trailer at the Golden Trailer Awards and Best Editing in Documentary at the Canadian Cinema Editors Awards.
