= Geoffrey York =

Canadian journalist

Geoffrey York is a Canadian journalist who works as the Africa correspondent for The Globe and Mail, based in Johannesburg.

== Works ==
- York, Geoffrey (1987). The High Price of Health: A Patient's Guide to the Hazards of Medical Politics. James Lorimer Limited, Publishers. ISBN 978-1-55028-022-7.
- York, Geoffrey (1992). The Dispossessed: Life and Death in Native Canada. Little, Brown and Company (Canada). ISBN 978-0-316-90272-4.
- York, Geoffrey; Pindera, Loreen (1992). People of the Pines: the Warriors and the Legacy of Oka. Boston; Toronto: Little, Brown. ISBN 978-0-316-90271-7.
