= Rob Stewart (filmmaker) =

Canadian photographer, filmmaker and shark conservationist

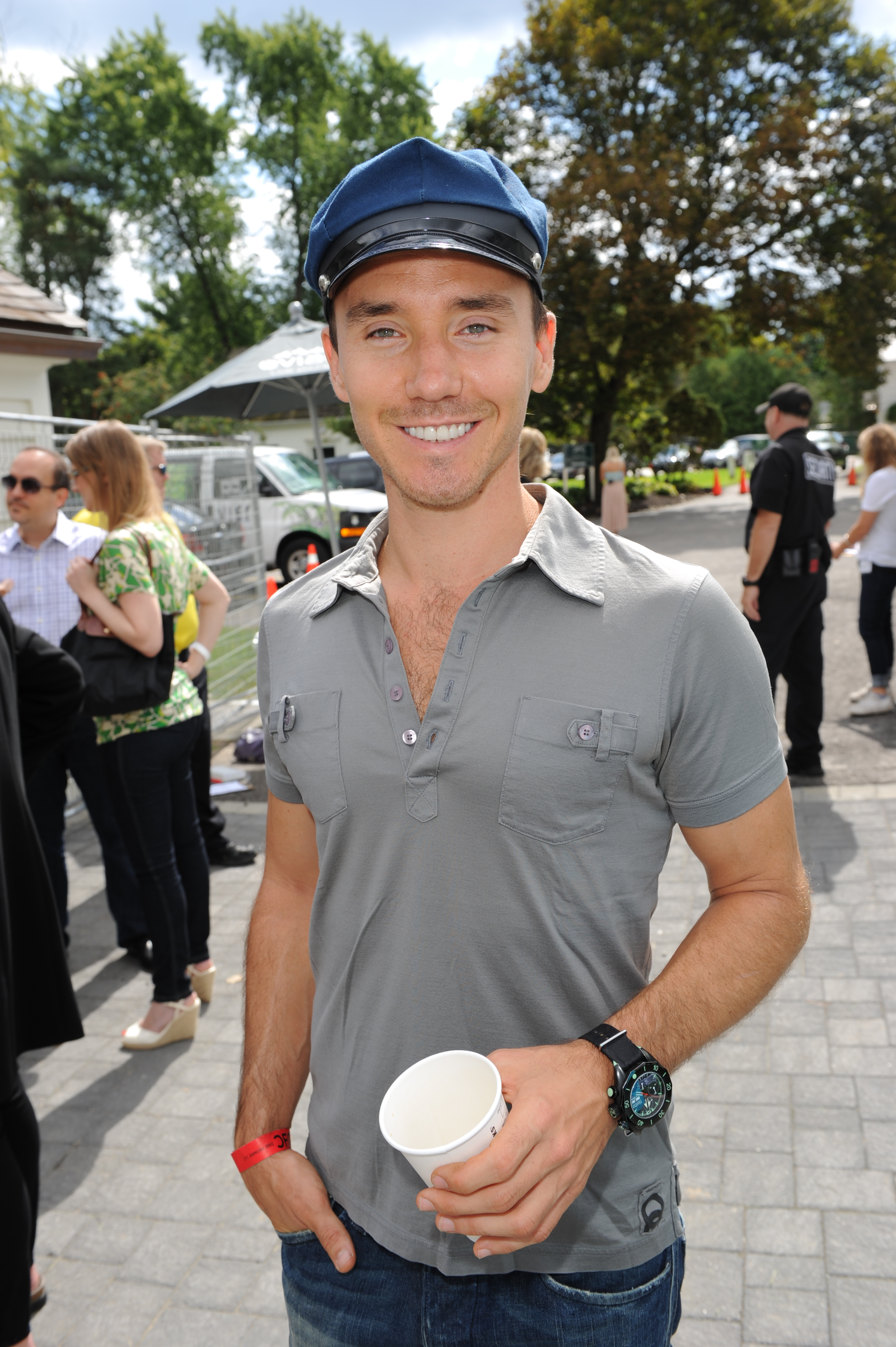
- Stewart in 2012
- Born: December 28, 1979; Toronto, Ontario, Canada
- Died: January 31, 2017 (aged 37); Alligator Reef, Florida, U.S.
- Cause of death: Drowning
- Education: Western University
- Occupations: Photographer, filmmaker

Rob Stewart (December 28, 1979 – January 31, 2017) was a Canadian photographer, filmmaker and shark conservationist. He was best known for making and directing the documentary films Sharkwater and Revolution. He drowned at the age of 37 while scuba diving in Florida, filming Sharkwater Extinction.

== Early life ==
Stewart was born in 1979, in Toronto, Ontario, the son of Sandra and Brian Stewart. He began underwater photography as a teenager, and became a scuba diving trainer at eighteen years old. He attended Lawrence Park Collegiate Institute and Crescent School in Toronto as a youth.

For four years, Stewart was chief photographer for the Canadian Wildlife Federation's magazines, and a freelance journalist. He won awards for his journalism. He held a bachelor's degree in biology from the University of Western Ontario, and studied zoology and marine biology in Kenya and Jamaica.

== Career ==
Stewart got the idea to make the movie Sharkwater at age 22, when he found illegal longline fishing in the Galapagos Marine Reserve. He travelled through fifteen countries for the next four years, studying and filming sharks, and going undercover to confront the shark fin industry. Sharkwater went on to win more than 40 awards at top film festivals. His follow-up film, 2012's Revolution, builds on Sharkwater, examining environmental collapse. In 2013, it was the highest grossing Canadian documentary, and it received 19 awards from global film festivals.

In 2012, Stewart released the book Save the Humans, a biography detailing the importance of sharks in his life and the importance of making a positive impact in the ocean.

In 2016, Stewart launched a Kickstarter to fund Sharkwater: Extinction, a sequel to Sharkwater that would focus on the 80 million sharks killed per year that are unaccounted for by scientists. He was working on the film at the time of his death.

== Awards and nominations ==
Stewart won more than 40 international awards for Sharkwater and 19 for Revolution.

Sharkwater earned Stewart the Best Documentary and the Audience Favorite Award at the 2006 Fort Lauderdale International Film Festival, the People's Choice Award at the 2006 Atlantic Film Festival and a Special Jury Award at the 2006 Hawaii International Film Festival, and the film was selected by the Toronto International Film Festival Group as one of the top ten Canadian films of 2006. In 2007, his film won the Audience and Best Feature awards at the Gen Art Film festival.

In 2008, he received a Genie Awards nomination for Best Documentary. He received a Genesis Award for Outstanding Documentary, and an Environmental Vision award at the 35th annual Vision awards in 2008, held in Los Angeles.

== Death ==
In late January 2017, Stewart was in Florida filming Sharkwater Extinction, a sequel to Sharkwater. On January 31, he and his dive partner resurfaced from a deep wreck dive of the Queen of Nassau. His dive leader Peter Sotis fell unconscious while boarding the crew's boat, and as the ship team rushed to provide assistance, Stewart, who was still in the water, vanished. Paul Watson, a marine wildlife conservation and environmental activist and friend of Stewart, noted that he had been using a rebreather, which could have rendered him unconscious as well.

A search was launched, and on February 3, the United States Coast Guard located Stewart's body in the water approximately 200 feet (61 m) down, close to where he disappeared. His funeral was held at Bloor Street United Church in Toronto on February 18, 2017. Released months later, the autopsy report from the Monroe County medical examiner said he died from drowning after falling to hypoxia at the surface of the ocean.

In spring 2017, Stewart's family filed a wrongful death lawsuit, alleging it was caused by the negligence of the dive operators who provided equipment that did not meet US safety standards and left him in the water without a dive leader.

== Legacy ==
Stewart was working on a sequel film, Sharkwater Extinction, at the time of his death. Using footage already shot by Stewart as well as his written comments, the movie was completed by film and story editor Nick Hector and director Sturla Gunnarsson for the Rob Stewart Foundation. It premiered at the 2018 Toronto International Film Festival in September, as a "Special Event" screening that also incorporated a memorial tribute to Stewart and his legacy; the official release date was set for October 5. His mother Sandy Stewart said about the completion of the film that "[the] entire team stayed with it, everybody stepped up. We have people from all over the world – cinematographers, filmmakers, really important people – offering to help finish this, and that was really heartwarming."

At the 5th Canadian Screen Awards on March 12, 2017, the Academy of Canadian Cinema and Television announced that its annual award for Science or Nature Documentary Program would be renamed the Rob Stewart Award in Stewart's memory.

In October 2018, Robert Osborne's documentary film The Third Dive: The Death of Rob Stewart, investigating the possible role of safety violations by the dive operator in Stewart's death, was broadcast by CBC Television as an episode of the documentary series CBC Docs POV.
