= Sharkwater =

2006 Canadian documentary film on overexploitation of sharks

- Promotional poster for Sharkwater
- Directed by: Rob Stewart
- Produced by: Rob Stewart
- Narrated by: Rob Stewart; Paul Watson
- Music by: Jeff Rona
- Distributed by: Freestyle Releasing
- Release dates: September 11, 2006 (Toronto International Film Festival); March 23, 2007 (United States)
- Running time: 89 minutes
- Country: Canada
- Language: English

Sharkwater is a 2006 Canadian documentary film written and directed by Rob Stewart. Helping to protect sharks, changing government policy, and inspiring the creation of shark conservation groups, Sharkwater is considered one of conservation's success stories, resulting in shark finning being banned in over 90 countries. In the film, Stewart documents current attitudes about sharks, and how shark-hunting industries are driving them to extinction.

Sharkwater explores the densest shark hunting populations in the world, exposing the exploitation and corruption of the shark-hunting industry in the marine reserves of Cocos Island, Costa Rica and the Galapagos Islands, Ecuador.

Stewart travels with Paul Watson and his Sea Shepherd Conservation Society ship as they confront shark poachers in Guatemala and Costa Rica. Among the group's experiences are boat confrontations, poachers, police, corrupt court systems, and eventually murder charges. Also, Stewart states how the increasing demand for shark-fin soup in Asia is fuelling an illegal trade in sharks. His expedition is cut short, however, when he is diagnosed with necrotizing fasciitis, from which he recovers.

Stewart discovers that sharks prevent the overconsumption of plankton by other fish, which moderates climate change. Yet sharks have gone from predator to prey, and while they have survived Earth's mass extinctions, they could be extinct within a few years.

The film has received 31 international awards.

== Sequel ==
Stewart was working on a sequel film, Sharkwater Extinction, at the time of his death in January 2017. The film was completed by Team Sharkwater, and premiered at the 2018 Toronto International Film Festival in September. Rob Stewart's Parents, Brian and Sandy Stewart, said "[the] entire team stayed with it, everybody stepped up. We have people from all over the world — cinematographers, filmmakers, really important people — offering to help finish this, and that was really heartwarming."
