= Blood bread =

Blood bread may refer to:

== Scandinavian foods ==
- Blodpalt, a Scandinavian dumpling made with blood
- Blodplättar, a Scandinavian blood pancake
- Paltbröd, a Scandinavian flatbread made with blood

== Other uses ==
- Blood bread, the growth of Serratia marcescens on bread
- Blood libel, the antisemitic trope that Jews make matzos from blood

== See also ==
- Blood as food
- Category:Blood dishes
