= Blood pasta =

Pasta made with blood

- Type: Pasta (Tagliatelle)
- Place of origin: South Tyrol
- Region or state: Trentino-Alto Adige/Südtirol
- Associated cuisine: South Tyrolean; Trentino
- Main ingredients: Rye flour, blood
- Ingredients generally used: Served with sage, Tyrolean grey cheese

Blood pasta (Italian: pasta al sangue; German: blutnudeln 'blood noodles', schwoasnudel 'black noodles') is a pasta delicacy of South Tyrol, eaten in Trentino-Alto Adige/Südtirol in both South Tyrolean cuisine and Trentino cuisine. The pasta is traditionally made from rye flour - typical to South Tyrolean pastas - and pig's blood, in a tagliatelle format. The blood lends the pasta a unique color varying between red, purple and brown.

Although eaten across Trentino-Alto Adige/Südtirol, blood pasta is particularly endemic to the Puster Valley.

The pasta was historically made during the traditional European autumn pig slaughter, in an effort to utilize all parts of the slaughtered pig. Blood pasta is traditionally pared with a sauce of butter, sage and cheese: cheeses used include farmer's cheese, and the regional specialty Tyrolean grey cheese.

== See also ==
- Blodpalt
- Sanguinaccio dolce
