= Dinuguan =

Filipino savory stew

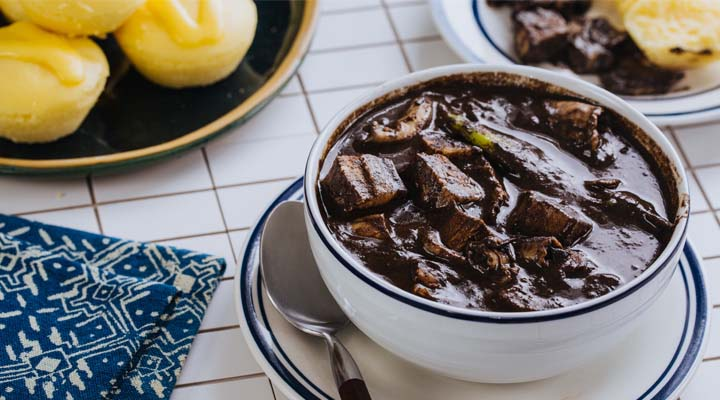
- A bowl of dinuguan and a plate of puto
- Alternative names: Pork blood stew, blood pudding stew
- Type: Stew
- Course: Main course
- Place of origin: Philippines
- Associated cuisine: Filipino
- Serving temperature: Hot
- Main ingredients: Pork offal, pig's blood, vinegar, garlic, siling haba

Dinuguan (Tagalog pronunciation: [dɪnʊgʊˈʔan]) is a Filipino savory stew usually of pork offal (typically lungs, kidneys, intestines, ears, heart and snout) and/or meat simmered in a rich, spicy dark gravy of pig blood, garlic, chili (most often siling haba), and vinegar.

== Etymology and names ==
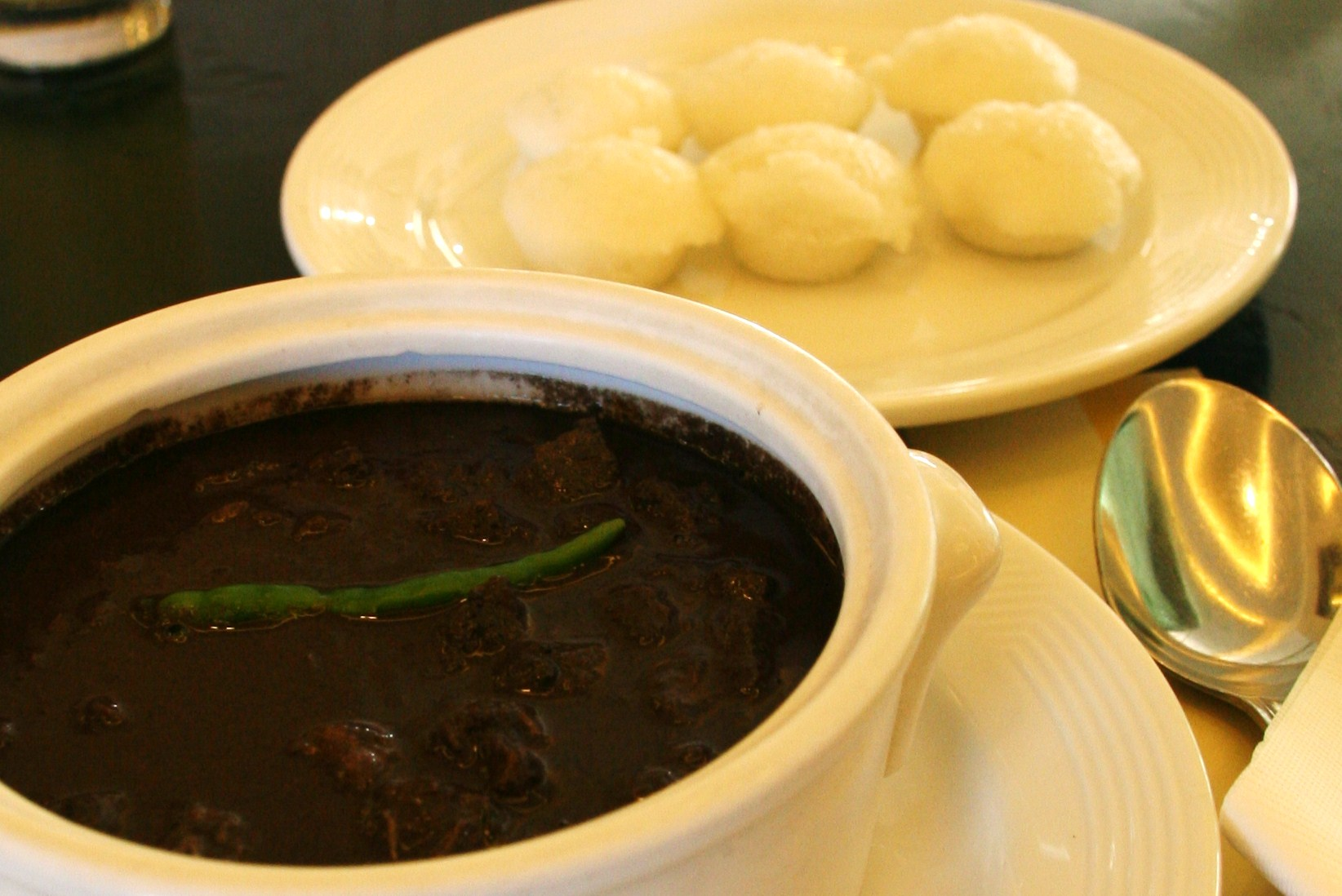
Dinuguan served with puto (Filipino rice cake).

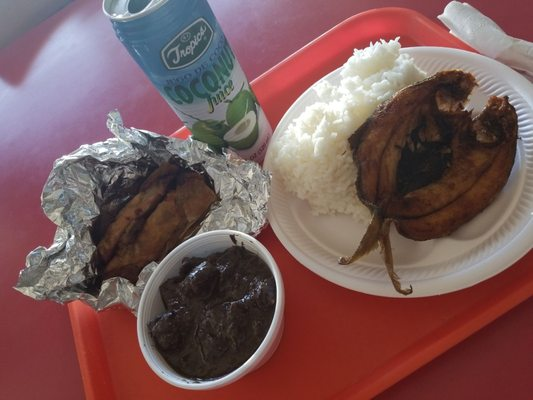
Dinuguan is more commonly eaten with rice. Also pictured: tuyo (fried dried fish)

The most popular term, dinuguan, and other regional naming variants come from their respective words for "blood" (e.g., "dugo" in Tagalog means "blood," hence "dinuguan" as "to be stewed with blood" or "bloody soup"). Possible English translations include pork blood stew or blood pudding stew.

Dinuguan is also called sinugaok in Batangas, zinagan in Ibanag, twik in Itawis, tid-tad in Kapampangan, dinardaraan in Ilocano, dugo-dugo in Cebuano, rugodugo in Waray, sampayna or champayna in Northern Mindanao, and tinumis in Bulacan and Nueva Ecija. A nickname for this dish is "chocolate meat".

Dinuguan is also found in the Mariana Islands, believed to have been introduced to the islands by Filipino immigrants, where it is known locally as fritada.

== Description ==
This dish is rather similar to the Polish soup czernina or an even more ancient Spartan dish known as melas zomos (black soup) whose primary ingredients were pork, vinegar and blood.

Dinuguan can also be served without using any offal, using only choice cuts of pork. In Batangas, this version is known as sinungaok. It can also be made from beef and chicken meat, the latter being known as dinuguang manok ('chicken dinuguan'). Dinuguan is usually served with white rice or a Philippine rice cake called puto. The Northern Luzon versions of the dish, namely the Ilocano dinardaraan and the Ibanag zinagan are often drier with toppings of deep-fried pork intestine cracklings. The Itawes of Cagayan also have a pork-based version that has larger meat chunks and more fat, which they call twik.

The most important ingredient of the dinuguan recipe, pig's blood, is used in many other Asian cuisines either as coagulated blood acting as a meat extender or as a mixture for the broth itself. Pork dinuguan is the latter.

The dish is not consumed by religious groups that have dietary laws prohibiting the consumption of blood, most notably the indigenous Iglesia ni Cristo, Jehovah's Witnesses, Members Church of God International, Seventh-day Adventists, Muslims and Jews.

== Preparation ==
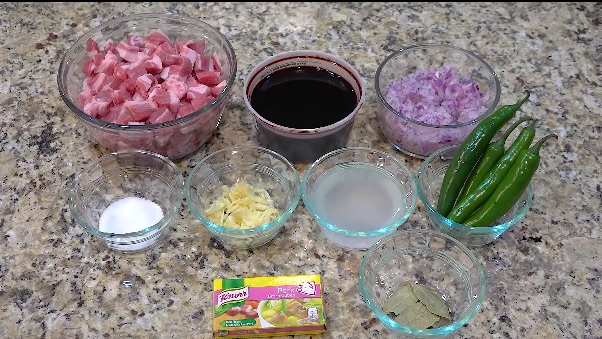
Ingredients for dinuguan.

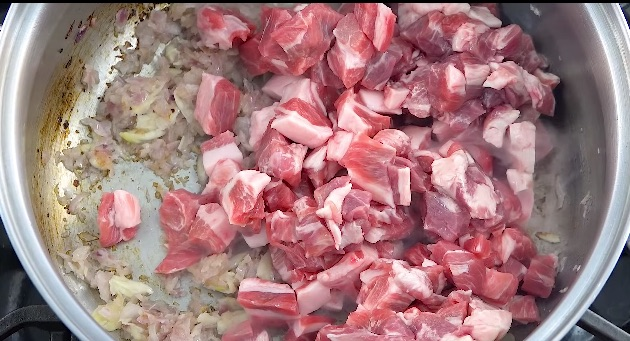
Pork is sautéed in garlic and onions until fragrant

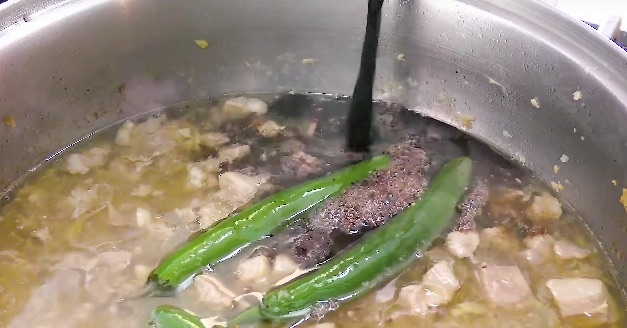
Addition of water, bay leaves, pepper, and blood to pot.

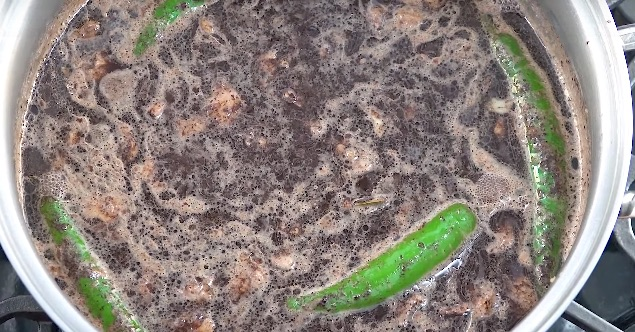
Dinuguan simmering

Dinuguan is typically made with pork, pork blood, peppers, onion, garlic, water, white vinegar, bay leaves and sugar. The onion is sautéed, then garlic and pork is added. Water is boiled in the same pot, then the bay leaves and vinegar are added. It is simmered until it is thick, then sugar, salt and black pepper is added.

== List of other regional variations ==
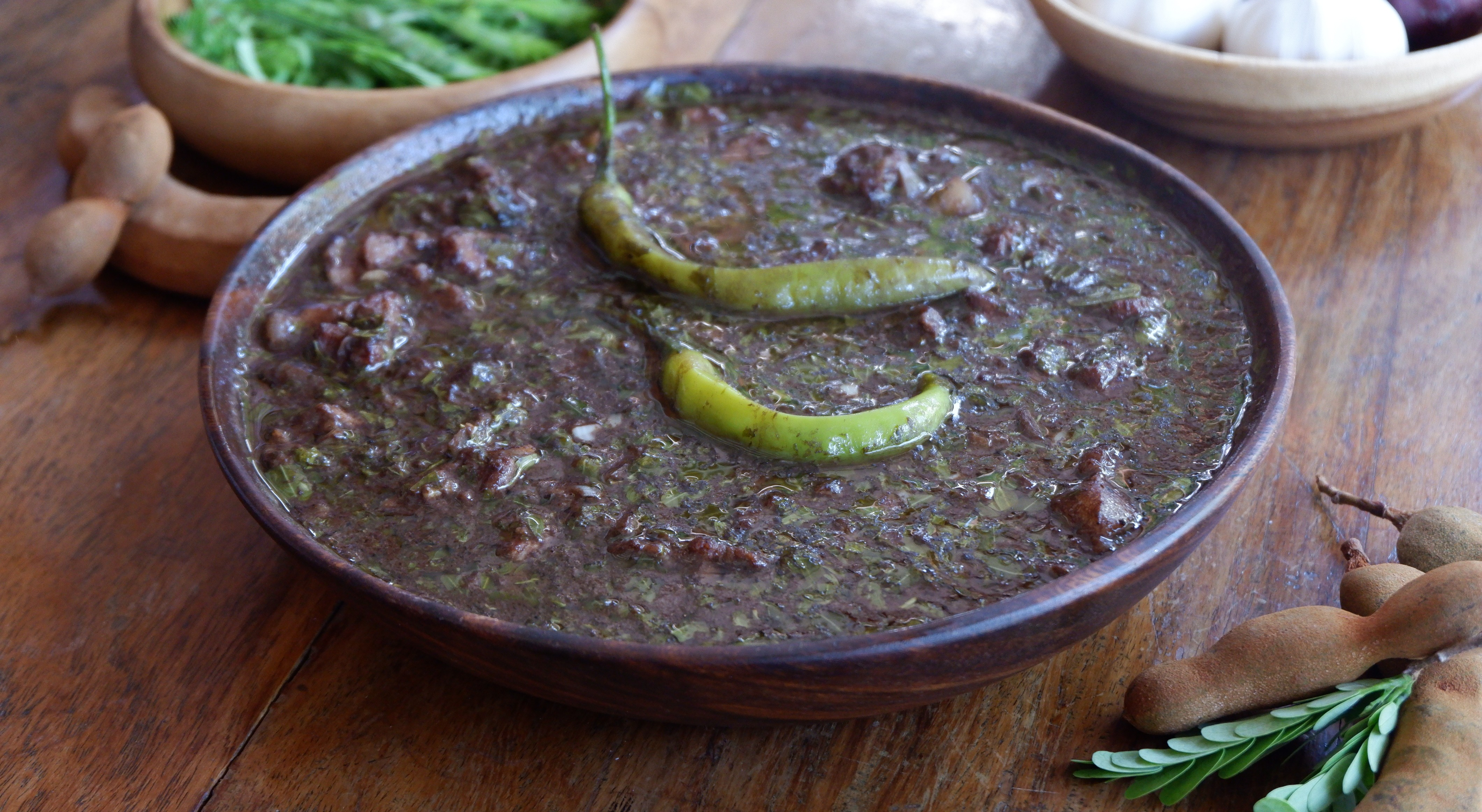
Tinumis from Nueva Ecija, which uses tamarind instead of vinegar as a souring agent

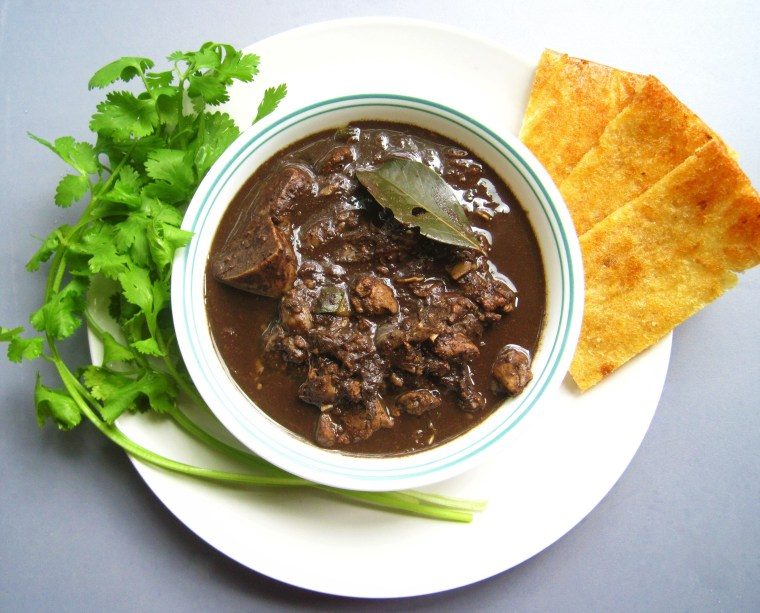
Paleo version of dinuguan

Other regional variants of dinuguan include:

- In Aklan, it is called dinuguan sa batwan, using the batwan fruit.
- In Bulacan, it is called serkele/sirkele, a specialty similar in ingredients to dinuguan but without pig's blood and using beef internal organs; soupy and on the sour side; other reports cow blood is used.
- In Bicol, it is called tinutungang dinuguan, meaning, it contains coconut milk and chilies; it is called such because coconut milk is added, and charcoal embers are used to cook the milk until curdling point at which it forms creamy reduction or latik.
- In Capiz, dinuguan na manok sa pinulipot nga abalong.
- In Cebu, dugo-dugo, which has itself many versions, with some adding cubes of solidified blood, just like in Pampanga's tid-tad, and other versions omitting the pork liver from the dish while the innards are chopped so finely down to the millimetre, so that the end result is a pork blood stew without the recognizable ingredients.
- In the Ilocos Region, dinuguan is known as dinardaraan in Ilocano, It is thicker and drier than most versions, with an oily and lightly vinegary taste derived from sukang Iloko (cane vinegar). It is usually cooked with pork offal and sometimes mixed with crispy pork such as bagnet called crispy dinardaraan, a version from San Nicolas. A chicken-based variation called sapsapuriket uses native chicken and has a lighter, brothier consistency. While in Ilocos Norte, it is called mollo, a brownish and watery version of dinuguan.
- In Laguna, dinuguang kalabaw, dinuguan using the more flavorful "carabeef".
- In Leyte (Southern), it is mixed with banana blossoms and pig's blood.
- In Marinduque, a local variant known as kari-kari is cooked with the same ingredients but is stewed until almost dry before the pork blood is added.
- In Masbate, it is called sinanglay, where they add tanglad (lemongrass).
- In Northern Mindanao, it is called sampayna or champayna and also uses lemongrass.
- In Nueva Ecija, Tinumis, is a soupy version which uses young tamarind leaves as a souring agent.
- In Pampanga, dinuguang puti, synonym for tidtad babi which is not black or brown unlike the usual dinuguan because the blood is torn into pieces by hand after it curdles.
- In Pangasinan, it is called baguisen; it uses kamias as a souring agent; the offal is washed with detergent then boiled in guava leaves to get rid of the smell; in Barangay Inirangan, Bayambang, they include upo slices in their baguisen.
- In Quezon Province, it is called pirihil, a dinuguan of chicken gizzard, heart and liver.
- In Visayas, called paklay, a Visayan blood stew of blood and intestine of goat, but a little bit drier.
- In Zamboanga/Basilan or Cavite (Chavacano), "Chavacano-style dinuguan", which uses tuba (sugar cane) vinegar and contains crushed oregano leaves.

== See also ==
- Black soup
- Black pudding
- Black sausage
- Blood sausage
- Blood as food
- Blood soup
- Cabidela
- Saksang
- Svartsoppa
