= Blood pudding =

Blood pudding may refer to:

- Black pudding, a blood sausage with a high proportion of oat or barley
- Blood sausage
- Pig blood curd, solidified pig's blood
- Sanguinaccio dolce, an Italian dessert made from pig's blood
- Tiết canh, a North Vietnamese blood pudding
