= Sang amb ceba =

Valencian blood dish

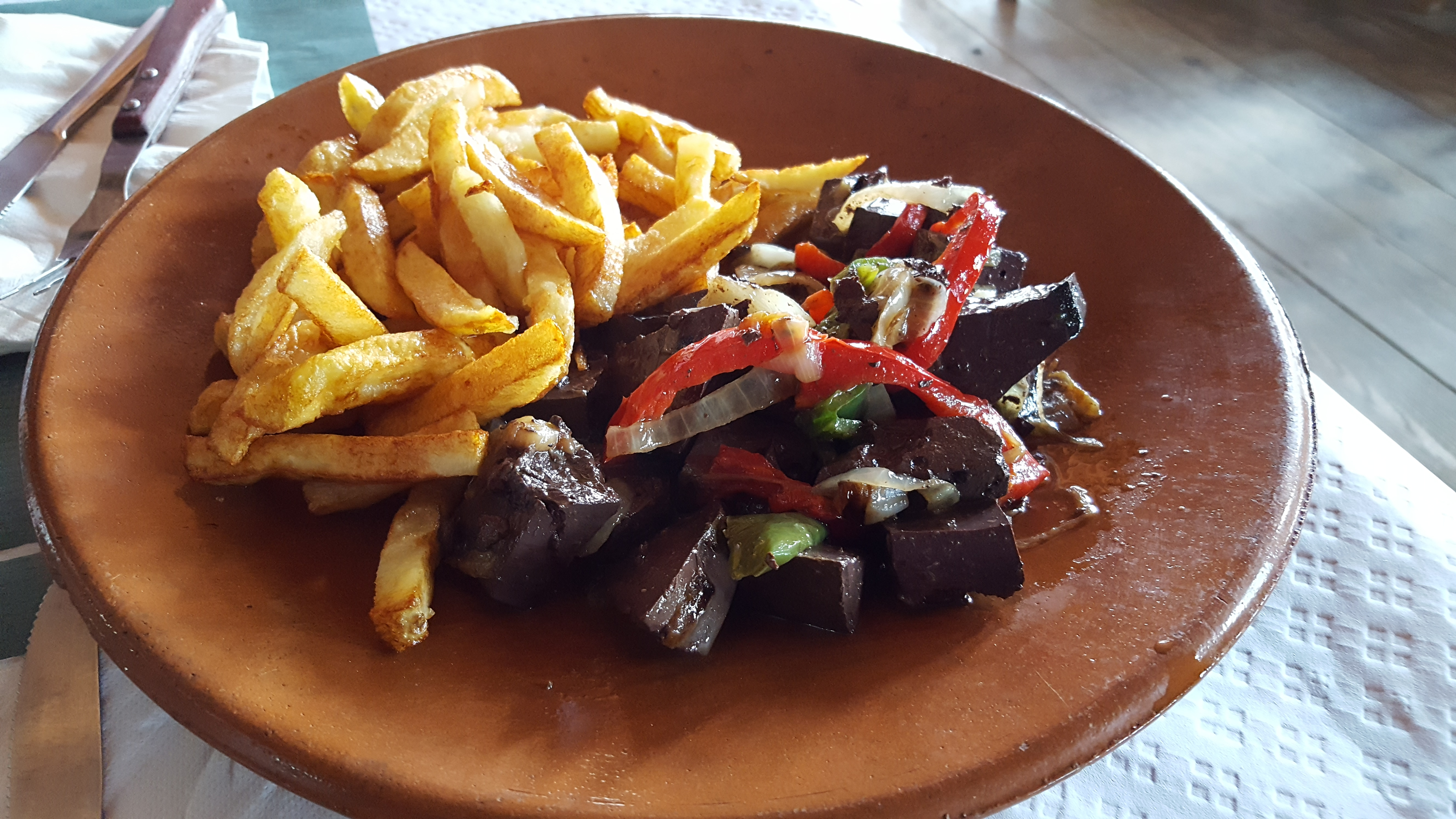
- Sang amb ceba (right), with fries
- Alternative names: Spanish: sangre con cebolla, sangre encebollada, fritanga de sangre
- Type: Blood dish
- Course: Tapas
- Region or state: Valencian Country
- Associated cuisine: Valencian cuisine
- Main ingredients: Blood curd, onion, pine nuts
- Similar dishes: Sangrecita

Sang amb ceba (Catalan, lit. 'blood with onions'; Spanish: sangre con cebolla, sangre encebollada, fritanga de sangre) is a blood dish from Valencian Country. Made from the eponymous blood curd and onion along with pine nuts and spices, particularly oregano, the dish is typically served as tapas. It is also served on a sandwich.

Sang amb ceba was traditionally prepared at two particular times throughout the year: for Easter in the spring, and during the traditional autumnal pig slaughter.

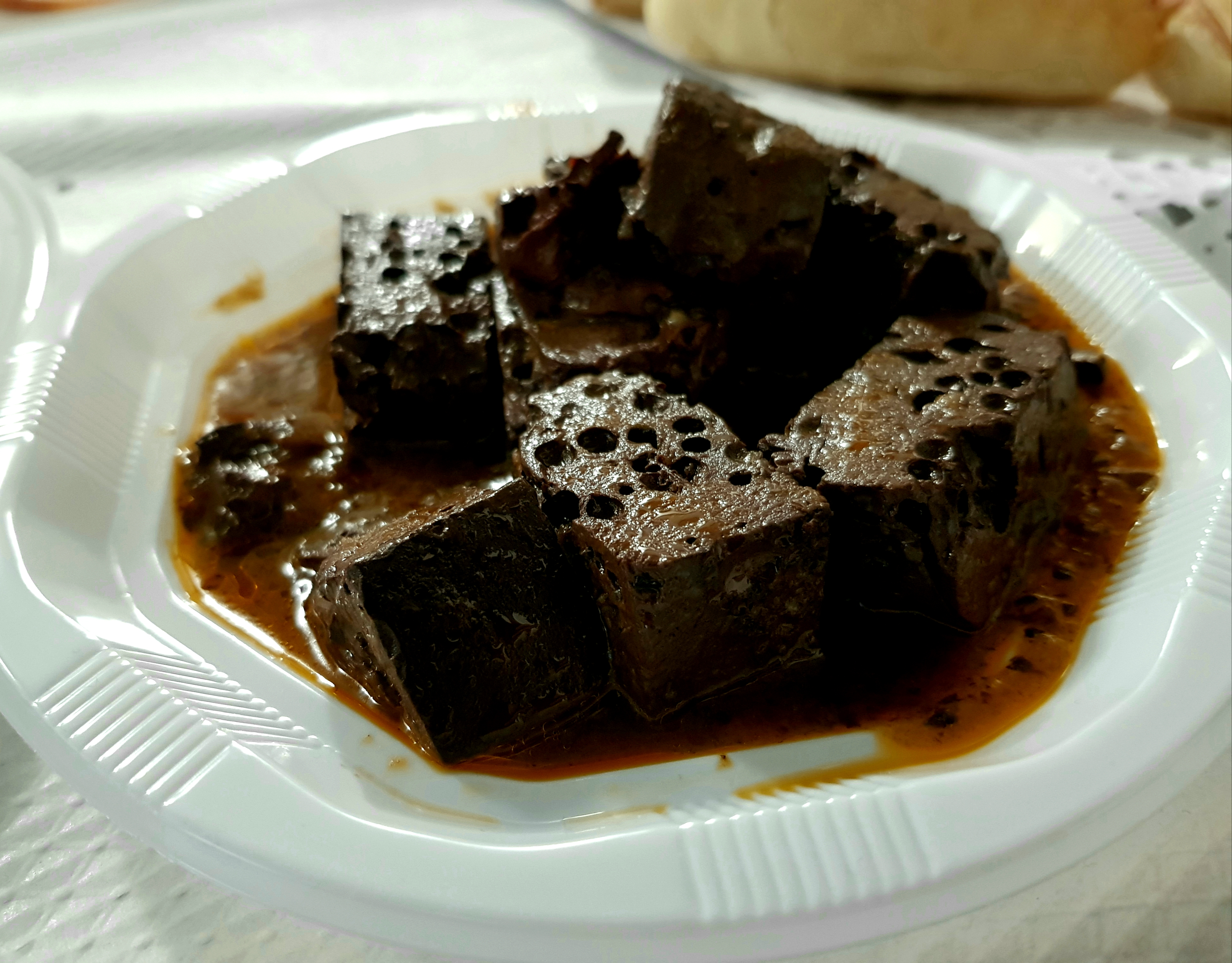
Sang amb ceba
