= Nachi =

Nachi may refer to:

- Nachi, Iran, a village in Kurdistan Province, Iran
- Nachi, Japan, now united with surrounding villages to form Nachikatsuura
- Japanese cruiser Nachi, a cruiser of the Imperial Japanese Navy, named after the place
- Nachi (worm), another name for the Welchia worm affecting Microsoft XP systems
- Ñachi or ñache, a Mapuche food from Chile, prepared with fresh animal blood and dressings
- Nachi-Fujikoshi Corp., a Japanese corporation known for its industrial robots, machining tools and systems and machine components.

== People with the given name ==
- Nachi Gordon, American entrepreneur
- Nachi Misawa (born 1989), Japanese rhythmic gymnast
- Nachi Nozawa (1938–2010), Japanese voice actor, actor and theatre director
