= Hematogen =

Nutrition bar containing cow's blood

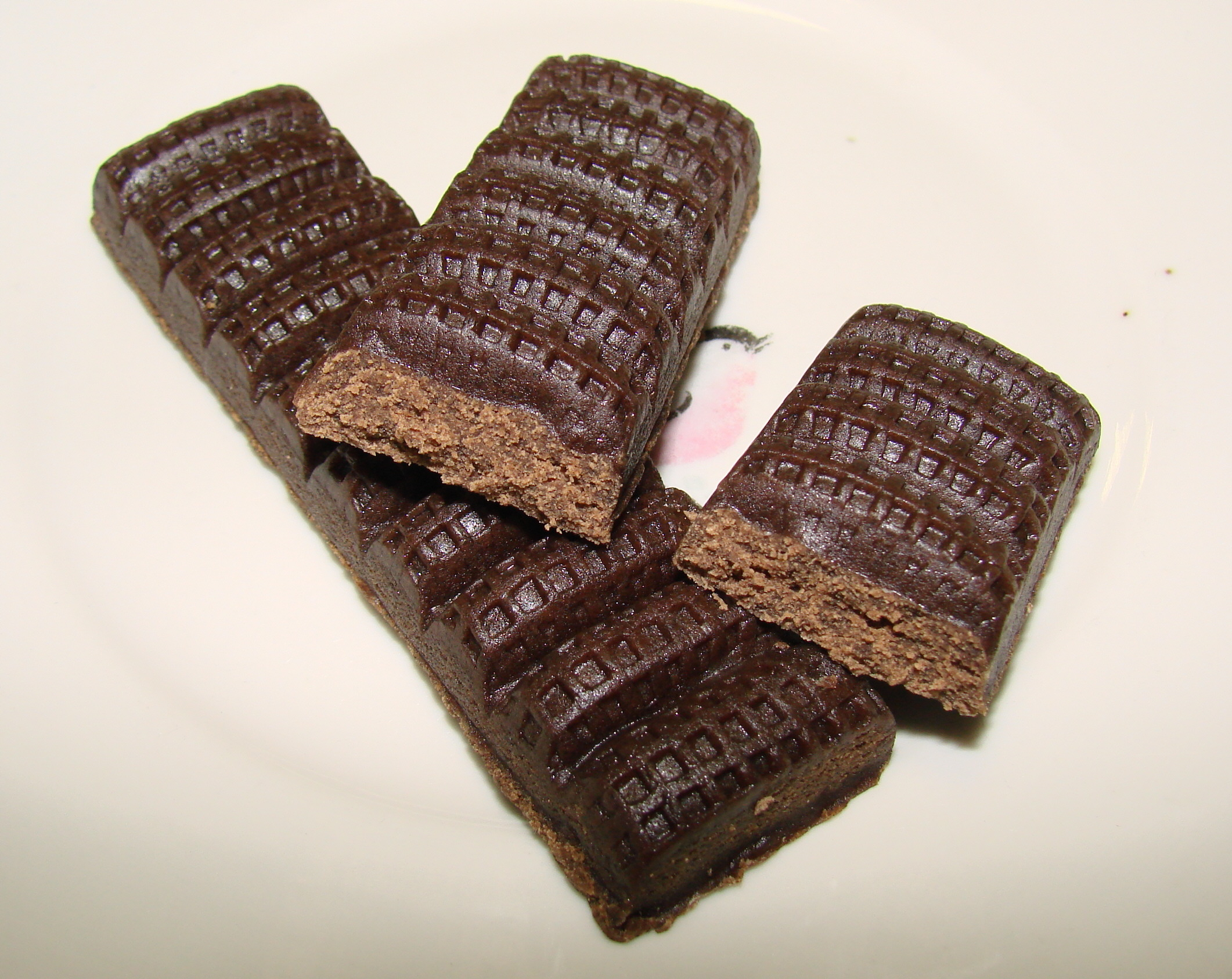
Bars of Hematogen

Hematogen (Russian: Гематоген) is a nutrition bar which is notable in that one of its main ingredients is serum albumin, extracted from the blood of cows. It was popular in the former Soviet Union. Chocolate is frequently mixed within it. Other ingredients may vary, but they usually contain sugar, condensed milk and vanillin.

It is often considered to be a medicinal product, and is used to treat or prevent low blood levels of iron and vitamin B12 (e.g., for anemia or during pregnancy). In the Soviet Union, it was available over-the-counter. They are still sold in Russia, Moldova, Belarus, Estonia, Lithuania, Latvia, Ukraine, Georgia and Kazakhstan.

== See also ==
- Doctor's sausage, a supposedly healthy low-fat Russian sausage
- Sanguinaccio dolce, a sweet pudding made with pig’s blood
- Protein bar
- Blood as food
- Black pudding
