= Eating blood =

Eating blood may refer to:

- Hematophagy, animals feeding on blood
- Blood as food, humans eating blood
