= Paltbröd =

Blood crispbread

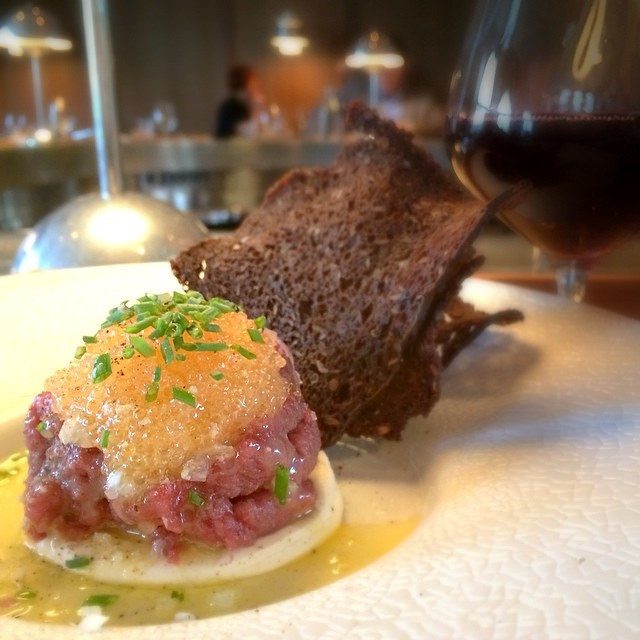
- Paltbröd with tartare and roe over clarified butter
- Type: Crispbread
- Place of origin: Sweden
- Region or state: Västergötland
- Associated cuisine: Swedish cuisine
- Main ingredients: Blood as food (pig, cow); rye flour

Paltbröd (Swedish for 'blood bread'; also blodbröd, palttunnbröd, paltkaka) is a variety of Swedish cuisine crispbread made with blood. Typically made with pig or cow blood, paltbröd is a traditional Swedish delicacy created as a way to maximize product from animal slaughter.

== Preparation and consumption ==
Paltbröd is made by kneading rye flour and wheat flour with blood - pig's or cow's - then baking the dough into a loaf. The loaf is then dried to preserve it, either over a fire in logs, or in rings set on rafters in the traditional crispbread manner. The dry loaf is made edible by boiling it in saltwater, making it soft enough to eat. Paltbröd is traditionally served with fried pork belly and onions, or with béchamel sauce.

Powdered paltbröd can be used as an iron supplement for baby food.

== History ==
Paltbröd is a dish that developed in Västergötland, made during times of animal slaughter: this time of year started at the traditional autumnal pig slaughter, through to Christmas in Sweden, and Shrove Tuesday in the early spring. The blood was baked into paltbröd to use as much of the animal as possible during harsh winters.

When the animals were slaughtered, the carcasses were exsanguinated immediately into a vessel sat in the snow: this allowed for the blood to be whisked to remove any floating fibers, and preserved the blood until it could be baked into paltbröd in one batch. The butcher was usually given paltbröd as a part of their reward.

Paltbröd was a Swedish-culture home cooking recipe in the 20th century, but has become increasingly rare; Swedish industrial bakery Bageri Skogaholm made commercially available paltbröd until cancelling production in 2008.

== See also ==
- Blodpalt, Scandinavian blood dumplings
- Blodplättar, Scandinavian blood pancakes
- Svartbröd, Aland cuisine black bread
