= Moronga =

Sausage dish

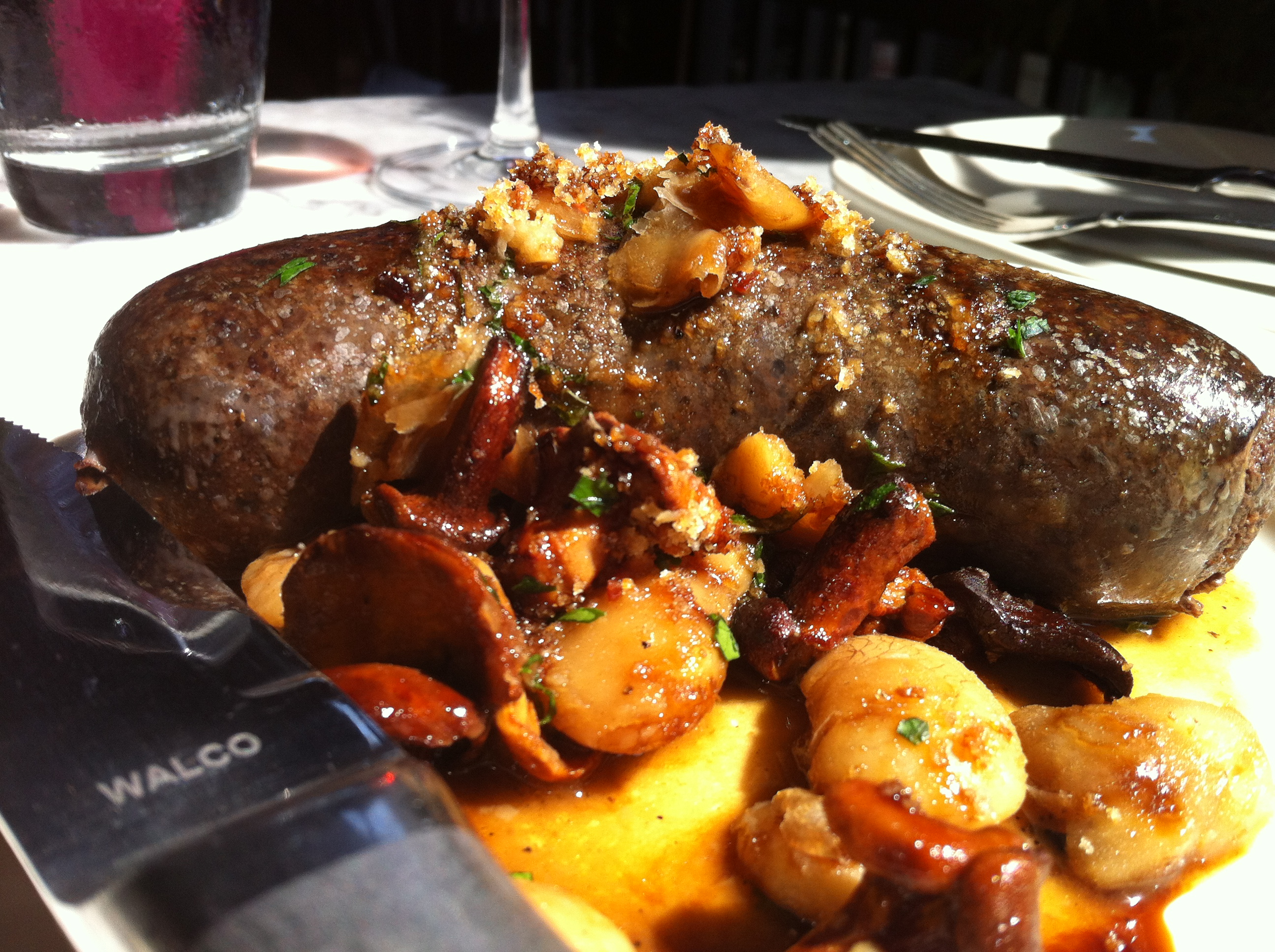
Moronga

Moronga (also called rellena, morcilla, or mbusia) is a kind of blood sausage. It is found in Uruguayan, Argentine, Cuban, Ecuador, Colombian, Puerto Rican, Central American (El Salvador, Belize, Guatemala, Honduras, Nicaragua, Panama and Costa Rica), Mexican, and Paraguayan cuisine.

Spices, herbs (such as ruta, oregano, and mint), onions, and chili peppers are added and then boiled for several hours in casing made of a pig's large intestines. It is served in a sauce, either chile rojo or chile verde. It is also served in central Mexico as a filling in gorditas and tacos after it has been pan-fried with fresh onions and jalapeño peppers. This sausage is called morcilla in the Yucatán Peninsula, and it is almost always served along with other sausages (buche) and a mix of pickled onion, cilantro, and spices.

== See also ==
- Black pudding
- Blood as food
- List of sausages
