= Czernina =

Polish soup made of duck blood and poultry broth

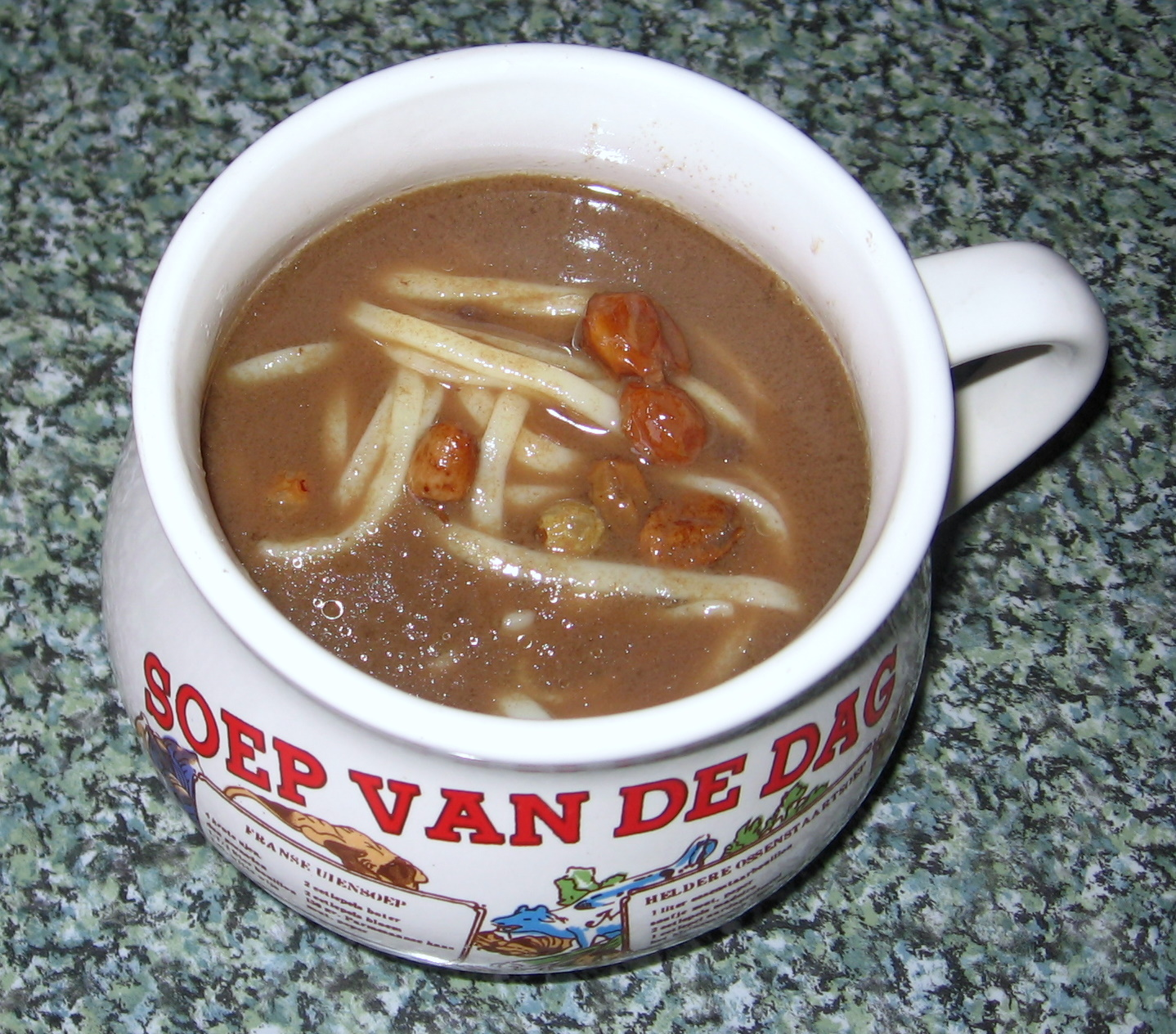
- Alternative names: Jusznik, czarnina, czarna polewka
- Type: Blood soup
- Place of origin: Poland
- Main ingredients: Blood (traditionally duck, alternatively: chicken, rabbit, pig), poultry broth

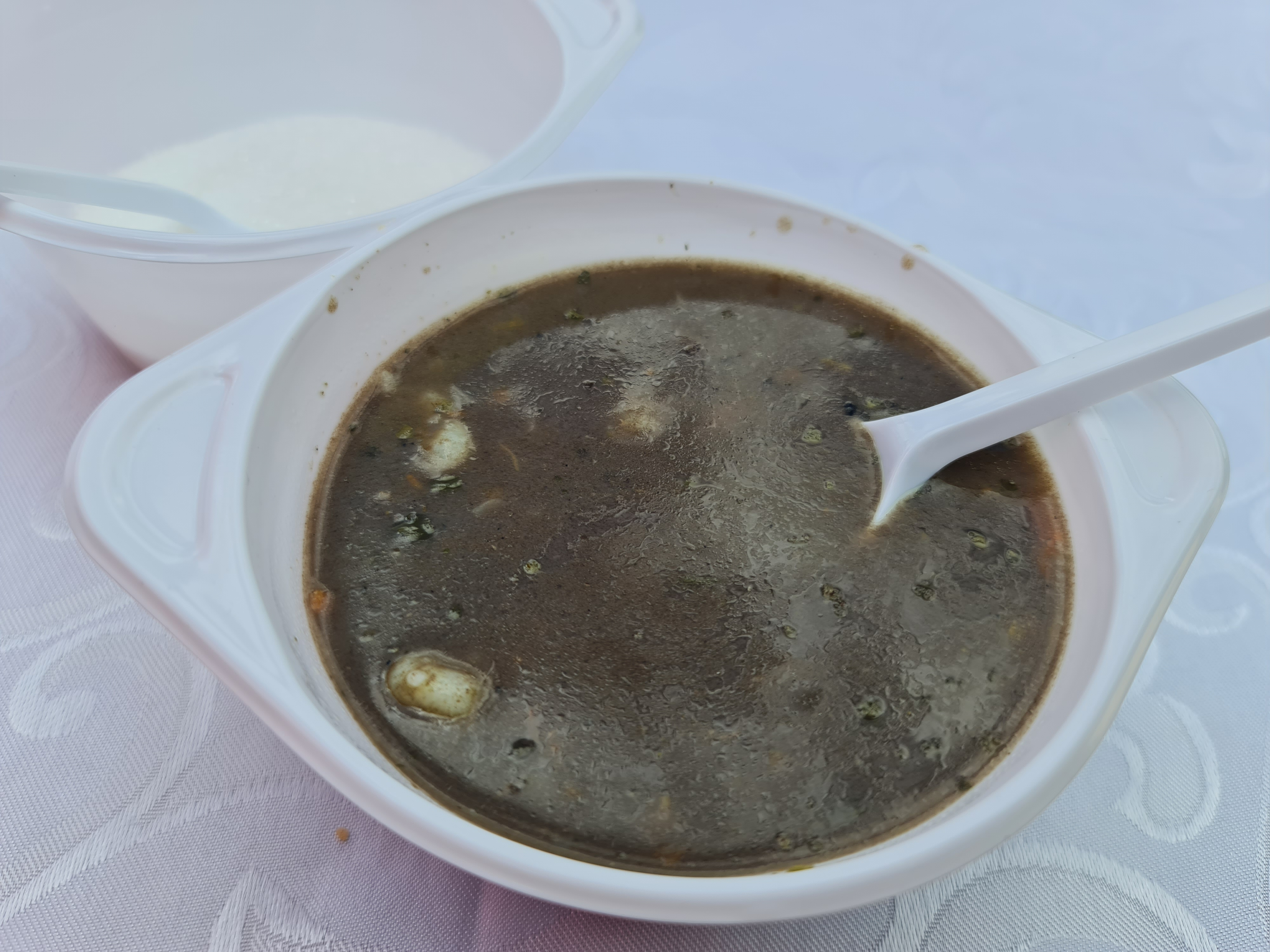

Czernina (Polish pronunciation: [t͡ʂɛrˈɲina], from czarny – "black"; also spelled czarnina or czarna polewka – "black soup") is a Polish soup traditionally made of duck blood and clear poultry broth. Rabbit or pig blood can also be used as alternatives. In English it can be called "duck blood soup".

== Flavours ==
Generally the sweet and sour taste of the soup comes from the balance of sugar and vinegar. However, there are hundreds of recipes popular in different parts of Poland, Belarus and Lithuania. Among the ingredients used are plum or pear syrup, dried pears, plums or cherries, apple vinegar and honey. Like most Polish soups, czernina is usually served with kluski, fine noodles, macaroni, boiled potatoes, or dumplings.

== Symbol ==
Until the 19th century czernina was also a symbol in Polish culture. It was served to young men applying for the hand of their beloved. If the suitor was rejected, he would be served czernina. It is a plot element in Pan Tadeusz, a famous Polish epic poem by Adam Mickiewicz.

It is also a regional dish in Kashubia, Masuria and Poznań.

Czernina is very similar to Swedish svartsoppa.

== See also ==
- Blood as food
- Duck blood and vermicelli soup
- Chicken and duck blood soup
- List of duck dishes
- List of soups
- Polish cuisine
- Tiết canh, a Vietnamese dish of raw duck blood
