= Malnutrition in Peru =

Malnutrition is a condition that affects bodily capacities of an individual, including growth, pregnancy, lactation, resistance to illness, and cognitive and physical development. Malnutrition is commonly used in reference to undernourishment, or a condition in which an individual's diet does not include sufficient calories and proteins to sustain physiological needs, but it also includes overnourishment, or the consumption of excess calories.

Other terms exist to describe the specific effects of malnutrition on the body. Stunting refers to low height for age with reference to a population of healthy children. It is an indicator of chronic malnutrition, and high stunting levels are associated with poor socioeconomic conditions and a greater risk of exposure to adverse conditions such as illness. Wasting refers to low weight for height with reference to a population of healthy children. In most cases, it reflects a recent and acute weight loss associated with famine or disease.

UNICEF statistics collected between 2008 and 2012 indicate that the level of stunting in Peru is 19.5%. The percentage of the population that is underweight is 4.1%, and 9.8% of the population is overweight. The physical effects of stunting are permanent, as children are unlikely to regain the loss in height and corresponding weight. Stunting can also have adverse effects on cognitive development, school performance, adult productivity and income, and maternal reproductive outcome. The problem of stunting is most prevalent in the highland and jungle regions of Peru, disproportionately affecting rural areas within these regions.

== Causes ==
Major causes of malnutrition in Peru include food insecurity, diet, poverty, and agricultural productivity, with a combination of factors contributing to individual cases. Other causes of malnutrition include: reduced dietary intake, reduced absorption of macro and/or micro-nutrients, increased losses or altered requirements, and an increase in energy expenditure.

Poverty plays a major factor in malnutrition because of the deprivations associated with it. A study conducted by the Pan American Health Organization (PAHO) reported that children in the poorest 20% of Peruvian households had an eight-fold risk of dying from malnutrition than children from the richest 20%. Families living under poverty have limited access to healthy, nutritious foods. Additionally, access to clean water and sanitation services may be restricted due to poor living conditions, which increases the risk of infection transmission. Low school attendance rates means that children are excluded from school feeding programs.

=== Rural-urban disparity ===
Infant mortality in Peru was on average much higher (42.1 per 1,000) from 1995 to 2000 than in other Latin American countries. The prevalence of poverty, mortality and malnutrition vary by geographic regions. Three distinct geographic zones make up Peru: the Pacific coastal area, the Selva, lowland jungle of the Amazon River basin and the Sierra, Andean highlands. is divided into three major geographic zones. Richer and more developed cities like Lima are located in the Pacific coastal are. The Selva includes an array of forest areas and their inhabitants are scattered throughout the area. It is difficult to access them due to geography and climate. In the Andean highlands, 73% of the population live below the poverty line and 40% of them live in extreme poverty, most of whom belong to indigenous populations.

A study by Van de Poel et al. found that the proportion of under-5 stunting in urban Peru was 0.18 and 0.47 in rural Peru, with an absolute difference of 0.29. Among the 47 developing countries surveyed for the study, Peru had the greatest rural- urban disparity in stunting rates. One cause of the disparity could be the effectiveness of public expenditures in reaching target groups in rural and urban areas, as public spending only had a positive impact in children's nutrition outcomes in urban regions. However, even in urban regions, there is a nutritional disparity among children of varying socioeconomic statuses due to barriers in place that limit indigenous and poorer children's access to public services.

Infant mortality in rural areas was 53 per 1,000, compared to 27 per 1,000 in urban areas and 14 percent of children are malnourished in urban areas, compared to 46 percent in rural areas.

== Effects ==
Malnutrition can cause physical, cognitive, and developmental problems, oftentimes irreversible and permanent. According to UNICEF, 30% of children below five years of age in Peru are stunted, and 18% are underweight. Food intake reductions can affect the growth of cytokines, glucocorticoids, and insulin. When levels of food intake are low for a long period, our bodies begin to draw on tissues such as muscle, adipose and bones, significantly affecting our body formation and growth.

=== Health and productivity ===
One third of child deaths in Peru can be attributed to undernutrition, often because the existing state exacerbates disease. In response to infectious diseases, the body's immune system activates, requiring increased energy consumption. Individuals who are undernourished fail to consume the minimum amount of calories necessary for baseline physiological needs, much less a full immunological response. The quality of life is highly impacted by the regional differences in the country. There is a great of variation among living condition, socioeconomic status, and accessibility to healthcare. Thus, malnourished individuals are more susceptible to infection and are less able to fight diseases. Additionally, low birth weight and stunted children are also at a greater risk of chronic diseases like heart disease and diabetes than healthy children.

Micronutrient deficiencies are prevalent in Peru and impact human well-being. The World Health Organization (WHO) found that 15% of preschoolers in Peru were deficient in vitamin A. They also found that the levels of anemia in preschoolers and pregnant women were respectively 50% and 43% in Peru. Anemia is a condition linked with iron deficiency, which is linked to an increased risk of maternal mortality and impaired cognitive development in children.

== History ==
Government intervention to improve nutritional health began in the seventies with the creation of the National Office for Food Support (ONAA) in 1972, an organization that primarily handled donations from overseas aid groups. During the 1980s, the government expanded its role in food assistance with the creation of the Direct Assistance Program (PAD) for employment-based food aid for and the Vaso de Leche (VL) for young children under six years old. By the 1990s, many food assistance initiatives and programs existed under different government agencies. The ONAA and PAD offices merged to form the National Program for Food Assistance (PRONAA), controlled by the Office of the Presidency (Office of the Prime Minister).

During the 1980s the government began to take a more active role in food security for its citizens, creating the Direct Assistance Program (Programa de Asistencia Directra- PAD) for employment-based food assistance and the Glass of Milk Program (Vaso de Leche) to benefit children under 6 years old.

Starting in the 1990s food assistance programs began to become more centralized, with the National Office for Food Support and the Direct Assistance Program becoming merged into the National Program for Food Assistance, which was put under direct control of the Office of the Prime Minister.

However, during this time NGOs and other non-governmental organized efforts were still very important to the food network of Peru, exemplified by the Comedores Populares. These were neighborhood organizations initially started by churches or NGOs that eventually became supervised by the National Program for Food Assistance with the purpose of feeding the local population. In 1994 there were approximately 5,000 Comdedores Populares organizations in the Lima Metropolitan Area with more than 13,000 other nationwide, almost half of them were self-managed.

By 2002, Peru was spending $220 million on food and nutrition interventions per year, however the efforts remained insufficient to further reduce child stunting rates. The failure to further reduce stunting rates was attributed to the lack of coordination and integration of the many different food programs, mostly Vaso de Leche, Commedores Populares, and Desayunos Escolares (a school feeding program established in 1966), "stunting rates declined from 36.5 per cent to 25.8 per cent between 1992 and 1996 but then flattened for the next ten years." Many of these programs had poor targeting, low access and usage, and inadequate funding schemes.

Despite the number of government aid groups targeting malnutrition and food accessibility, rates of chronic malnutrition did not significantly decrease during the 1900s. The urban rate of child chronic malnutrition in 1996 was 25.8%, which dropped to 22.9% in 2005. In rural populations, the child chronic malnutrition rate was 40.4% in 1996 and only dropped 0.3% by 2005. A study conducted by Mendizabal and Vasquez examined the public budget on children from 1990 to 2000. They found that much of the budgeted money failed to reach the extreme poor and the geographically isolated, such as individuals living in remote, rural villages. There was high leakage in food and nutrition programs; more than US$1.2 billion was spent on this between 1996 and 2000 to yield a 1% decrease in the level chronic malnutrition in children under five.

Thus, Peru switched its intervention strategies following a new administration in 2001 that focused on the right to food as a right, resulting in 2007 with the establishment of the CRECER program. This was the National Strategy CRECER was created through an Executive Decree in 2007, as a "coordinated poverty reduction strategy that articulates all public offices in the National, Regional and Local Government, as well as the private sector, international cooperation and civil society in general, to promote, facilitate and execute poverty reduction and human development goals." The CRECER program stressed central points of going beyond food distribution and include elements such as sanitation, training, cooking programs, access to clean water, and conditional cash transfer programs such as JUNTOS to alleviate malnutrition, to promote integration of programs, to decentralize the scope of interventions, and to adequately fund policy interventions. There are three main axis to the CRECER program: (1) the development of human capabilities and respect of fundamental rights, (2) the promotion of opportunities and economic capacities, and (3) the establishment of a social protection network.

The Child Nutrition Initiative was another program. It started in 2006 and is an advocacy agency that was formed from the integration of existing NGOs and government agencies to promote good policies for healthcare, education, housing, and public financing. Some of the programs that were integrated into the Child Nutrition Initiative included: Action Against Hunger, UN Population Fund, CARE Peru, World Food Program, and USAID. The CNI offered a coordinated space where differing agencies working resolve malnutrition could work together, this space also allowed the funding and donations to fight malnutrition to unify under what works and avoid fragmented efforts that did not reach all people.

The CNI plays a key role in asserting the main goal of poverty alleviation was nutrition focused, establishing a coordination agency that could direct technical and financial donations from different agencies, and serve as a public platform where government led malnutrition reduction efforts could be debated on a national level. The CNI serves another purpose of advocating for presidents and regional elected officials to keep their promise to reducing malnutrition, establishing long-term commitment from these leaders.

=== Vaso de Leche program ===
The Vaso de Leche (VL), or Glass of Milk, program is the largest social assistance program in Peru, with an annual budget of US$97 million in 2001, reaching over 3 million people, or 44% of households with young children. In December 1984, around 25,000 women marched the streets of Lima to demand that children have the legal right to a glass of milk a day, because milk is often believed to be a commodity that meets the body's nutritional needs. A month later, the government responded with Law 20459, laying the foundation for the Vaso de Leche program. The government chose to use milk as an in-kind benefit because it is assumed to contain an excessive amount of nutrients. The Glass of Milk program disburses a substantial amount of milk resources primarily to poor households with low nutritional status. The program was introduced in Lima in 1984 and expanded in 1998.

Money is distributed to Peru's 1,608 local municipalities by the Ministry of Economy and Finance. Each municipality is required to have an administrative committee of elected representatives. In addition to milk and milk substitutes, the program also distributes cereals and other commodities. The primary target group consists of households with children under the age of seven and pregnant or lactating mothers. Secondary beneficiaries include families with children up to twelve years of age, the elderly, and individuals with tuberculosis.

A study conducted in 2006 sought to evaluate the impact of the VL program on child nutritional outcomes. The authors collected data from VL monthly program expenditures, VL Public Expenditure Tracking Survey, Demographic and Health Surveys from 1996 and 2000, and national household living standard surveys with information about participation in the VL program and child measurements. They examined the distribution of VL transfers at each quintile of income and calculated the intent-to-treat estimates of impact based on the value of the transfers. Calculations were controlled for household factors. They found that the VL transfers were targeted more toward lower quintile households, with the poorest 40% receiving three times as much aid as the richest 20%. From 1996 to 2000, the stunting rate among children decreased by 0.2%, from 26% to 25.8%, a statistically insignificant decrease. The study concluded that the VL program was effective at targeting households with low income or malnourished children, but it made no positive impact on reducing child stunting.

=== JUNTOS conditional cash transfers ===
Peru's conditional cash transfer program commenced in 2005, aiming to reduce poverty and promote better education and health practices. Eligible households must comply with conditions that include accessing basic public services for their children in order to receive a monthly cash transfer of US$30. The program targets impoverished households with children under the age of 14, and transfers are given to mothers. The agreement includes the completion of vaccination charts and pre and post-natal health check-ups, as well as using the National Nutritional Assistance Program package for children under three years old, which includes using chlorinated water and anti-parasite medicine. The program aims to focus more on addressing malnutrition in children, encouraging families to use the transfers to purchase more high protein foods. A study conducted by Perova and Vakis revealed that the program increased spending on food categories such as breads and cereals, vegetables, fruits, and tubers among participating households compared to a control group. The evidence suggests that more nutritious calories were consumed as a result of the cash transfers. Despite improving diets and increasing health service utilization, the JUNTOS program has not been able to affect final outcome indicators of nutrition. There were increases in per capita spending, food expenditure, decreases in severity and poverty gap, increases in school attendance and reductions of school dropout. However, no significant results were found in most indicators of prenatal health, child health, or chronic malnutrition.

== See also ==
- Epidemiology of malnutrition
- Malnutrition
