= Sagol =

Beef leg bone in Korean cuisine

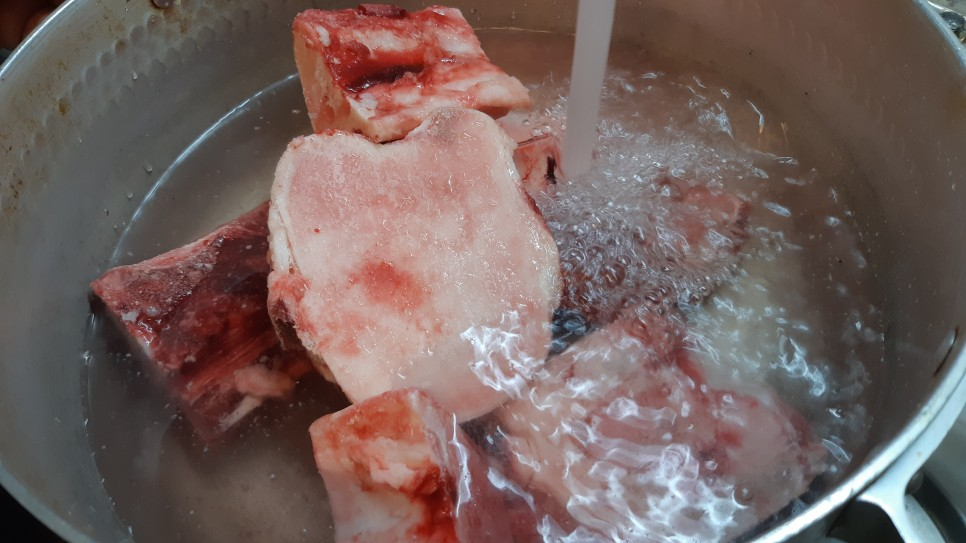
- Hanu sagol
- Place of origin: Korea
- Associated cuisine: Korean cuisine
- Main ingredients: Beef leg bones

Korean name
- Hangul: 사골
- Hanja: 四骨
- RR: sagol
- MR: sagol
- IPA: [sa.ɡol]

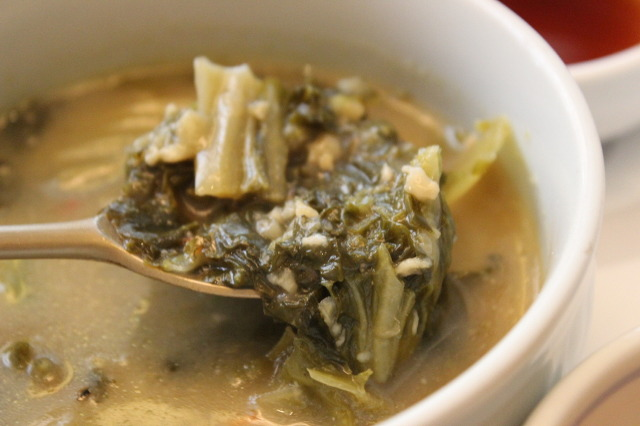
Korean dish 'Sagol-ugeoji-guk' using sagol

Sagol (Korean: 사골; Hanja: 四骨), or beef leg bone, is an ingredient in Korean cuisine. Sagol is often boiled to make a broth, called sagol-yuksu (사골육수; 四骨肉水), or beef leg bone broth, for Korean soups such as gomguk (beef bone soup), galbi-tang (short rib soup), tteokguk (sliced rice cake soup), kal-guksu (noodle soup), or gukbap (soup with rice).

Sagol is rich in the protein collagen and in minerals such as calcium. In traditional Korean culture, it is believed to reinvigorate the body. However, no scientific evidence supports this claim. In the summer, sagol-yuksu (broth) is served to pregnant or breastfeeding mothers and the sick. In the winter, it is served with rice as a warm and nutritious meal.

== Etymology ==
The anglicized translation of the word Sagol roughly translates to Four Bones. 'Sa' meaning four and 'Gol' meaning bone. Together, they refer to the thigh and shin bones of a cow or bull. The term is primarily used in cooking.

== Anatomy ==
Cattle have eight sagol bones. Sagol uses the thigh and shin bones from a cow's four legs. Sagol can be classified by breed (hanu, beef cattle, dairy cattle, imported, etc.), sex (cow, bull, steer, etc.), or grade. High-grade sagol from hanu beef with a dense ivory and white bone cross-section is typically preferred. A sagol consists of one diaphysis part and two epiphysis parts. The Epiphysis parts have an outer layer of compact bone and an inner layer of spongy bone. The diaphysis contains periostea outside and marrow inside.

== See also ==
- Beef shank
- Ham hock
- Long bone
- Oxtail
