= Blood as food =

Human consumption of blood

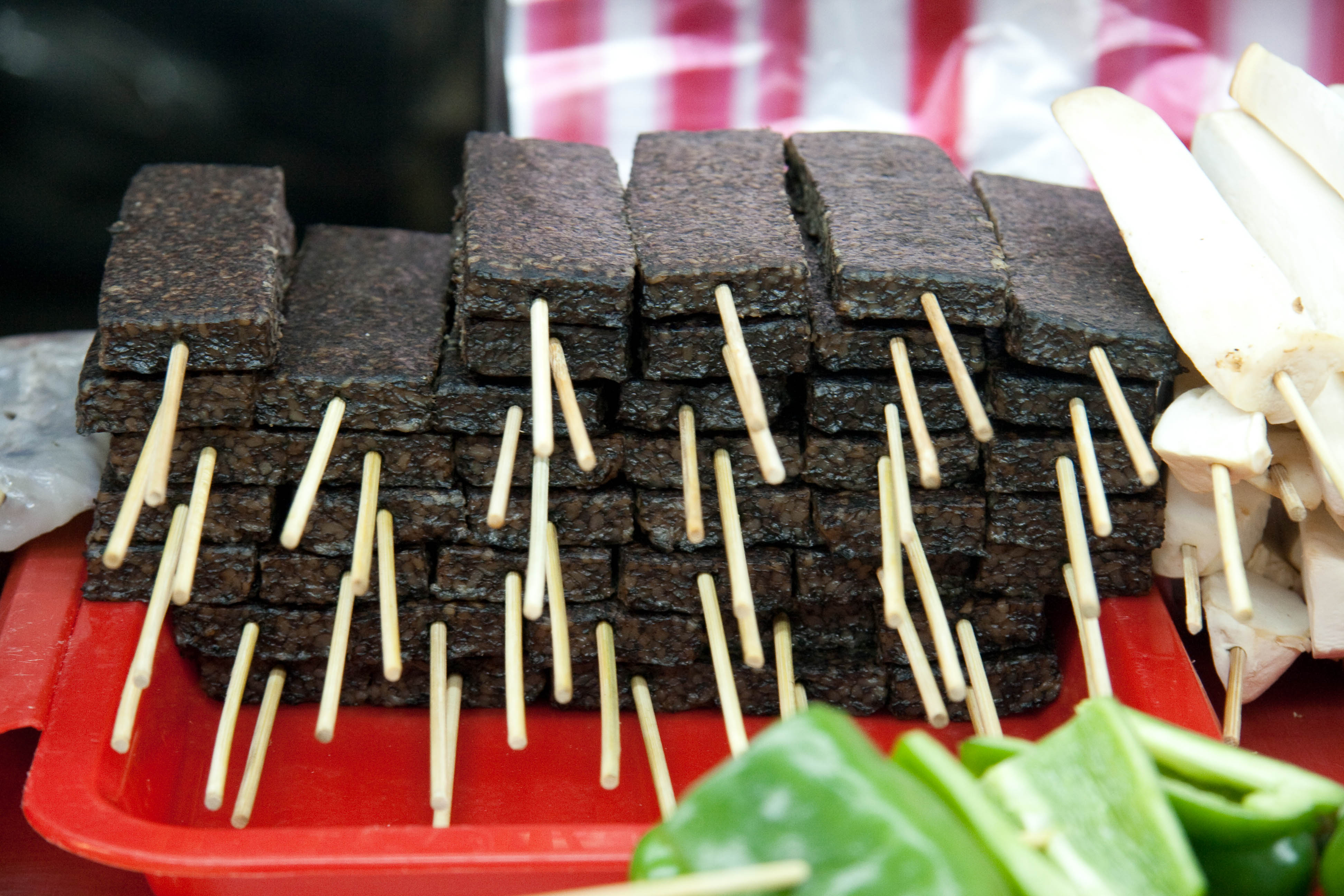
- Pig's blood cakes
- Place of origin: Various
- Main ingredients: Animal blood

Blood is used as food in many religions and cultures, often in combination with meat. The blood may be in the form of blood sausage or other solidified form, as a thickener for sauces, a cured salted form for times of food scarcity, or in a blood soup. This is a product from domesticated animals, obtained at a place and time where the blood can run into a container and be swiftly consumed or processed. In many cultures, the animal is slaughtered. In some cultures and religions, blood is a taboo food.

Blood consists predominantly of protein and water, and is sometimes called "liquid meat" because its composition is similar to that of lean meat. Blood collected hygienically can be used for human consumption; otherwise it is converted to blood meal. Certain fractions of animal blood are used in human medicine.

== Methods of preparation ==
=== Blood sausage ===
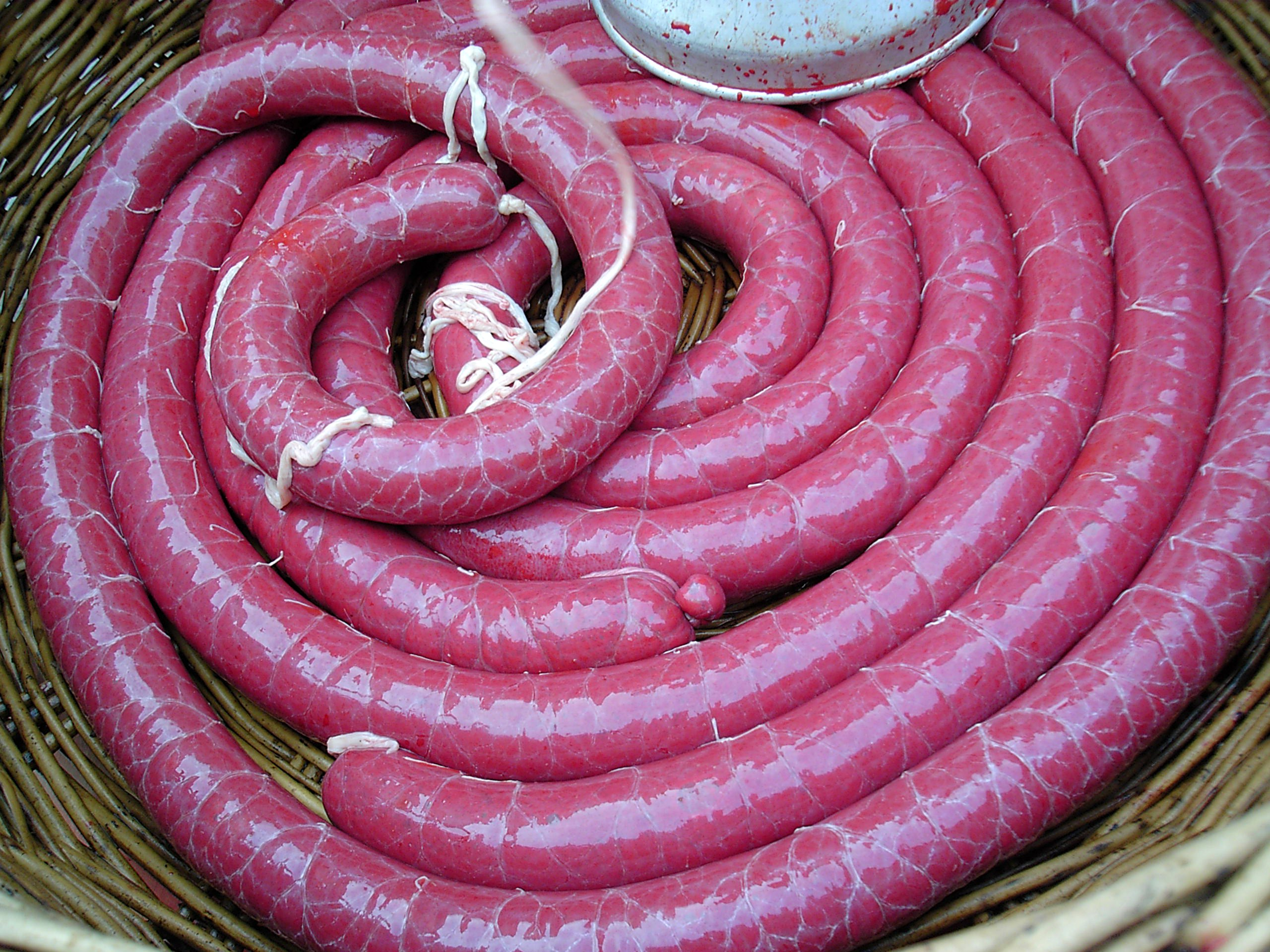
Fresh, uncooked blood sausage

Blood sausage is any sausage made by cooking animal blood with a filler until it is thick enough to congeal when cooled. Pig or cattle blood is most often used. Typical fillers include meat, fat, suet, bread, rice, barley and oatmeal. Varieties include biroldo, black pudding, blood tongue, blutwurst, drisheen, kishka (kaszanka), morcilla, moronga, mustamakkara, sundae, verivorst, and many types of boudin.

=== Pancakes ===
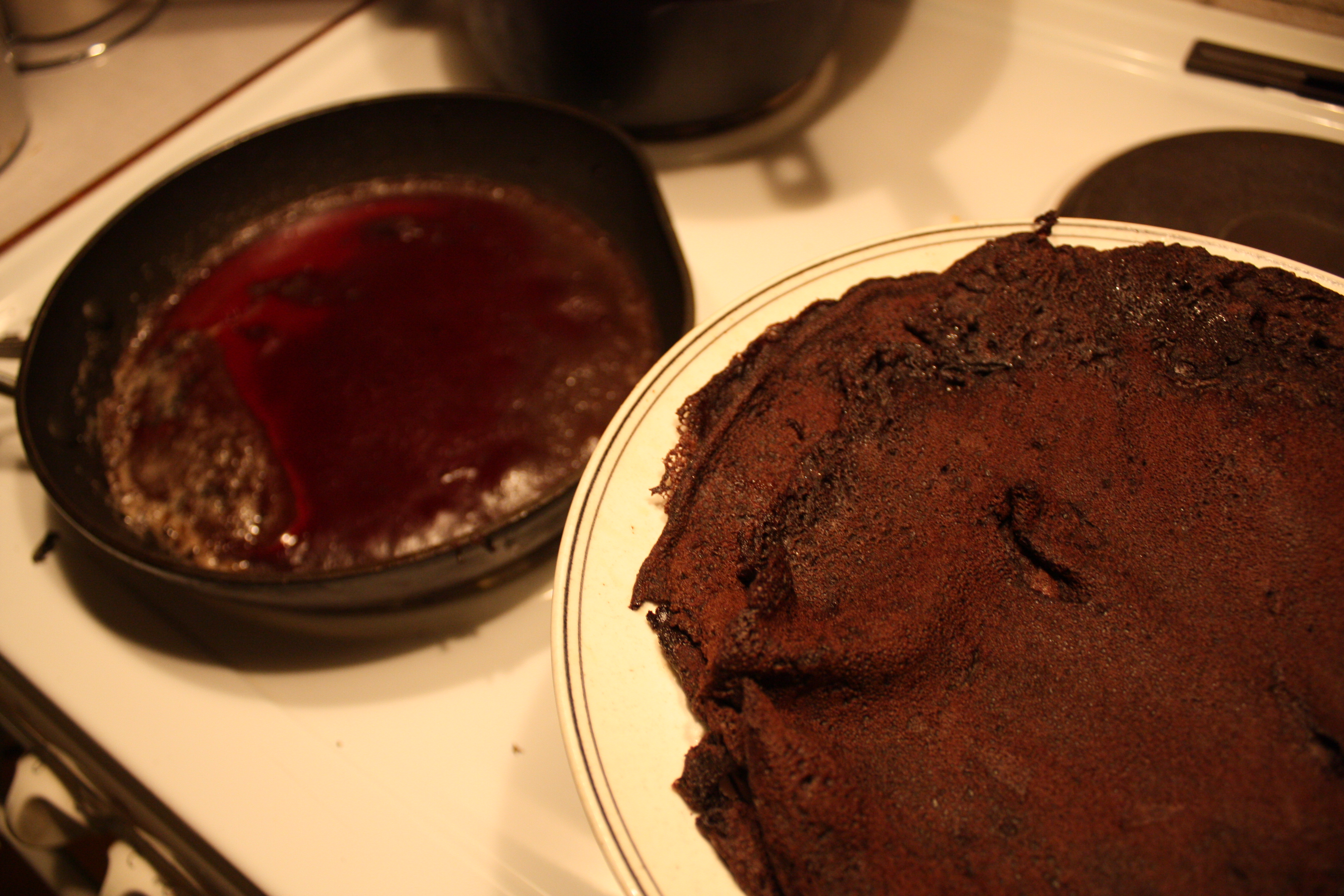
Blodplättar, blood pancakes from Sweden

Blood pancakes are encountered in Galicia (filloas), Scandinavia, and the Baltic; for example, Swedish blodplättar, Finnish veriohukainen, and Estonian veripannkoogid.

=== Soups, stews and sauces ===
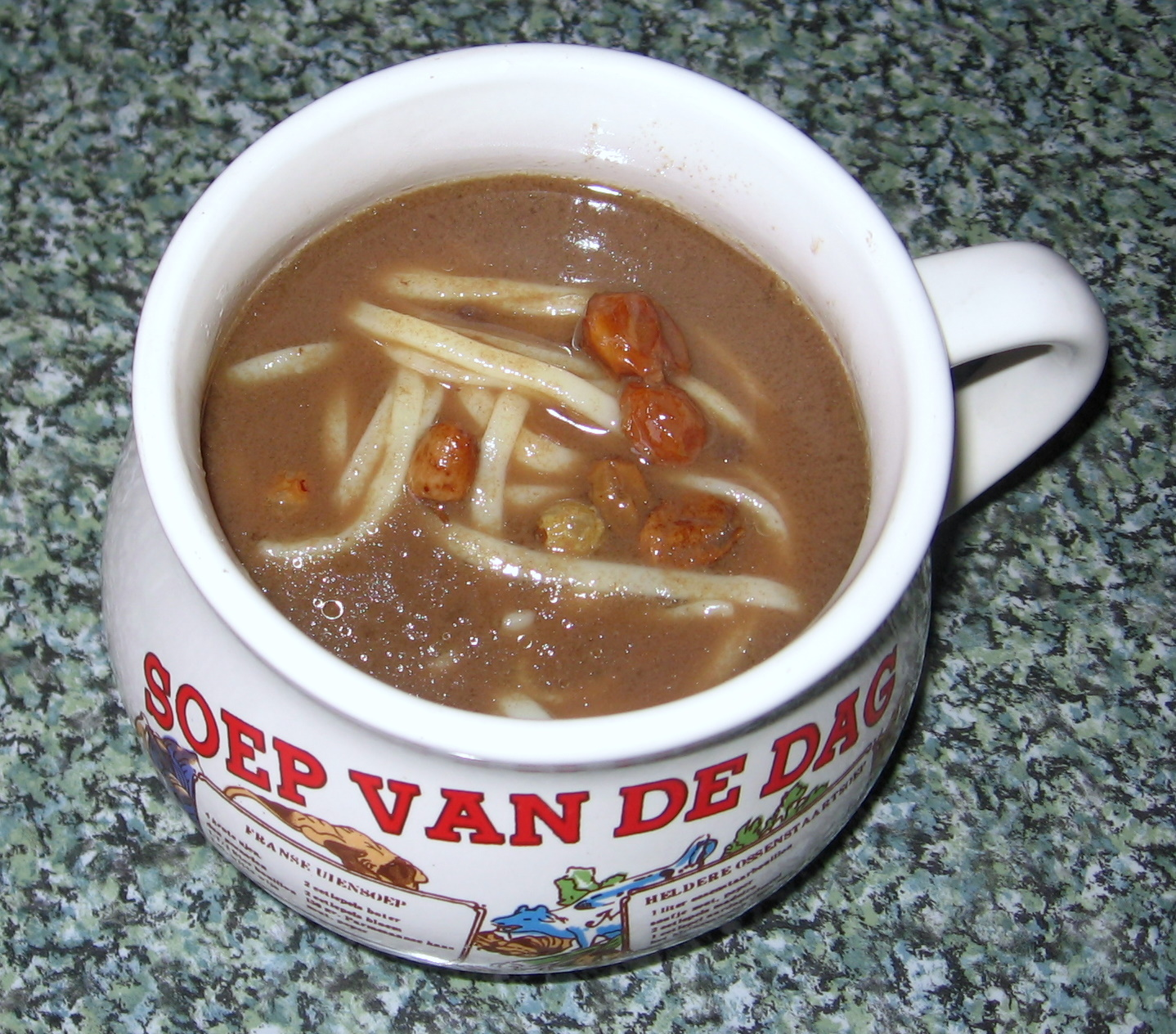
Czernina, a blood soup from Poland, served in a Dutch 'Soup of the Day' cup

Blood soups and stews, which use blood as part of the broth, include czernina, dinuguan, haejangguk, mykyrokka, pig's organ soup, tiết canh and svartsoppa.

Blood is also used as a thickener in sauces, such as coq au vin or pressed duck, and puddings, such as tiết canh. It can provide flavor or color for meat, as in cabidela.

=== Solidified ===
Blood can also be used as a solid ingredient, either by allowing it to congeal before use, or by cooking it to accelerate the process. Blood curd is a dish typically found in Asia that consists of cooled and hardened animal blood.

In China, "blood tofu" (Chinese: 血豆腐; pinyin: xiě dòufǔ) is most often made with pig's or duck's blood, although chicken's or cow's blood may also be used. The blood is allowed to congeal and simply cut into rectangular pieces and cooked. This dish is also known in Java as saren, made with chicken's or pig's blood. Blood tofu is found in curry mee as well as the Sichuan dish, mao xue wang (毛血旺). Chinese people use pig blood, tofu, and vegetables to make a healthy soup. This soup has a reputation as a healthy and tasty meal in China.

In Hungary, when a pig is slaughtered in the morning, the blood is fried with onions and served for breakfast. Hagymásvér, as it is called, is made from pig's blood and onions, often flavoured with paprika and marjoram.

Chicken blood has been used alongside organ meats to combat the anemia crisis in Peru.

In the Philippines, the street food made from grilled chicken blood is called "betamax", owing to its boxy shape, which resembles Betamax tapes. It is typically sold alongside grilled pork and chicken isaw (intestines) and other types of Filipino barbecue.

In Korea, blood curd is typically made of cattle blood and is often used as an ingredient for different kinds of soups and stews, such as hangover soup.

In Tibet, congealed yak's blood is a traditional food.

In Vietnamese cuisine, pig blood curd is used in soup based noodle dishes such as Bún bò Huế or Bánh canh, bún riêu, tiết canh and cháo lòng.

=== Raw ===
In some cases, blood is used as an ingredient without any additional preparation. Raw blood is not commonly consumed by itself, but may be used as an addition to drinks or other dishes. One example is the drinking of seal blood which is traditionally believed by the Inuit to bring health benefits.

=== Nutrition bars ===
Russia and ex-USSR countries produce sweet nutrition bars containing cattle blood, known under the generic name Hematogen; originally created for treating anemia, they are also used like regular sweets nowadays.

== Religious consumption of blood ==
The Catholic Church, as well as the Eastern Orthodox, Lutheran, Oriental Orthodox, and some Anglican churches, believe that in the sacrament of the Eucharist, the participants consume the real blood and body of Jesus Christ. The post-communion prayer of the 1662 Anglican Book of Common Prayer describes the meal as "spiritual food". Many other Christian denominations symbolically consume the Eucharist.

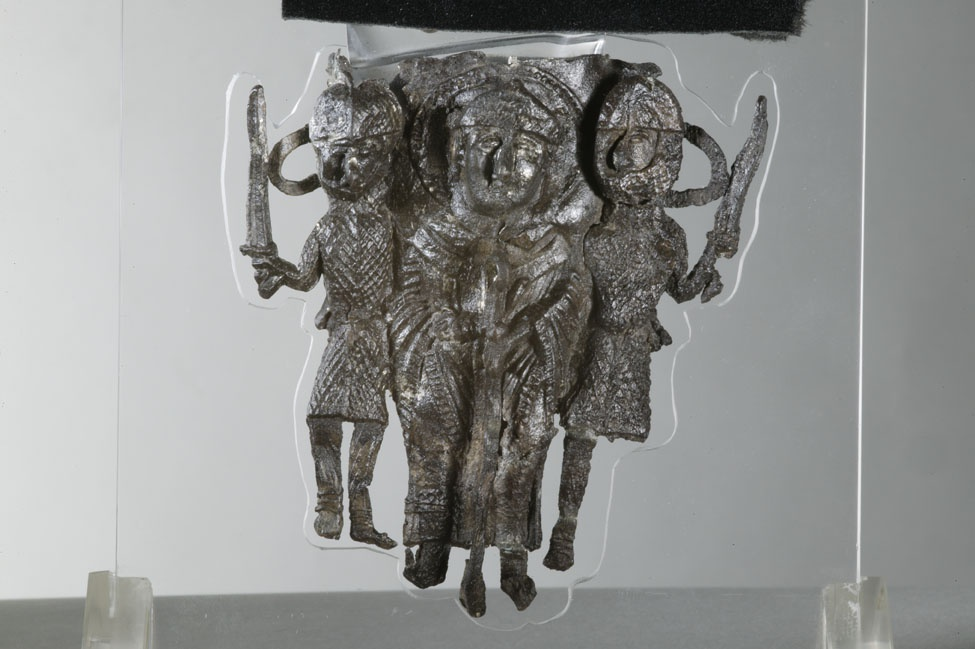
Remains of a metal ampulla depicting Becket's martyrdom. A pilgrim would have acquired it with miraculous "water of Saint Thomas".

The cult of saint Thomas Becket in England included the drinking of "water of Saint Thomas", a mix of water and the remains of the martyr's blood miraculously multiplied. The procedure was frowned upon by the more orthodox due to the similarities with the Eucharist.

== Cultural and religious considerations ==
Some cultures consider blood to be a taboo form of food. The taboos may be rooted in the fact that consuming greater quantities of blood may cause iron overload in some genetically predisposed individuals.

In Abrahamic religions, Judaism and Islam forbid the consumption of blood. In Judaism, the following passages from the Torah are relevant:

- Leviticus 7:26 "You may not partake of any blood from a fowl or an animal in all your dwellings."
- Deuteronomy 12:16 "However, you must not consume the blood; you must spill it on the ground like water."
- Deuteronomy 12:23–24 "However, be resolute not to consume the blood, for blood is the animal's life-force. You must not consume it; you must spill it onto the ground like water."

Blood and its by-products are forbidden in Islam, in the Qurʼan, surah 5, al-Ma'idah, verse 3. In the Christian New Testament, blood was forbidden by the Apostolic Decree due to banning sacrifice of animals before idols (Acts 15:19–21), and is still forbidden among Eastern Orthodox Churches.

The Catholic Church determined in the Council of Florence in 1438 that

the prohibition of the apostles "from things sacrificed to idols, and from blood and from things strangled" [Acts 15:29] befitted that time in which one Church arose from the Jews and the Gentiles, who before lived according to different ceremonies and customs, so that even the Gentiles observed some things in common with the Jews, and occasion was furnished for coming together into one worship of God and one faith, and ground for dissension was removed; since to the Jews, by reason of an ancient custom, blood and things strangled seemed abominable, and they could think that the Gentiles would return to idolatry because of the eating of things sacrificed. But when the Christian religion is so propagated that no carnal Jew appears in it, but all passing over to the Church, join in the same rites and ceremonies of the Gospel, believing "all things clean to the clean" [Titus 1:15], with the ending of the cause for this apostolic prohibition, the effect also ended. Thus it declares that the nature of no food, which society admits, is to be condemned, and no distinction is to be made by anyone at all, whether man or woman, between animals, and by whatever kind of death they meet their end; although for the health of body, for the exercise of virtue, for regular and ecclesiastical discipline many things not denied should be given up, since, according to the Apostle, "all things are lawful, but [not all things are] expedient" [1 Corinthians 6:12; 10:22].

== Dishes ==
=== Africa ===
Among the Maasai people, drinking blood from cattle is a part of the traditional diet, especially after special occasions involving a loss of blood such as ritual bloodletting or giving birth.

Cow blood is also consumed by the Bahima people.

The Herero people consumed cow blood with sour milk.

=== Americas ===
As in Europe, several varieties of blood sausage are also popular in Mexico (moronga), Quebec (boudin), Newfoundland and Labrador and the southwest United States, Chile (prietas, ñache), Brazil (chouriço), Argentina, Uruguay, Cuba, and Puerto Rico (morcilla).

==== Brazil ====
In Brazil, the traditional Portuguese dish known as cabidela (see above) is also eaten, as well a stew made of pork blood and offal called sarapatel.

==== Colombia ====
In the western region of Santander Colombia, a dish called pepitoria is made from rice cooked in goat blood.

==== Mexico ====
Mexicans from certain regions eat goat's stomach stuffed with pork blood and vegetables as a delicacy.

==== Peru ====
In Peru, clotted chicken blood is fried with chili peppers and Welsh onion. This dish is called sangrecita.

==== Ecuador ====
Yaguarlocro is a potato soup made with sprinklings of goat's blood.

=== Asia ===
==== China ====
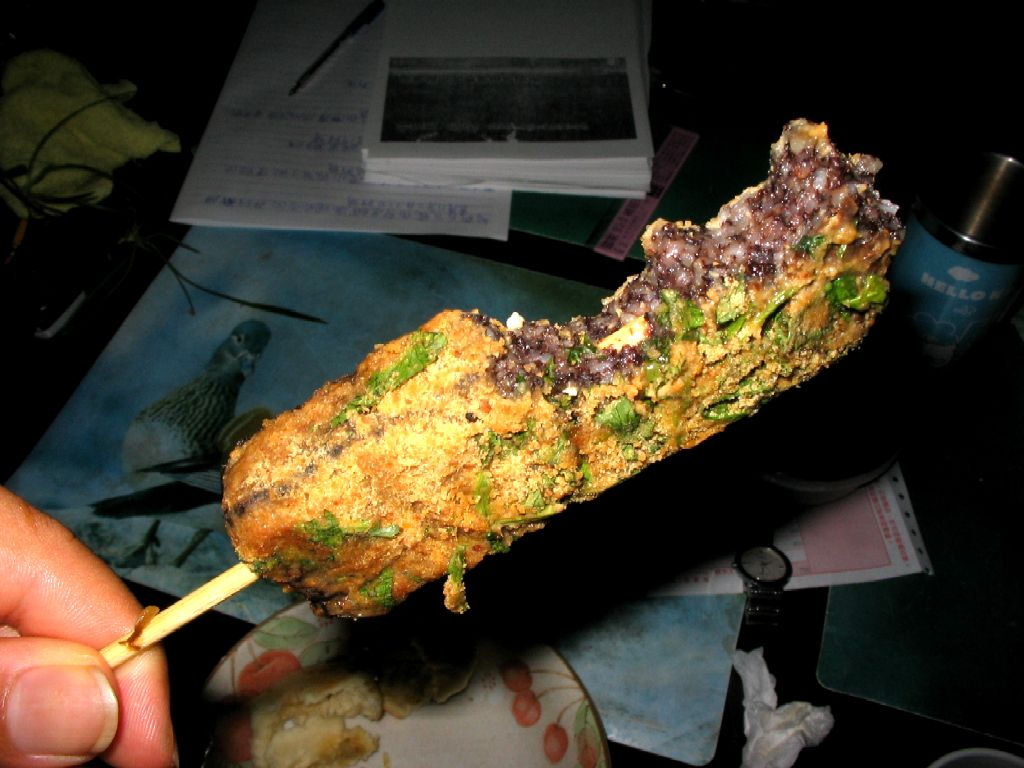
Deep fried blood pudding (豬血糕) on a stick

In China and some regions of Southeast Asia, coagulated chicken, duck, goose or pig blood, known in Chinese as "blood tofu" (Chinese: 血豆腐; pinyin: xiě/xuè dòu fǔ) is used in soups. In Taiwan, pig's blood cake (simplified Chinese: 猪血糕; traditional Chinese: 豬血糕; pinyin: zhū xiě/xuè gāo) is made of pork blood and sticky rice. It is fried or steamed as a snack or cooked in a hot pot.

==== India ====
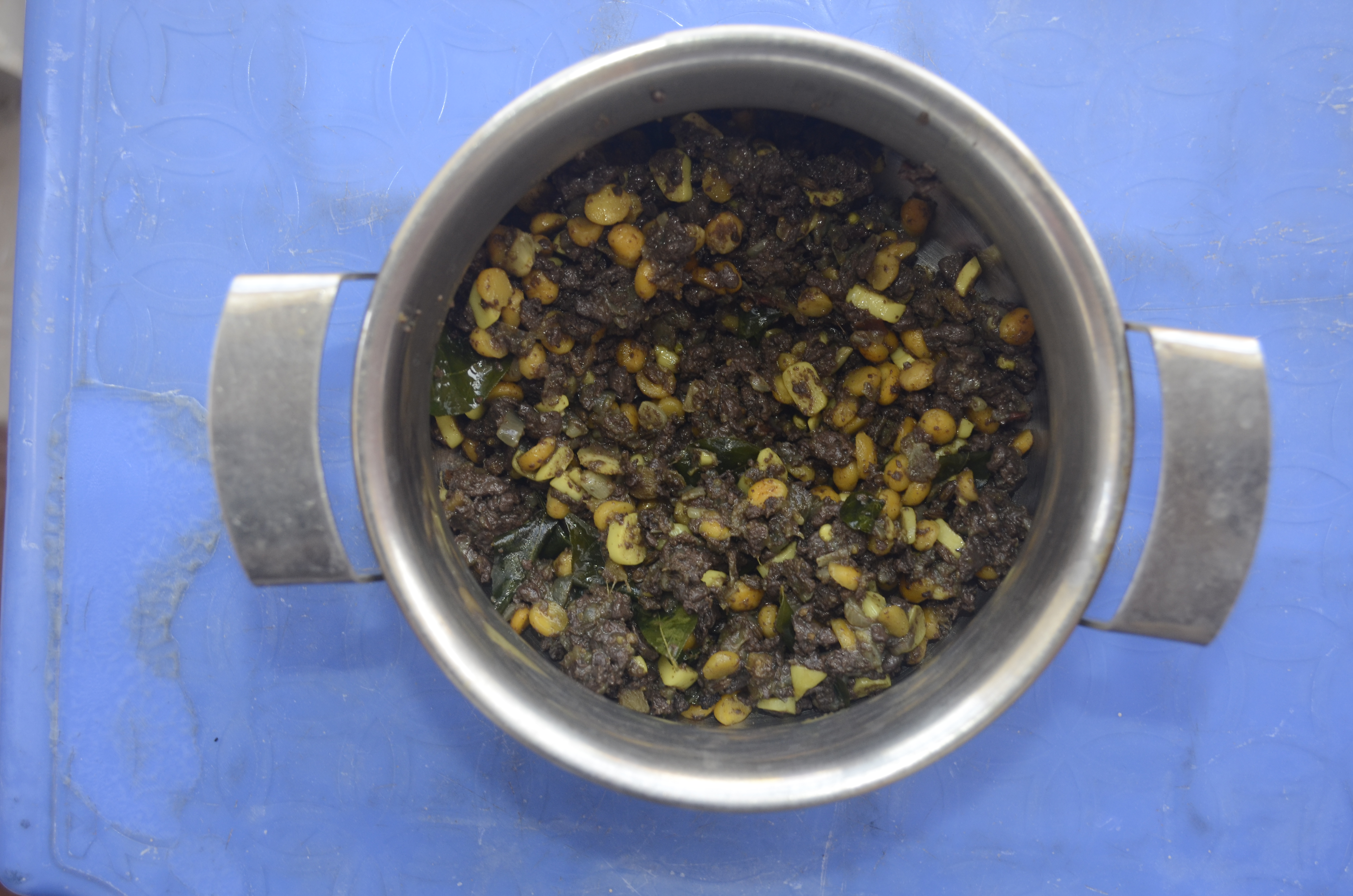
Goat blood-based dish in Tamil Nadu, India

In the South Indian state of Tamil Nadu, stir-fried lamb blood is a common dish for breakfast and lunch. When prepared alone it is called இரத்த பொரியல் (irattha poriyal). More commonly it is stir-fried with lamb stomach and intestines with spices like ginger, garlic, cloves, cinnamon, red chili powder, green chilies, coriander powder, cumin, shallots and grated coconut. This dish is very common in the Kongu Nadu region as a Breakfast delicacy and Madurai region of Tamil Nadu.

In the coastal Konkan region of India, Sorpotel, a dish of Portuguese origin is commonly cooked that includes parboiled meat and offal which is cooked in a spicy and vinegary sauce. Some people also use the animals' blood for boiling the curry. Sorpotel is primarily made by Catholics of Goa, Mangalore and Bombay East Indians of Mumbai. In Kumaon, a spicy dish called Luvash is made by pan frying lamb blood with pahadi ghee.

==== Indonesia ====
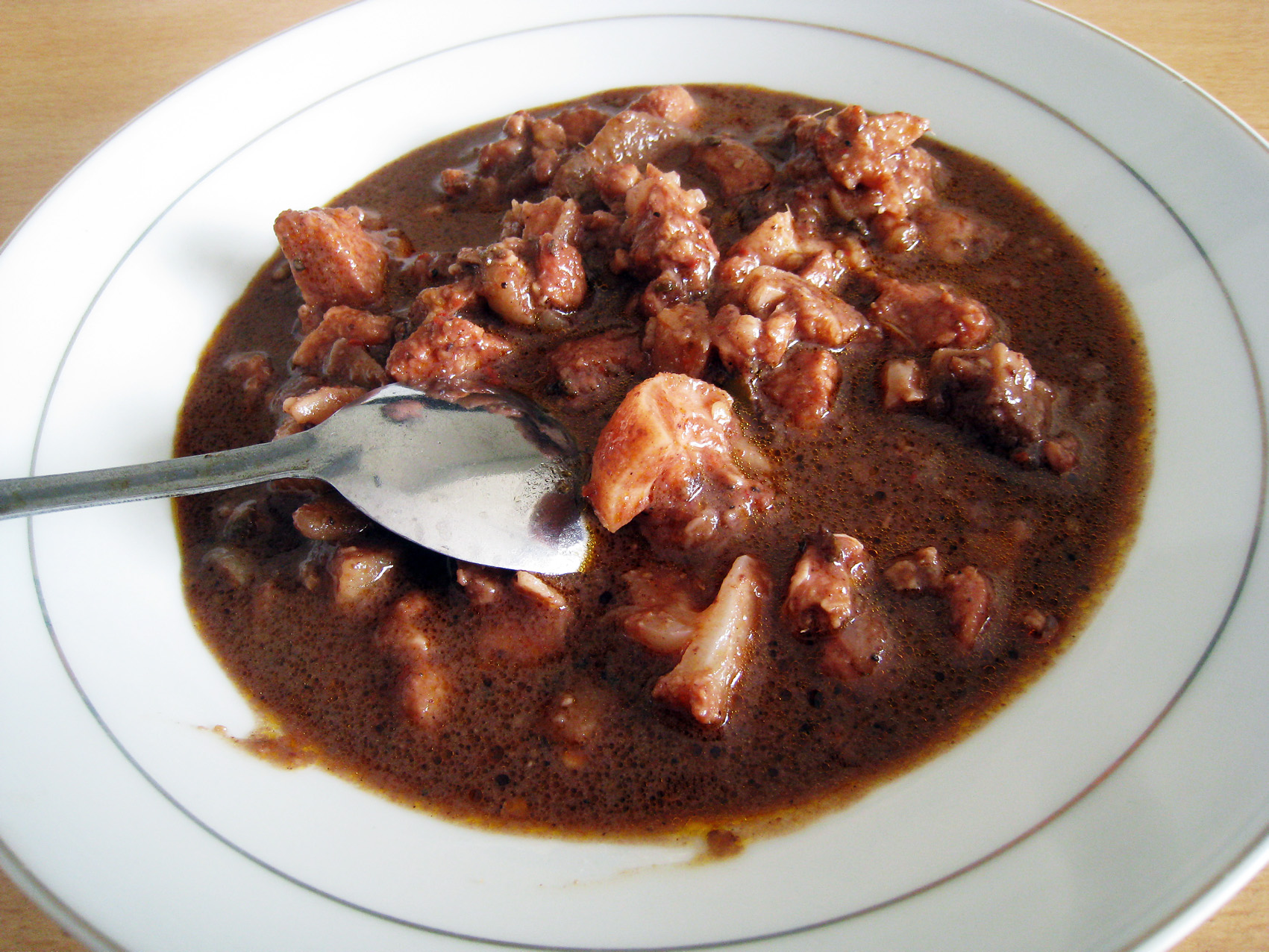
Saksang, pieces of pork meat stewed in its blood and spices

In Indonesia, especially the Batak tribe in North Sumatra, pig's blood is used as an ingredient and sauce mixed with andaliman (Zanthoxylum acantophodium) for a cuisine named Sangsang (read saksang). In Balinese cuisine, pork blood is sometimes added into lawar dish, a mixture of vegetables, coconut and minced meat mixed with rich herbs and spices to create lawar merah (red lawar).

In Joshua Oppenheimer's film The Look of Silence, several of the anti-Communist militias active in the Indonesian mass killings of 1965–66 claim that drinking blood from their victims is what prevented them going mad.

==== Korea ====
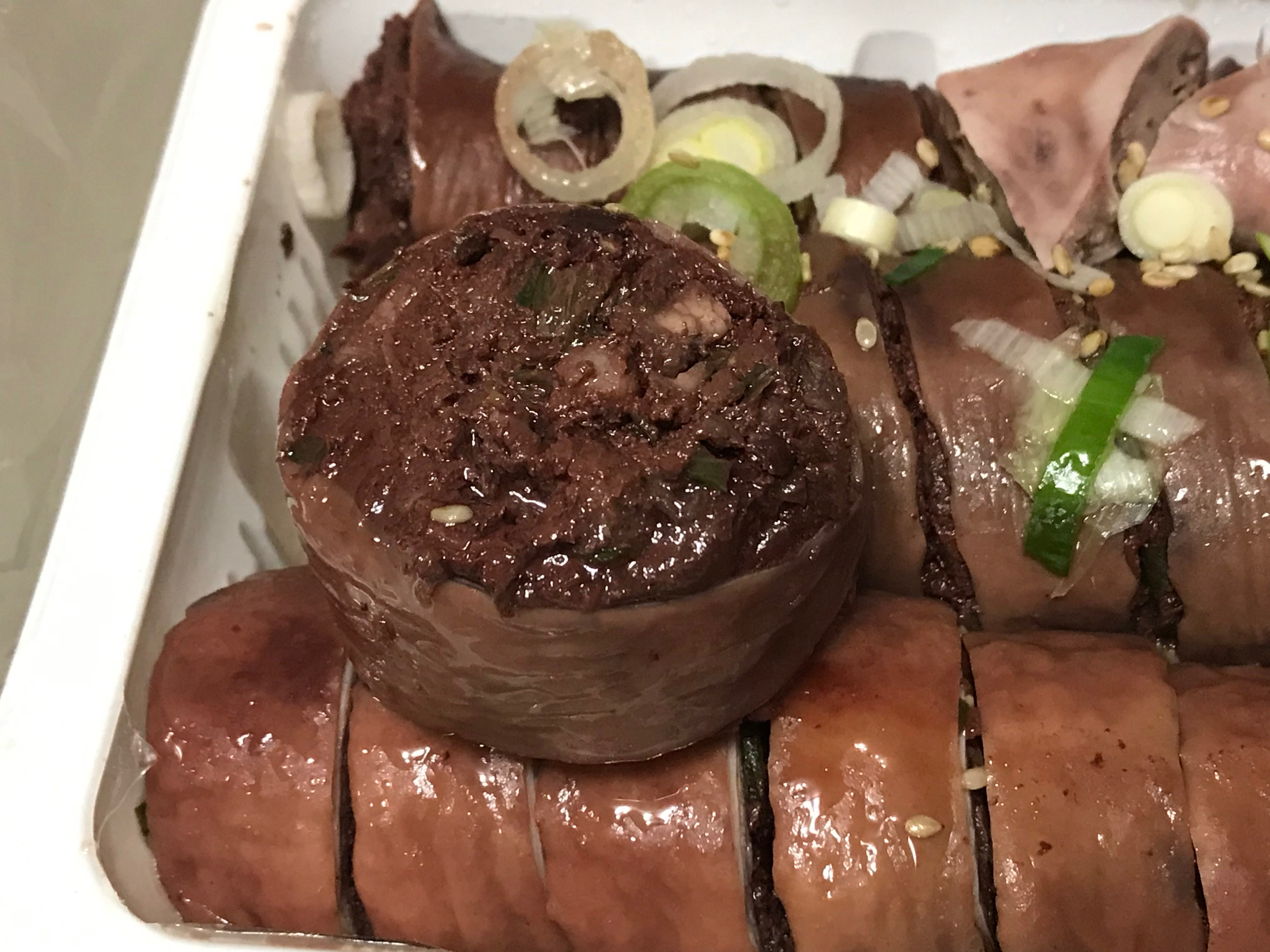
Sundae, Korean blood sausage

In Korea, blood as food is known as seonji (선지 [sʌn.dʑi]; derived from the Manchu word senggi (ᠰᡝᠩᡤᡳ) meaning "blood"). Coagulated cattle seonji and dried radish greens are added to the beef legbone broth in order to make seonji-guk (blood curd soup). Sundae, a blood sausage made generally by boiling or steaming cow or pig's intestines that are stuffed with various ingredients, such as pig's blood, cellophane noodles, kimchi, scallions, etc.

==== Nepal ====
In northern region of Nepal, Gyuma a blood sausage is a popular dish commonly eaten by locals. It is made of yak's blood and meat. The fillings also include buck wheat flour and other spices. The sausage is also used in lentils or prepared in stir fry dishes.

People of Newar community also consume popular dish called "cho hee," which means blood that is prepared by steaming the blood with some local spices. It is consumed by most of the locals in Patan, Kathmandu, Bhaktapur area of Nepal.

==== Philippines ====
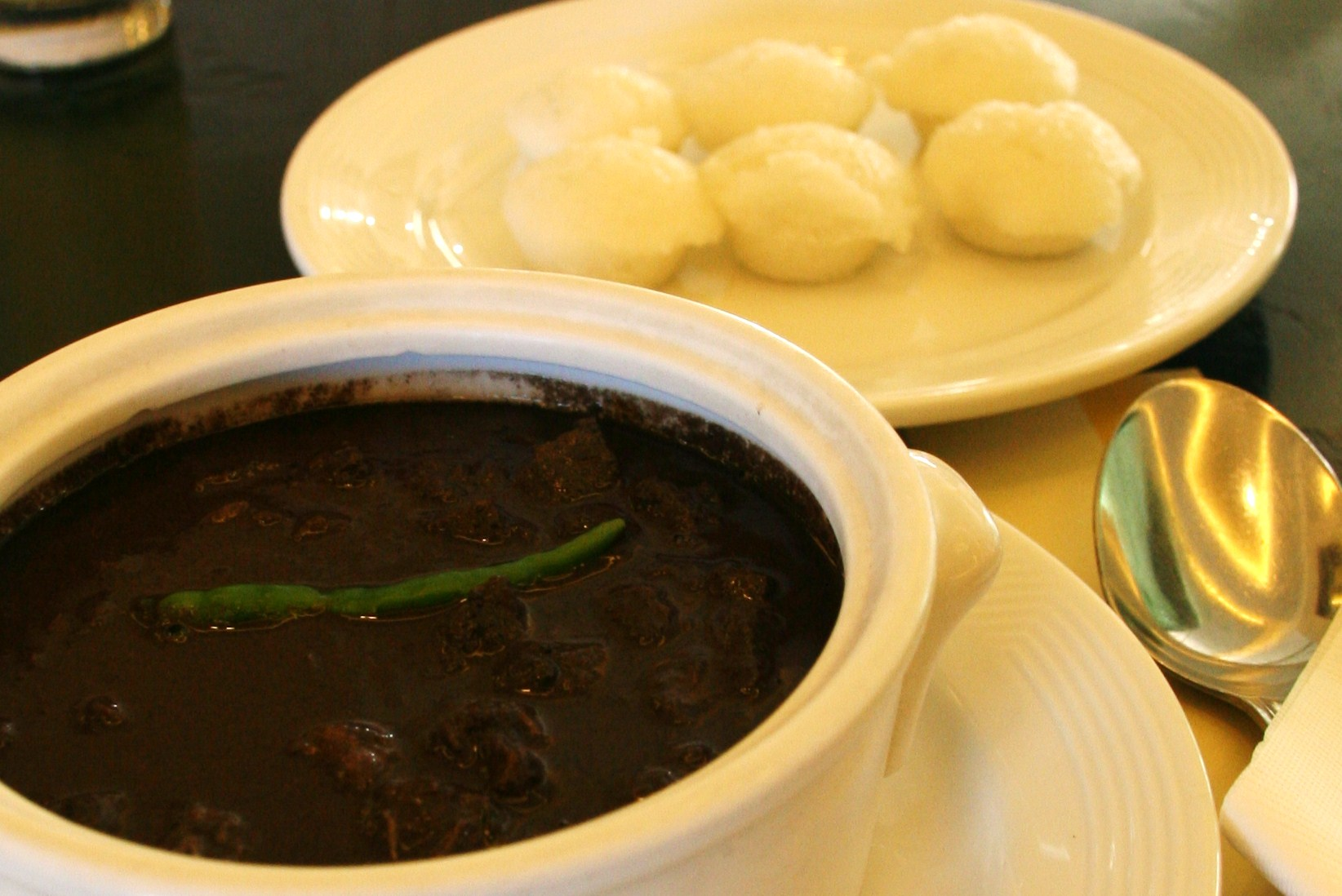
Filipino dinuguan, a pork blood stew traditionally served with steamed rice cakes (puto)

In the Philippines, a popular dish called dinuguan is made from pig's blood and offal seasoned with chili and is traditionally eaten with white rice or steamed rice cakes (puto). Numerous variants exist throughout the islands. Dinuguan can also be served without using any offal, using only choice cuts of pork. In Batangas, this version is known as sinungaok. It can also be made from beef and chicken meat, the latter being known as dinuguang manok ('chicken dinuguan'). The Northern Luzon versions of the dish namely the Ilocano dinardaraan and the Ibanag zinagan are often drier with toppings of deep-fried pork intestine cracklings. These versions are sometimes known as "crispy dinuguan" elsewhere. The Itawis of Cagayan also have a pork-based version that has larger meat chunks and more fat, which they call twik.

Aside from dinuguan, a native blood sausage known as pinuneg also exists among the Kankanaey people of the highlands of Luzon. Cubes of pork blood grilled on skewers is also a common street food throughout the Philippines. These are known colloquially as "betamax" (after its resemblance to Betamax tapes).

The Ilocano crispy pork dish bagnet may also sometimes be dipped in raw pig's blood. Though this is rare. In Western Visayas, the meat-and-liver stew bas-uy can also be enriched with blood.

==== Thailand and Laos ====
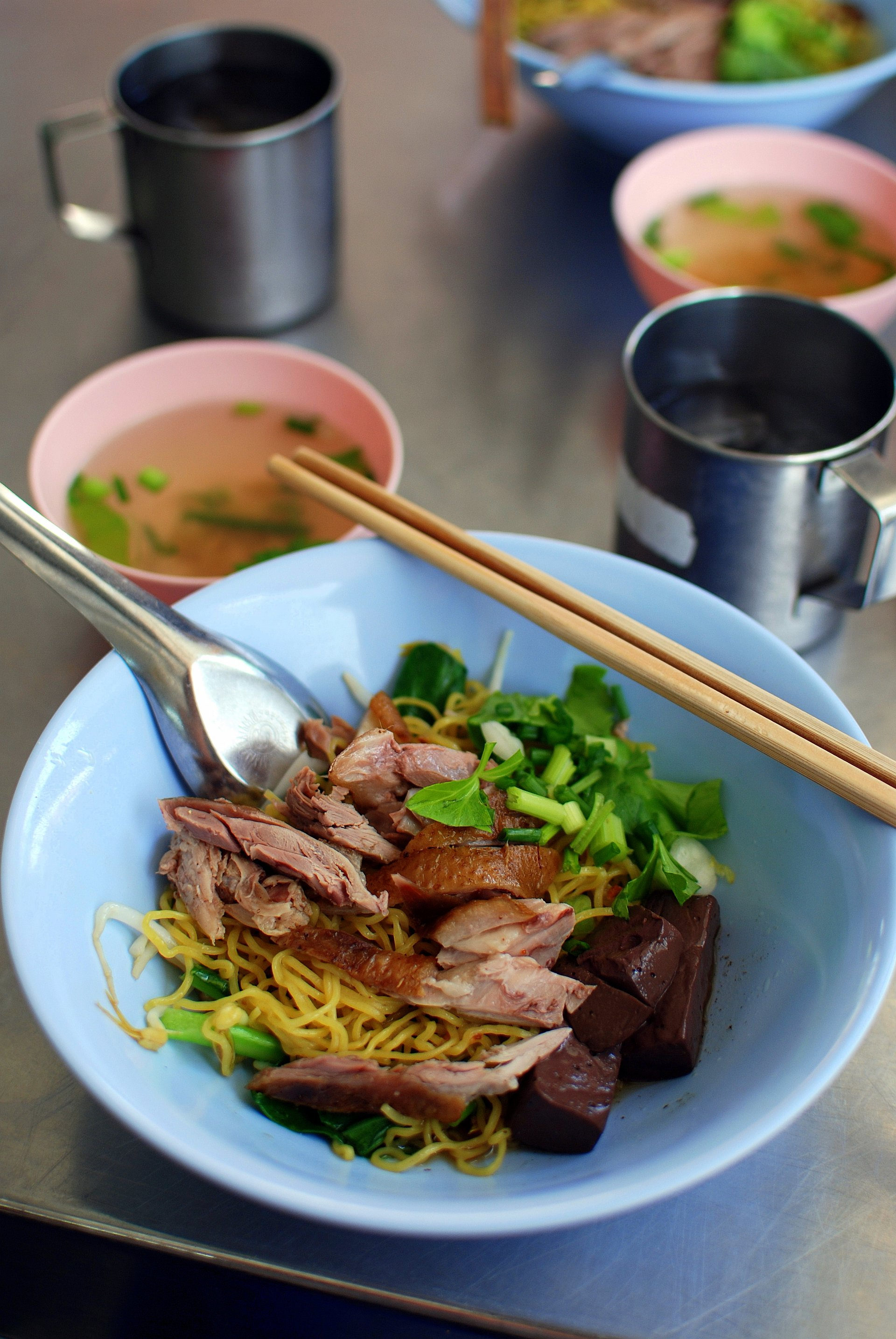
Bami haeng ped in Chiang Mai, Thailand: wheat noodles with duck and pieces of curdled blood

Coagulated chicken, duck, goose or pig blood is used in soups, such as the classic Thai dish Tom Lued Moo (pork blood soup). Thailand also has a dish known as Nam Tok, which is a spicy soup stock enriched with raw cow or pig's blood. It is often used to enrich regular noodle dishes, as well as in Khao soi.

In Laos and Northeast Thailand), a raw version of laap, a meat salad, is made with minced raw meat, seasoned in spices, and covered with blood. The spicy noodle soup Nam ngiao and certain variants of Khao soi of the cuisine of Shan State and Northern Thailand contain diced curdled blood.

==== Vietnam ====
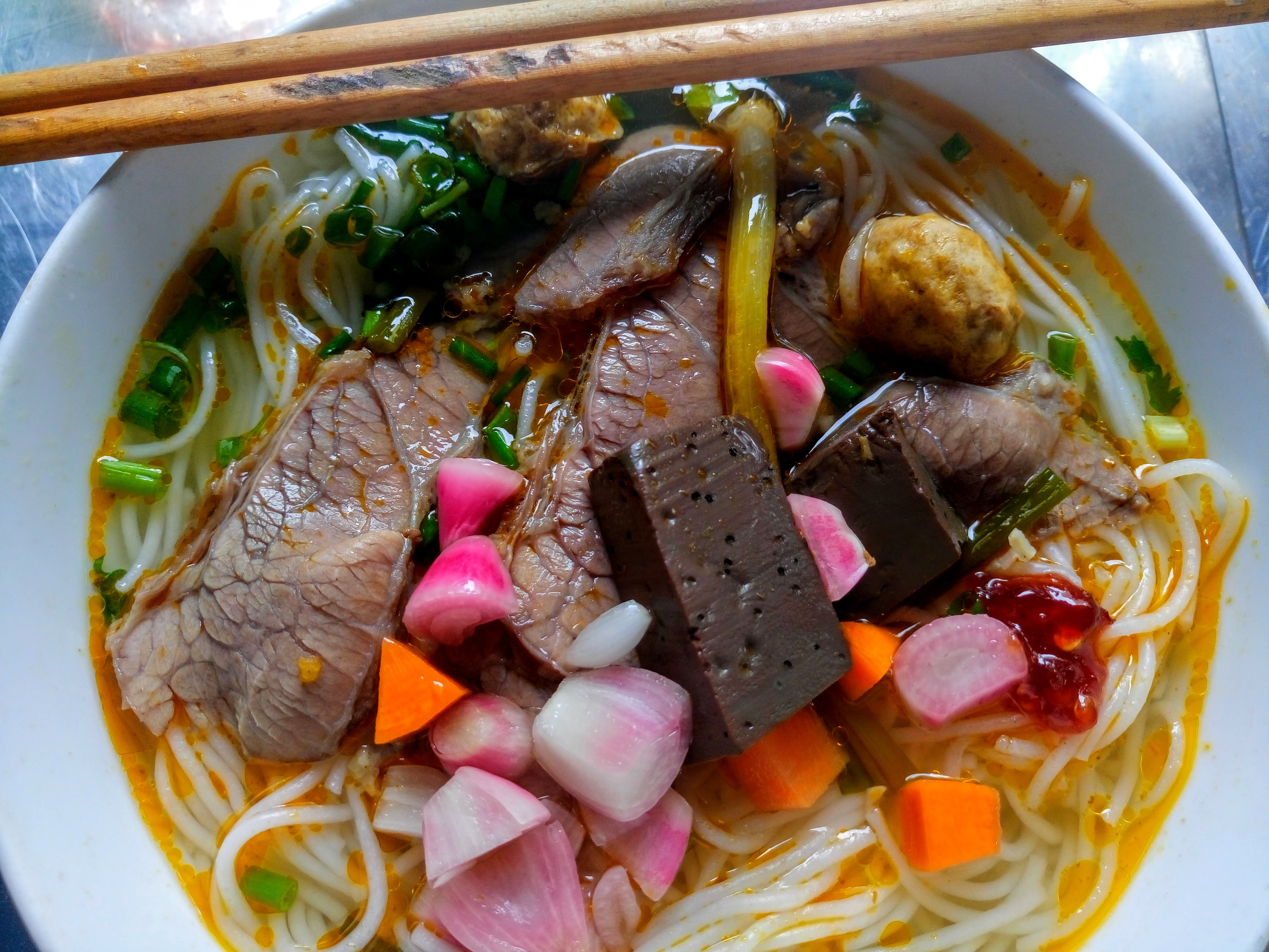
Congealed pork blood in Bún bò Huế

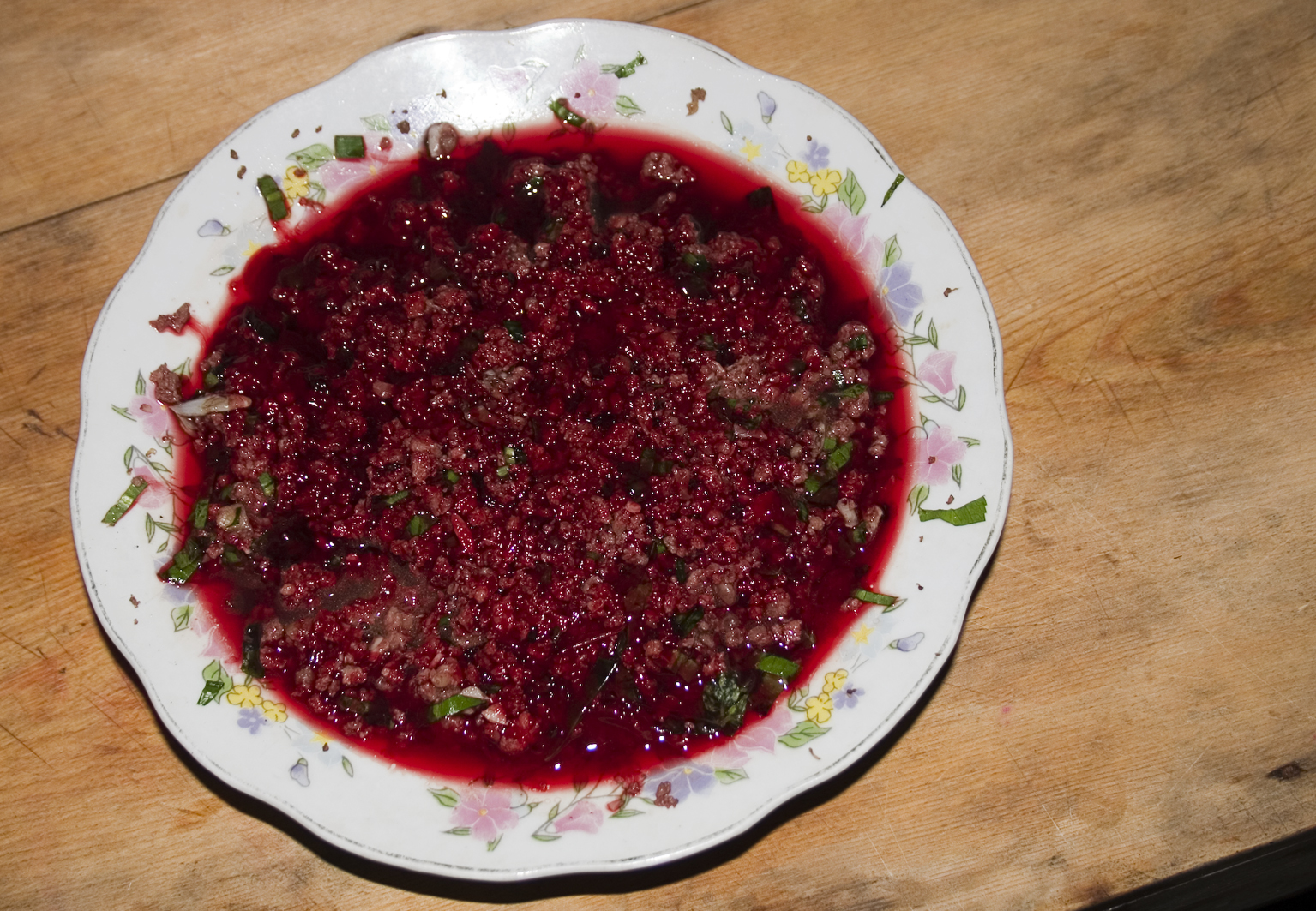
A bowl of Tiết canh

In Vietnam, congealed pork blood is used in Bún bò Huế (a spicy noodle soup), as well as congee (a type of rice porridge). It is simply solidified, then put into the broth to absorb the flavor. Blood is also consumed raw in Vietnam although it is not so popular nowadays due to health concern and a better understanding of how raw blood may contain parasites and other organisms that are harmful to humans.

This type of raw blood dish is called "tiết canh", literally translated as "blood soup". As its name suggests, the soup is prepared with raw and uncooked animal blood. Firstly, blood is collected when the animal is slaughtered, then it is mixed with a little bit of fish sauce or salt water to prevent it from congealing (this step varies a lot from person to person and from region to region), this is to have time to prepare the other part of the dish, usually a mixture of the slaughtered animal's heart, liver, stomach, some time, its kidney, being diced and cooked.

Then, the cooked mixture is divided into serving portions. The blood is now mixed with regular drinking water (there is specific ratio between the blood and the water), then it will be poured onto the cooked mixture. After 10–15 minutes, the blood will start to congeal and the final product will have a consistency similar to jelly. Various herbs, roasted and smashed peanut are topped on the congealed blood to enhance its flavor.

This dish is usually made with pig's blood and duck's blood but it can also be made from any type of animal's blood.

In China and Vietnam certain types of snake blood are considered to be an aphrodisiac, and are drunk with rice wine.

=== Europe ===
==== Czech Republic ====
In the Czech Republic, pig's blood from traditional pig slaughter is used to make blood soup prdelačka and blood sausages jelito.

==== Finland ====
In Finland, pig's blood is used, with milk, flour and molasses, to make blood pancakes (veriohukainen), usually served with lingonberry jam. Different types of sausages are also common, including mustamakkara and ryynimakkara. Verileipä is a type of bread made with blood. Veripalttu is another dish available in some parts of the country.

==== France ====
In France, there is "sanquette", a solidified/curd blood in a pan, and "boudin noir", a sort of sausage.

==== Germany ====
In Northern Germany pig's blood used to be traditionally mixed with vinegar, scraps, spices and sugar to make schwarzsauer. It is eaten warm or preserved in jars. Changes in taste and lifestyle have made this an uncommon dish.

==== Greece ====
In ancient Lakedaimon, the Greek city-state of Sparta, the black broth was common: a soup with pork meat and blood.

==== Hungary ====
In Hungary, hagymás vér (pan-fried pig's/mangalica's blood with onions) often served with hot peppers and véres hurka (a kind of blood sausage made with pig's blood, bacon, pork, rice, onion, salt and various herbs and spices) are common winter foods. The dark mahagony colored Véres pite (bloody pie) is also made. Pig slaughter is considered a cultural event, when the villagers feast together. Here, all parts of the pig are used, from its blood and cloven hoof (out of which they make körömpörkölt) to its head. In fact, the pig's heart and lungs are also often consumed.

In the old days, they also used to make a soup/sauce called Black soup (fekete leves) out of it, similar to svartsoppa. Currently, the word black soup (in Hungary) is used to describe an unpleasant obligation, an impending sudden negative event. Legend has it that the Turks invited a Hungarian nobleman to dinner. The soldiers were ordered to attack him when "The black soup is still left" was said, hence the phrase.

==== Italy ====
In Italy, the sanguinaccio dolce is a pudding made with pig blood, chocolate, sugar, pine nuts, raisins and milk.

Biroldo is a blood sausage traditionally made with parts of pigs offal like heart, lungs and tongues.

==== Netherlands ====
Balkenbrij is a Dutch food made by combining pig's blood with a variety of ingredients, principally flour or oatmeal, and pig organs, such as intestines. Black pudding, in Dutch "bloedworst," is also consumed. In the Limburg province bloedworst, in Limburgish "poetes" or "trip," is consumed with apples baked in a thick syrup called stroop.

==== Poland ====
Czernina (black soup) is a Polish soup made of duck blood and clear poultry broth, sometimes known as "duck soup". Hen, rabbit or pig blood can also be used.

Kaszanka is the Polish incarnation of blood sausage. It's made of pig's blood and buckwheat or barley kasza.

==== Portugal ====
In Portugal, the northern region known as Minho has a traditional blood soup named papas de sarrabulho. "Papas" translates as "mash" and "sarrabulho" is a popular expression for coagulated blood, so the literal translation would be "mashed blood". The soup is made with pig's blood, chicken meat, pork, ham, salami, lemon and bread, and is typically sprinkled with cumin, which provides the dish with its distinctive odor. It is usually served in the winter because it is a rather heavy dish. The dish is seldom eaten in southern Portugal. Also very popular, is morcela sausage, a type of black pudding. Another traditional Portuguese dish known as cabidela is also made by cooking chicken or rabbit in its own blood, sometimes diluted with vinegar. The same cabidela dish is done with lamprey eel's blood and flesh along with rice, during the months of March and April following the migration of these fishes throughout Portugal's rivers.

There is also a candy called Papas de moado, which is prepared from pig's blood, flour, sugar, nuts and spices, mainly in the Mondego River region.

==== Romania ====
In Romania there is a traditional sausage prepared with blood named sângerete, literally meaning "a thing from hemoragy" (it came from sângera – "hemoragy" from sânge – "blood")), and it is prepared especially during the Ignat (the pig carving holiday).

==== Spain ====
In Spain, the morcilla sausage is a kind of black pudding mainly made with pig blood, with spices, fat, and sometimes vegetables. In Andalusia sangre encebollada and Valencian sang amb ceba are popular dishes made with chicken or pork solidified blood and onion. In Galician cuisine, filloas (a dish similar to crêpes) are sometimes made with pork blood.

==== Sweden ====
In Sweden, the blood soup svartsoppa, made with goose blood, is traditionally eaten on the eve of St. Martin, especially in the southern region of Skåne. Other popular dishes, with blood as one of the ingredients include blodpudding (blood pudding), blodplättar (blood pancakes), blodpalt (potato dumplings flavoured with reindeer or pig blood) and paltbröd (bread with blood in it, which is dried and boiled and eaten together with fried pork and bèchamel or onion sauce).

==== United Kingdom and Ireland ====
In Britain, Ireland, and some Commonwealth countries, "black pudding" or "blood pudding" is made from blood and some filler grains and spices, often oatmeal.

In Montgomeryshire, Wales, goose blood was used to make a pastry tart at Christmas time.

In Ireland, there is ample evidence of the persistence of the practice of bleeding live cattle until well into the 19th century. It was considered to be a preventative measure against cattle diseases, and the blood drawn, when mixed with butter, herbs, oats or meal, provided a nutritious emergency food.

== In Fiction ==
- Klingons drink Klingon bloodwine in Star Trek.

== See also ==
- Clinical vampirism – Obsession with drinking blood
