= Sangrecita =

Peruvian dish made of chicken blood

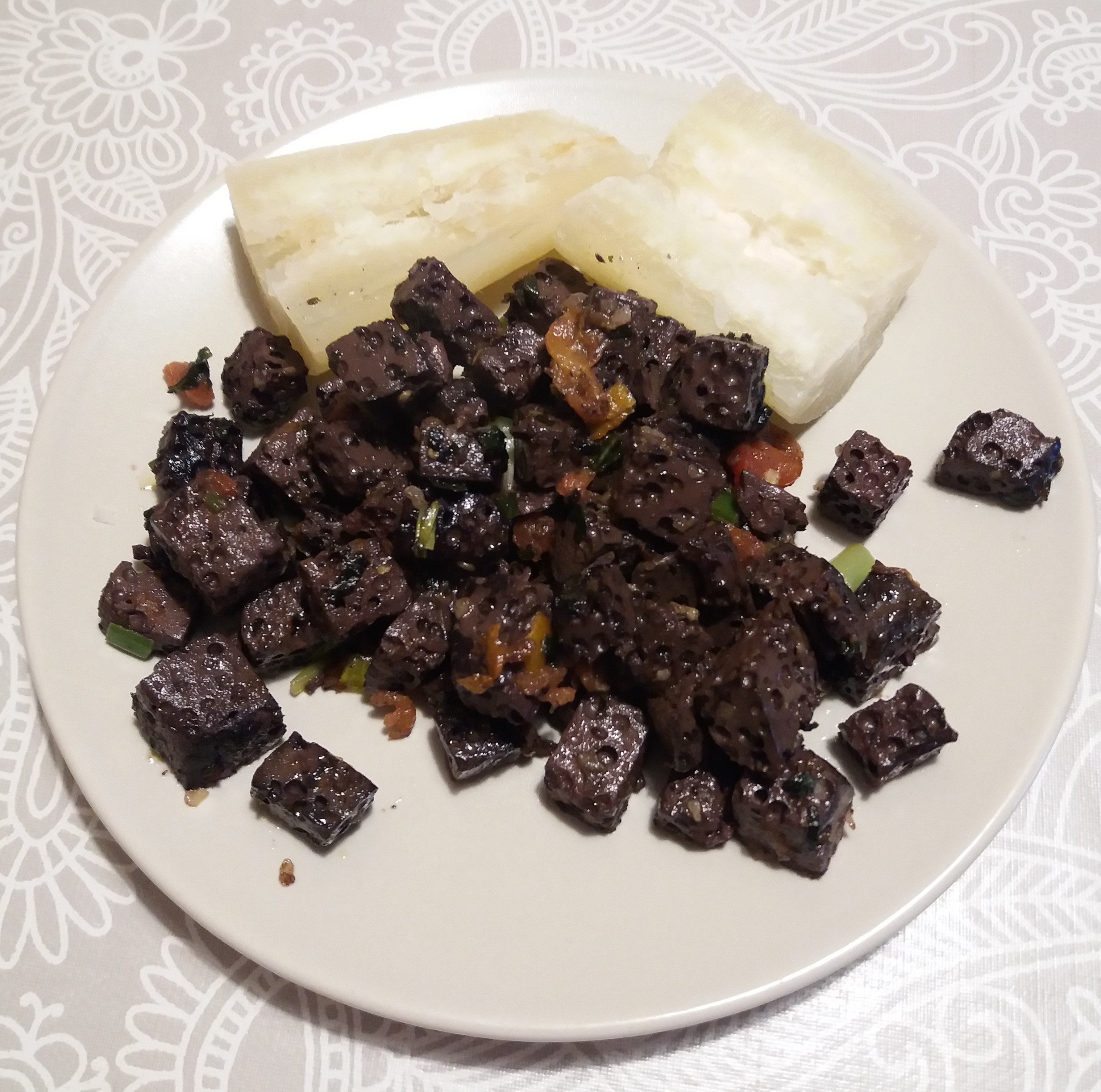
- Sangrecita with yuca
- Associated cuisine: Peruvian cuisine
- Main ingredients: Chicken blood

Sangrecita is a Peruvian cuisine dish of chicken blood. It is seasoned with garlic, onion, chili pepper, herbs and prepared with baked potatoes, fried sweet potatoes or cassava.

== Nutrition ==
Chicken blood contains high amounts of protein and iron, a nutrient important for the prevention of anaemia.

== See also ==
- Blood as food
