= Svartsoppa =

Traditional Swedish dish

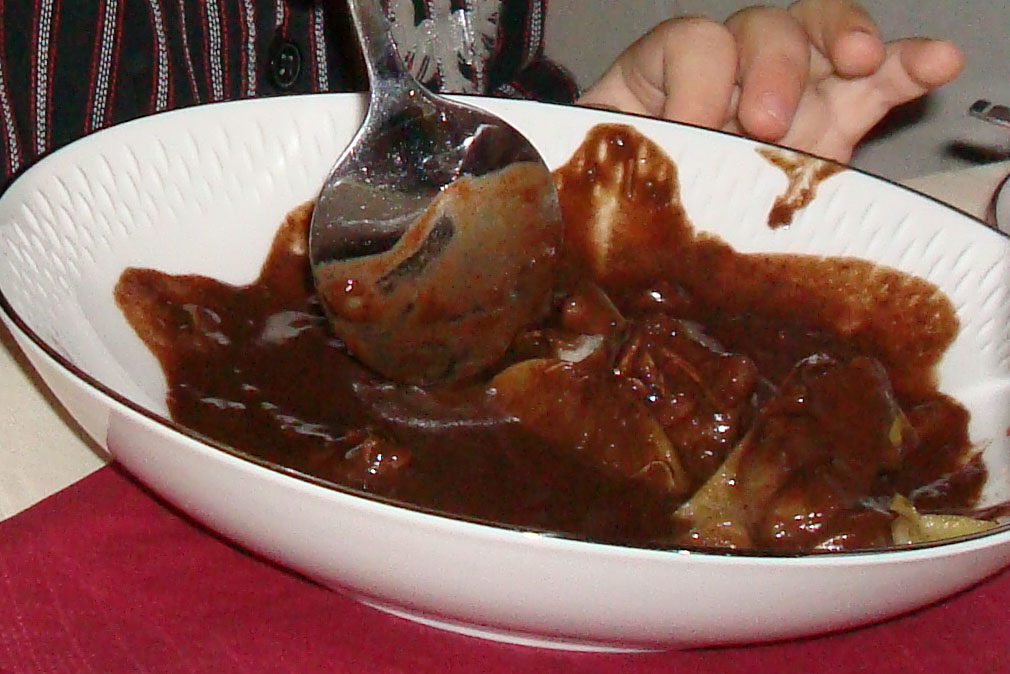
- Type: Soup
- Place of origin: Sweden
- Region or state: Scania
- Main ingredients: Blood (goose or pig)

Svartsoppa ("black soup") is a soup consumed traditionally and mostly in the province of Skåne in southern Sweden. The main ingredient is goose blood (or sometimes pig blood). It is often eaten before the goose dish at the Mårtens gås or Mårten gås dinner on the 10 November, the eve of Saint Martin (11 November), a surviving remnant of the Roman Catholic feast dedicated to Martin of Tours. Goose is traditionally eaten at this feast over large parts of Europe, with associations to the folklore surrounding Saint Martin.

Black soup has existed in some form almost everywhere in the world, limited only by religious beliefs. Today the dish has left most localities' cuisines.

== See also ==
- Black soup
- Blood as food
- Czernina
- List of soups
