= Ñachi =

Traditional Chilean blood dish

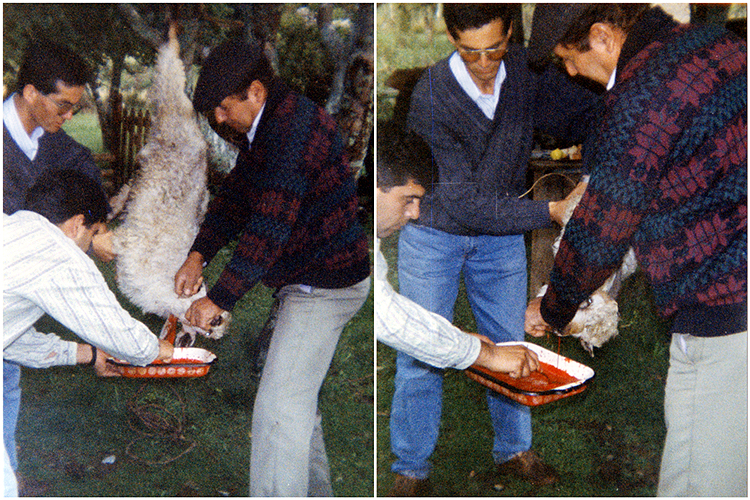
Extraction of lamb blood to be eaten as ñachi.

Ñachi or ñache is a food of Mapuche people from Chile, prepared with fresh animal blood and dressings.

Blood of lamb or pig is preferred. The blood is mixed with coriander, merken or chili, salt and lemon juice. As soon as the blood coagulates, it is cut into cubes and served with bread.
