= Tiết canh =

Raw blood pudding with cooked meat

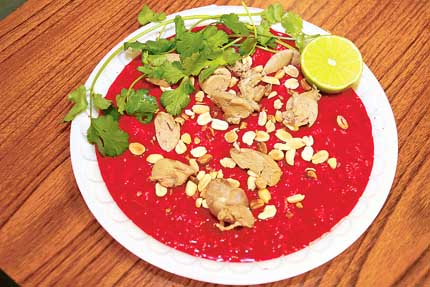
- Type: Pudding
- Place of origin: Northern Vietnam
- Region or state: Southeast Asia
- Main ingredients: Blood (swine or duck), fish sauce, meat, peanuts, herbs (Vietnamese coriander, mint)

Tiết canh is a Vietnamese dish of raw blood pudding served with cooked meat across Vietnam. Pork and duck are the most common animal used to create this raw blood pudding. The most popular is tiết canh vịt, made from freshly killed duck blood, pork and chicken.

Tiết canh can be made from duck, goat, pig, goose, chicken, calf, as well as from snake, crab, lobster, blood cockle, or vegetables.

Consumption of tiết canh is also associated with good fortune.

== Typical preparation ==
The freshly drawn blood is collected in a bowl, and prevented from premature coagulation (hãm huyết), by mixing it with some fish sauce of certain proportions, usually three to five soup spoons of fish sauce for one quart (approximately 1 liter) of blood. Finely chopped meat such as cooked duck innards (gizzards, for example) and duck meat are put in a shallow dish along with a sprinkling of crushed peanuts and chopped herbs such as Vietnamese coriander, mint, etc. The blood and fish sauce mixture is then diluted with some watery broth left from cooking the meat and/or gizzards to promote blood coagulation, then quickly poured into the prepared meat dish. The finished dish can be kept cool in the refrigerator, which allows the blood to maintain its coagulated state, when immediate consumption is not called for right away. If the dish is removed from the refrigerator and left to sit at room temperature for a while the blood will return to a liquid state.

== Health risk ==
Raw pig's blood often contains swine bacteria, and ingesting them may cause severe bacterial infections. For example, a Streptococcus bacterium infection may cause respiratory decline, blood contamination, and severe necrosis in arms and legs, and is potentially fatal. There are reports of human casualties after eating raw blood pudding.

== See also ==
- List of duck dishes
- Blood as food
