= Sanguinaccio dolce =

Italian dessert made from pig blood

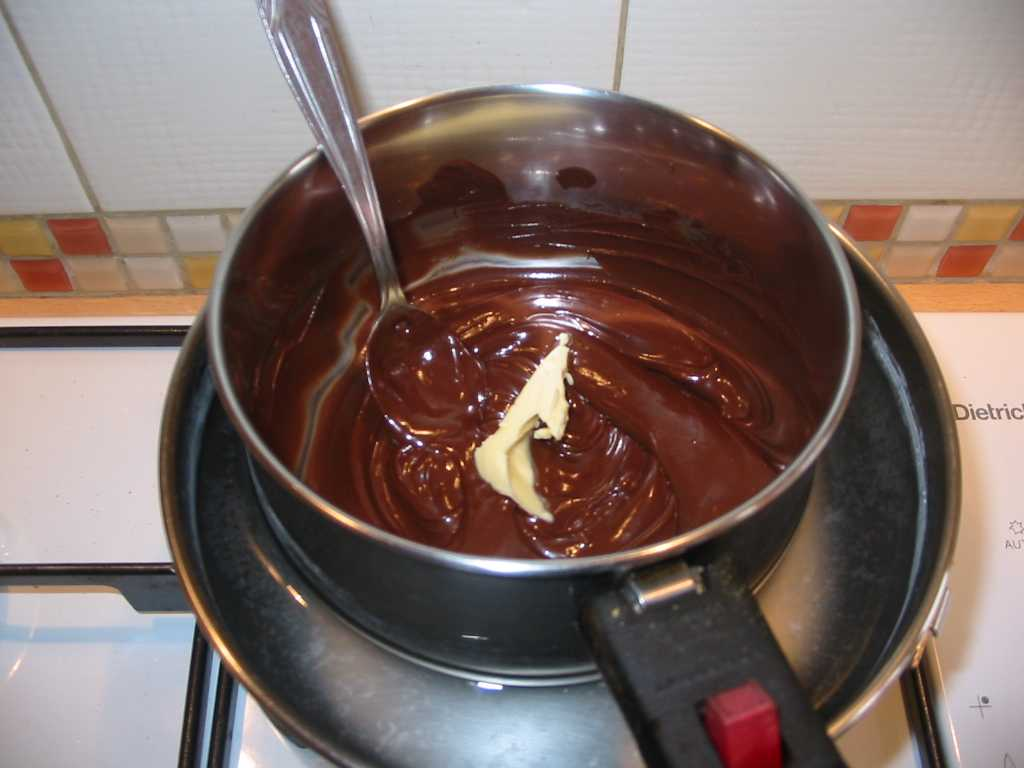
Preparation of sanguinaccio dolce

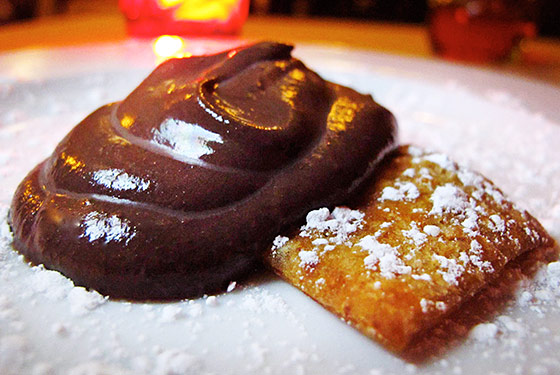
Sanguinaccio dolce

Sanguinaccio dolce ('sweet blood pudding' in English) is an Italian sweet cream based on bitter dark chocolate and pig blood, recognized as a prodotto agroalimentare tradizionale (PAT) in several Italian regions. There are local variations in the degree to which it is served warm and runny for dipping or allowed to set and formed into a pudding or cake. In Naples, it is traditionally prepared for Carnival. However, public sale of pig blood was banned for health reasons in 1992.

The dessert appears in the TV series Hannibal as a favourite of Hannibal Lecter.

== See also ==
- List of Italian desserts and pastries
- Pig blood curd
- Blood as food
