= Blodpalt =

Northern Finnish dumplings made with flour and blood

- Alternative names: veripalttu; asins pankūkas
- Type: Dumpling (Palt)
- Place of origin: Finland, Sweden, Latvia
- Main ingredients: Potatoes, flour, blood

Blodpalt (Swedish; Finnish: veripalttu; Latvian: asins pankūkas) is a type of palt, a dumpling made from barley or rye flour and (but not always) grated raw potatoes, with blood added.

Blodpalt is an old-fashioned dish still fairly common in northern Finland and parts of northern Sweden. The dish's history goes back to a time when the households carefully made use of all parts of the animals to get enough food. Adding blood made it a more nutritious meal that was often eaten during the dark and long winter.

In Lapland, blodpalt is usually made with reindeer blood, and rye or wheat flour, but no potatoes, and served either as dumplings in a soup, or with unsmoked bacon. In other parts of northern Sweden, blodpalt is made the same way as regular bacon-filled palt, but with blood added to the dough.

== See also ==
- Black pudding
- Blodplättar
