= Blodplättar =

Dish served in Finland, Estonia, Sweden and Norway

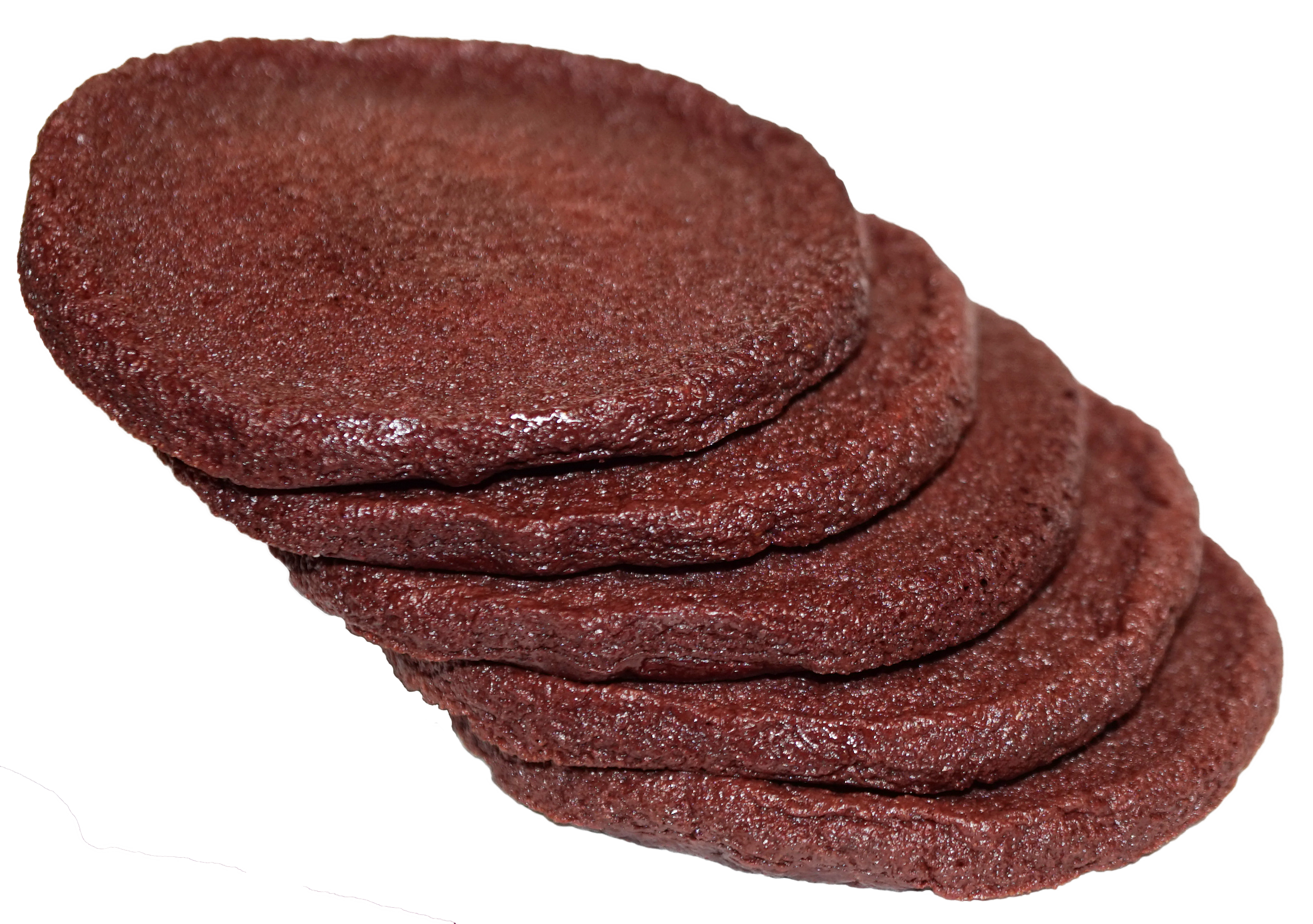
Finnish blood pancakes

Blodplättar (in Swedish; blodpannekaker in Norwegian, veriohukainen, verilätty or verilettu in Finnish), or blood pancakes in English are a dish served in Finland, Sweden and Norway made of whipped blood (typically reindeer blood), water or pilsner, flour and eggs. It is similar to black pudding, but is thinner and crispier.

Blodplättar may be fried in a frying pan. The pancakes are usually served with crushed lingonberries or lingonberry jam, sometimes with pork or reindeer meat.

In Swedish, the word may also be used to refer to blood platelets.

Blodplättar tastes very similar to black pudding, has a bone marrow flavor, and has a rich, fatty texture.

== See also ==
- Blodpalt
