= Kochwurst =

German pre-cooked sausage

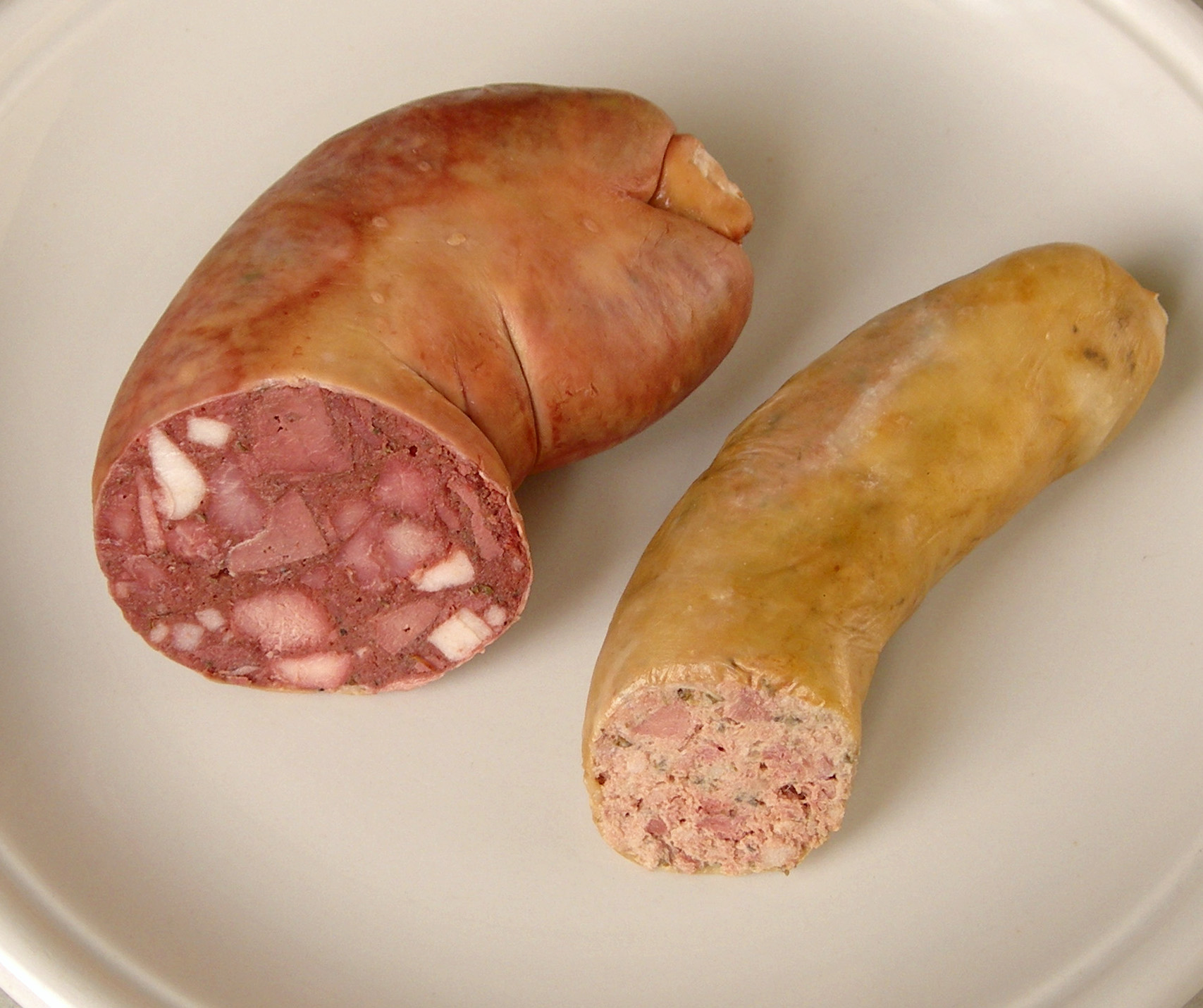
Smoked Blutwurst and smoked Hessian Leberwurst, both in natural casings (intestines)

Kochwurst is the name given to the German pre-cooked sausage, a class of sausage whose ingredients are largely cooked before the preparation of the sausage meat. The individual ingredients are held together by solidified fat (as in Streichwürste or string sausages), gelatine (as in Sulz - cured meat in gelatine) or blood proteins coagulated by heating (as in Blutwurst or blood sausage). In contrast with cooked sausages (Brühwurst), Kochwurst does not remain solid on heating, but more or less liquefies. After being filled into intestines, jars or tins, the whole sausage is cooked through again in hot water or steam.

In addition to meat, Kochwurst often contains also offal like liver or tongue, blood and, in the case of Grützwurst, cereal. Since the ingredients are easily perishable and Kochwurst does not usually last long, it was traditionally made on slaughtering days and is thus a usual ingredient of Schlachtplatte.

Also counted as Kochwurst are pies, known as Pasteten, which are cooked in square shapes. One speciality are Kochmettwürste such as the Palatine Saumagen, which are referred to as a type of Kochwurst.

In parts of northern Germany (e.g. in Schleswig-Holstein and Hamburg), the term Kochwurst is also used to refer to smoked Mettwurst and Kohlwurst, which is cooked in pots in order to be served as an accompaniment to Grünkohl, or to act as a soup ingredient.

== Varieties ==
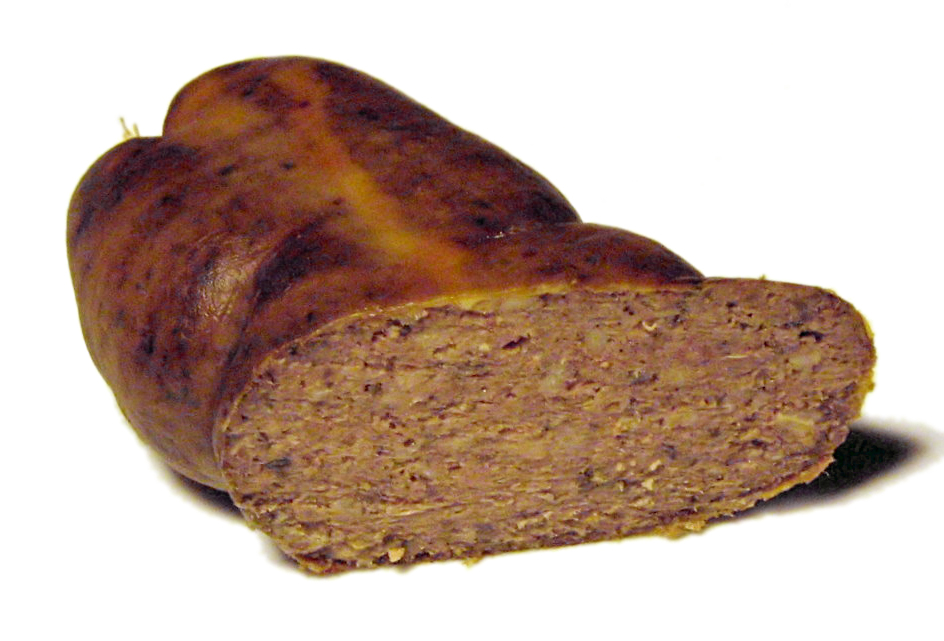
Smoked Leberwurst

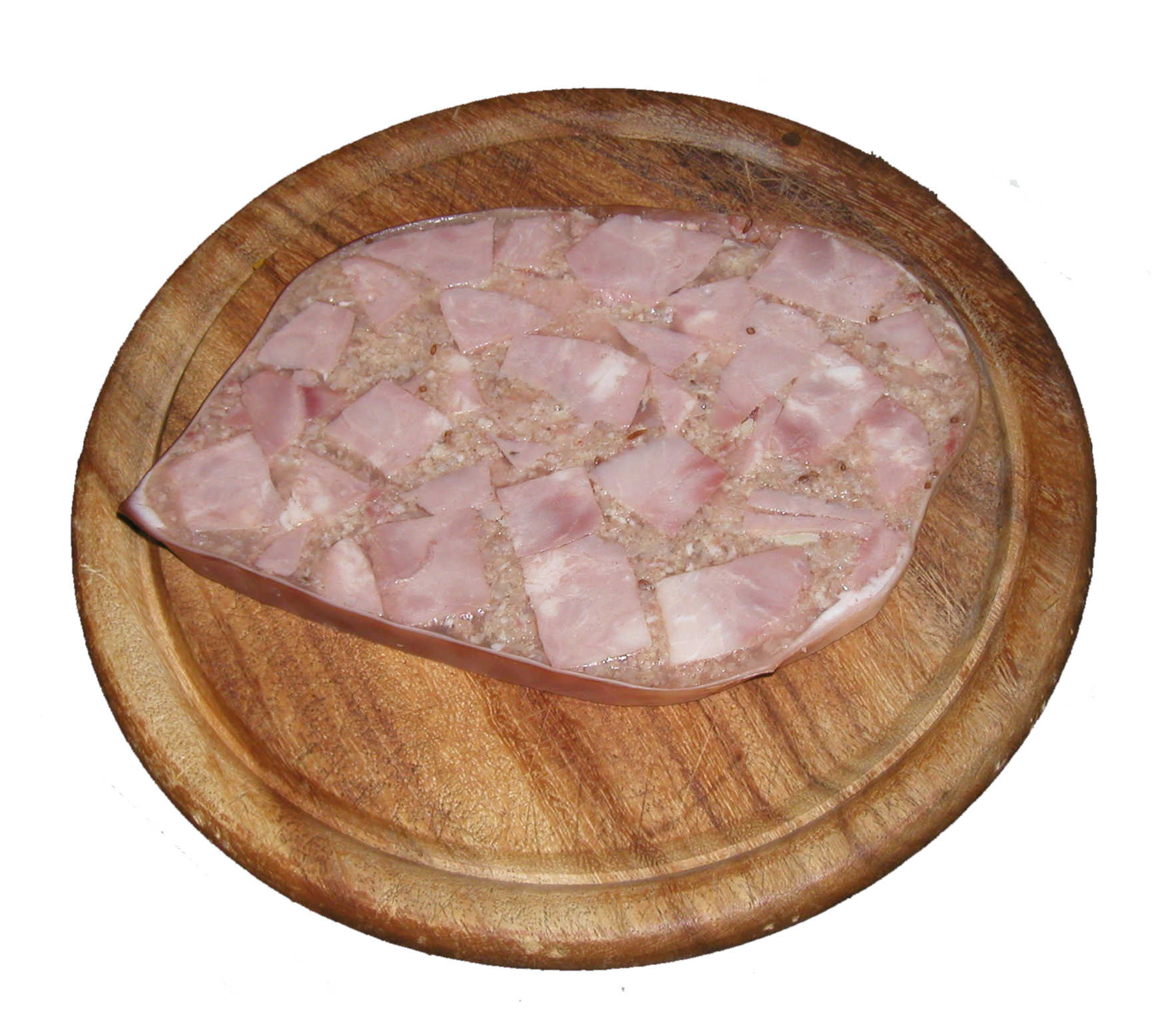
White Schwartenmagen

In Germany, the Kochwurst varieties are grouped as follows (with examples):

- Blutwurst
  - Beutelwurst
  - Gutsfleischwurst
  - Thüringer Rotwurst
  - Grützwurst
  - Fleischerblutwurst
  - Filetblutwurst
  - Hausmacherblutwurst
  - Schweinskopfblutwurst
  - Speckblutwurst
  - Leberrotwurst
  - Zungenblutwurst
- Kochstreichwurst
  - Leberwurst
    - Kalbsleberwurst
    - Leberbrot
    - Pfälzer Leberwurst
    - Delikatessleberwurst
    - Einfache Leberwurst
    - Feine Leberwurst
    - Gutsleberwurst
    - Hausmacher Leberwurst
    - Kassler Leberwurst
    - Landleberwurst
    - Zwiebelleberwurst
  - Kochmettwurst
    - Gekochte Mettwurst
    - Hamburger Gekochte
    - Zwiebelwurst
    - Pinkel
  - Pastete
- Sülzwurst
  - Schinkensülze
  - Presskopf
  - Corned Beef
  - Sächsische Weißwurst
  - Schwartenmagen
  - Schweinskopfsülzwurst
  - Sülzfleischwurst
  - Presswurst

== See also ==
- List of sausages
- List of smoked foods

== Sources ==
- Fleischverarbeitung, Berufsschullehrbuch, Leipzig 1978
