= Chouriço doce =

Portuguese blood sausage

Chouriço doce is a blood sausage prepared with pig blood, brown sugar or honey, cashew nuts and spices. Some versions are prepared using almonds. It has been stated that the dish requires six hours to prepare.

This is a traditional Portuguese dish from the area of Trás-os-Montes. The dish is served in the Sertão do Seridó communities of Rio Grande do Norte, Brazil as a main dish for a Christmas dinner.

== See also ==
- List of Portuguese dishes
- List of Brazilian sweets and desserts
- List of sausages
