= Flönz =

German blood sausage

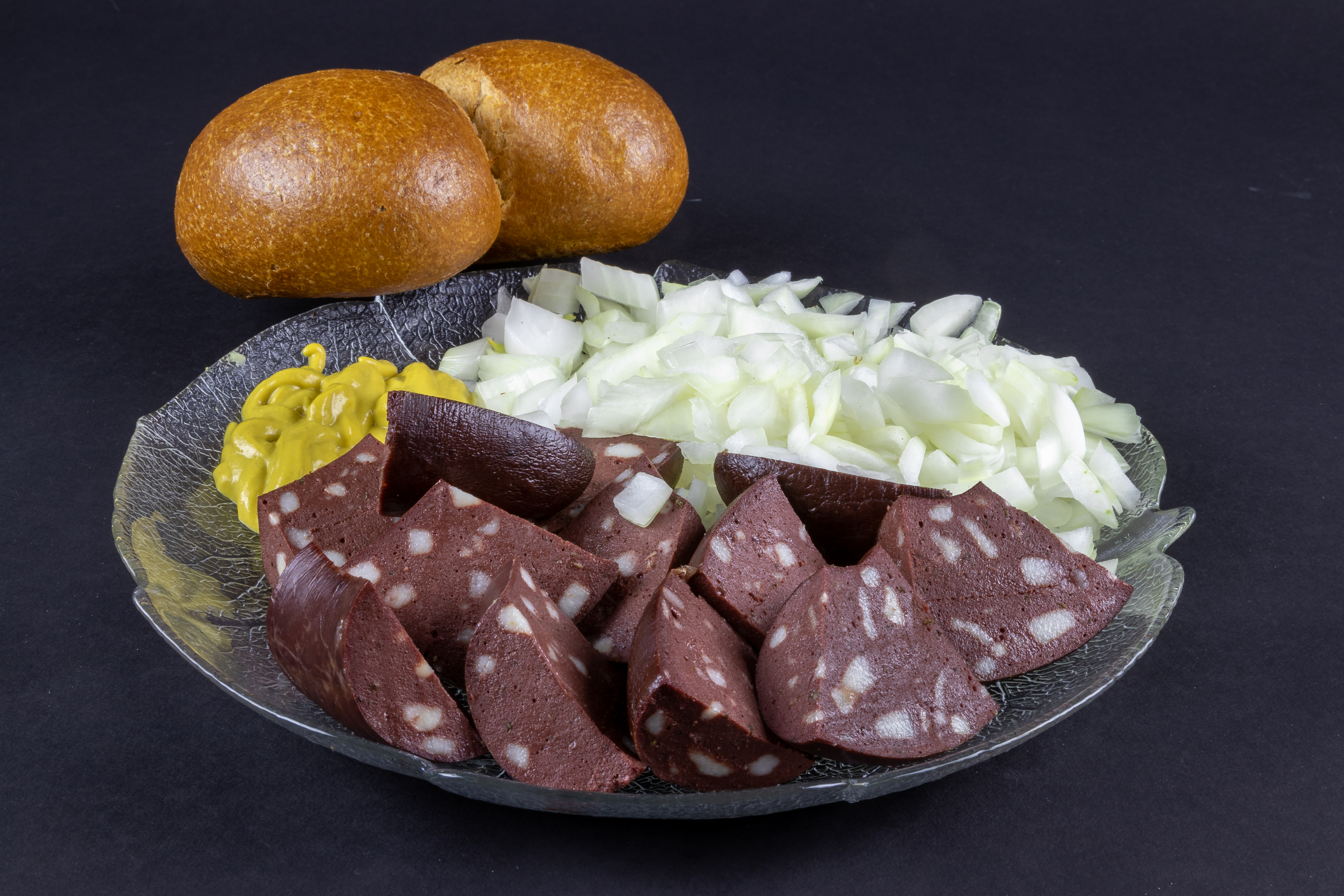
Traditional "Cologne Caviar": Röggelchen rolls, mustard, onion, and sliced flönz

Flönz (German: [flœnts]) is a type of fresh or smoked blood sausage popular in the Rhineland region of Germany. The sausage is red-brown on the outside, while it is also red-brown inside with visible specks of white pork fat. It is made from pork, various parts of pig such as rind, head, and pig's blood, with the addition of salt and natural spices.

Flönz is an ingredient in various local specialties like Himmel und Erde and Cologne Caviar.

In the European Union, flönz received a protected geographical indication (PGI) registration in 2016.
