= Mutura =

Kenyan blood sausage

Mutura Sausage
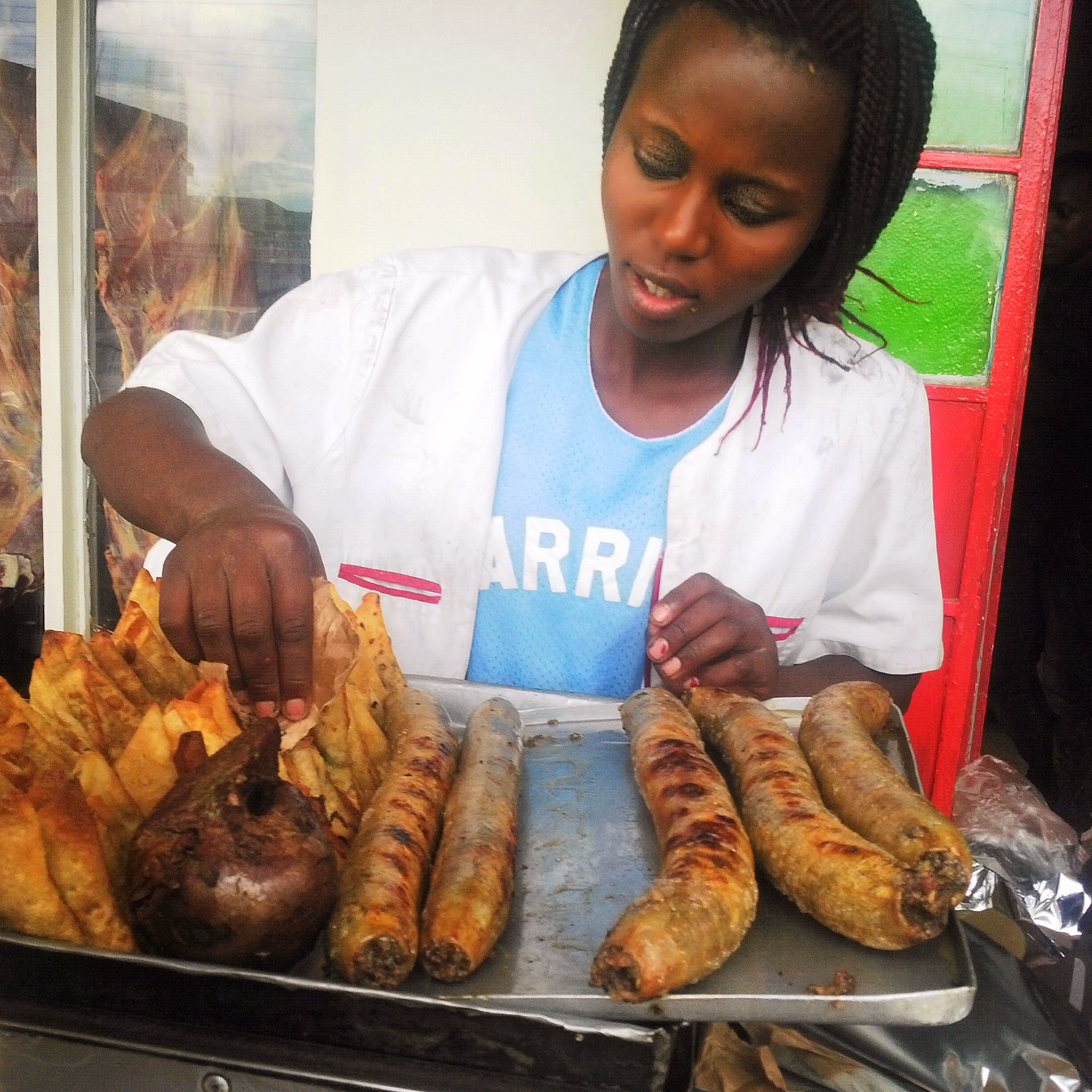
- Mutura on grill
- Place of origin: Kenya
- Main ingredients: Minced meat

Mutura is a type of traditional Kenyan blood sausage. It is commonly consumed as street food in Kenya. Mutura is made by stuffing an intestine casing with a mixture of minced or chopped beef or goat meat, tripe, and cooked cooled animal blood. The filling is typically seasoned with onions, salt, pepper, and chili. After preparation, the sausage is cooked, usually by grilling or roasting. The dish is widely associated with informal roadside food culture, where it is sold by street vendors, but it also holds cultural significance in events. Variations of mutura exists, with some using either goat or beef and different seasonings or avoiding blood all together.
