= Biroldo =

Type of Tuscan blood sausage

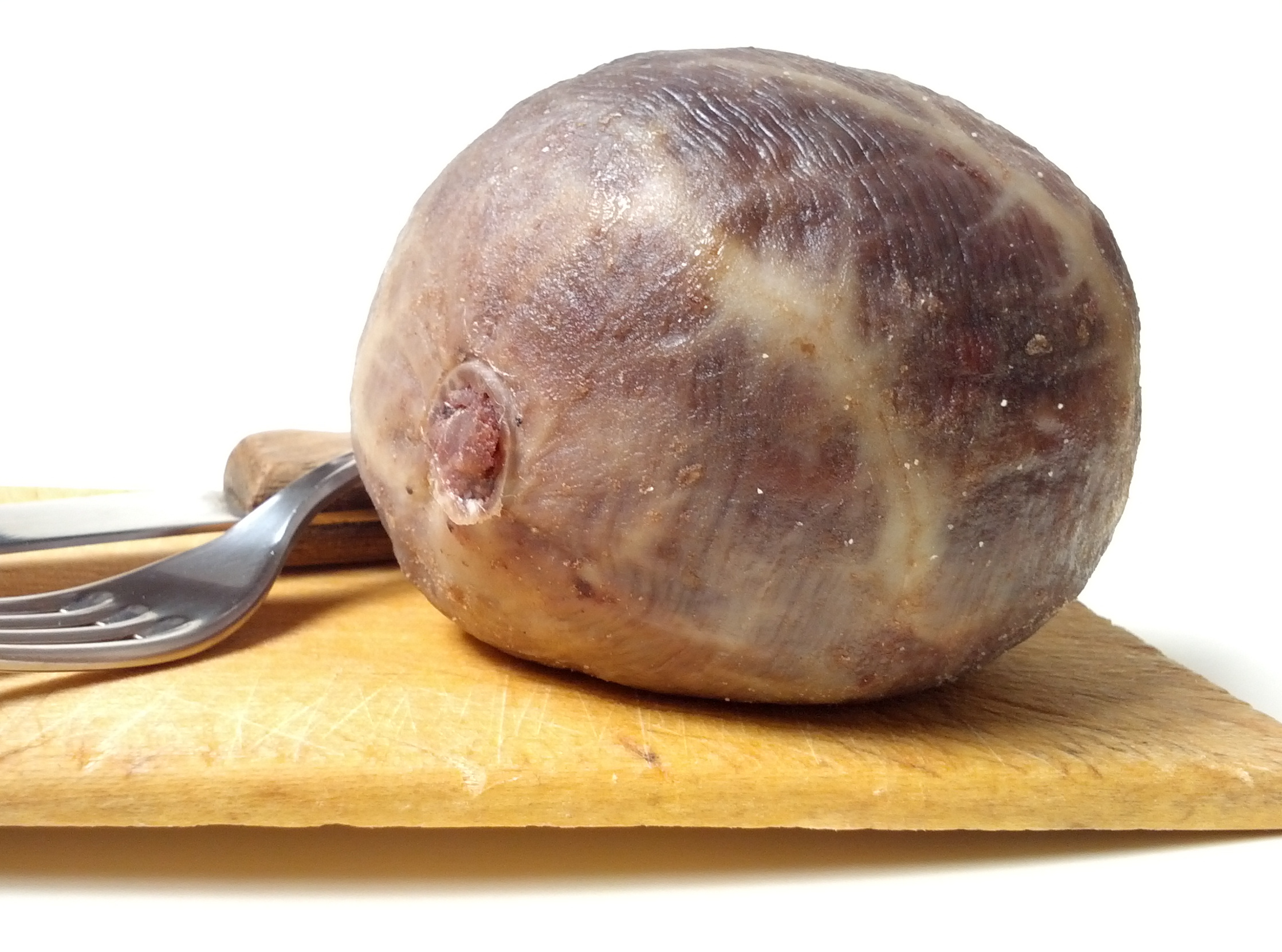
Biroldo

Biroldo is a very dark, brownish-red, soft-textured Tuscan blood sausage about 4 inches (10 cm) wide, with lighter-coloured chunks of meat and fat in it.

It was traditionally made from parts of the pig, offal such as the heart, lungs, and tongue, that wouldn't be used for other sausages. Because offal was used, the sausage would start being made as soon as the pig was slaughtered so that the taste of the offal would be at its freshest.

The offal is boiled, chopped, and seasoned with spices including cloves, star anise, cinnamon, nutmeg, fennel, and garlic. Pig's blood is added and it is formed into a sausage, using the pig's bladder or stomach as casing, which is cooked and then cooled with weights on top to press out the fat. It can be preserved in lard for 5 to 6 months, or eaten fresh within 8 to 10 days.

Biroldo made in Garfagnana, Lucca, Tuscany, differs from that made in the rest of the province of Lucca in that in Garfagnana the head is also used. This biroldo made in Garfagnana is sometimes called biroldo della Versilia, named after the Versilian Riviera, which is the strip of Tuscan coast starting at Forte dei Marmi in Lucca and stretching down 20 km south to Torre del Lago Puccini. The Garfagnana mountain range is in the Tuscan province of Lucca. The cities of Barga and Castelnuovo are in it.

Garfagnana biroldo is not really exported, even out of the area: almost all produced (90%) is eaten right in Garfagnana.

In Pistoia, Tuscany, a sweeter version uses pine nuts, sultanas and pig's blood. For their savoury version, the Pistoians use calf's blood, and cheese.

== See also ==
Media related to Biroldo at Wikimedia Commons
