= Blood sausage =

Traditional sausage dish

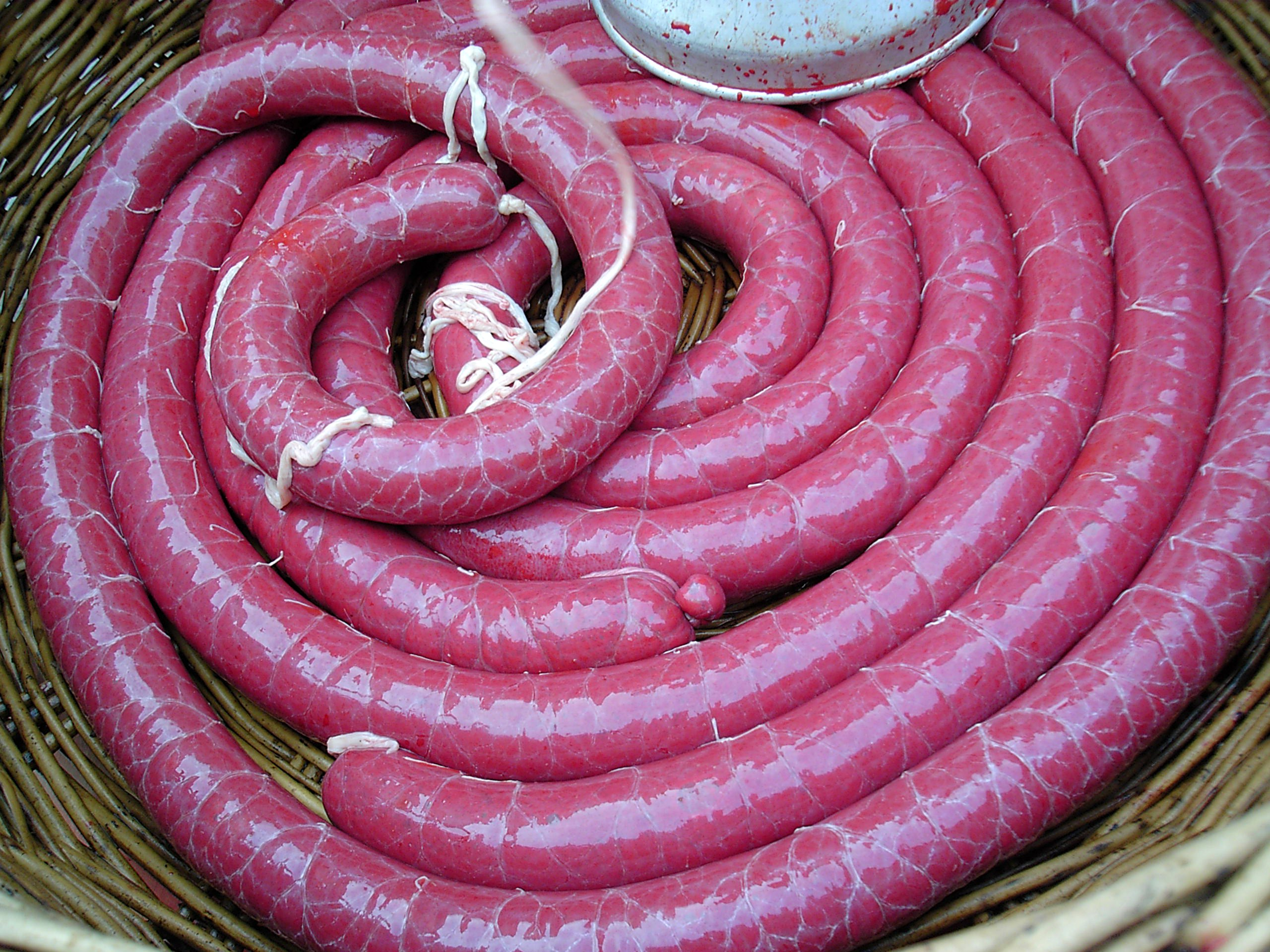
- French blood sausage (boudin noir), before cooking
- Alternative names: Blood pudding, black pudding, blutwurst
- Serving temperature: Hot
- Main ingredients: Blood, grains, meat products, onions, spices

Blood sausage
Nutritional value per 100 g (3.5 oz)
- Energy: 1,586 kJ (379 kcal)
- Carbohydrates: 1 g
- Sugars: 1 g
- Fat: 35 g
- Protein: 15 g
Vitamins and minerals
| Minerals | Quantity %DV^{†} |
| Iron | 36% 6.4 mg |
| Sodium | 30% 680 mg |
- This is one of many types of blood sausage, likely with a large amount of added bacon.
- ^{†}Percentages estimated using US recommendations for adults.

A blood sausage is a sausage filled with blood that is cooked or dried and mixed with a filler until it is thick enough to solidify when cooled. Most commonly, the blood of pigs, sheep, lamb, cow, chicken, or goose is used.

In Europe and the Americas, typical fillers include meat, fat, suet, bread, cornmeal, onion, chestnuts, barley, oatmeal, and buckwheat. On the Iberian Peninsula and in Latin America and Asia, fillers are often made with rice. Sweet variants with sugar, honey, orange peel, and spices are also regional specialties.

In many languages, a general term such as blood sausage (American English) is used for all sausages that are made from blood, whether or not they include non-animal material such as bread, cereal, and nuts. Sausages that include such material are often referred to with more specific terms, such as black pudding in English. Other varieties of blood sausage include boudin rouge (Creole and Cajun), rellena or moronga (Mexico), and sanganel (Friuli).

== Africa ==
=== Kenya ===
Mutura is a traditional blood sausage dish among the people of urban Kenyan regions, although recently its popularity has spread throughout Kenya. It is made with meat, blood, and spices all encased in the animal's intestines or stomach. In Kenya fillers include fresh minced goat, beef, mutton, fat, and red onions.

Nowadays many types of mutura, especially commercial street food versions, do not contain blood. The meat used in the filling can be any fleshy part, but like any other type of sausage, prime cuts are not ordinarily used for the stuffing. Instead the tougher, leaner cuts – for example the neck – are trimmed off the bone. The casing for the stuffing is the stomach sac and larger intestines. These are flushed many times with water to clean them.

The meat for the stuffing is finely chopped or minced, and the mandatory fat is often trimmed from other parts. The meat is slightly fried, mixed with finely chopped red onions, salt and optionally fresh chili. Other additions include freshly chopped coriander (dhania or cilantro), garlic, pepper, and even beef stock. This is then mixed thoroughly with the fresh blood from the animal, and stuffed into the stomach and intestines, with the openings sewn or tied together with string.

The sausage is boiled in a large pot (often with other parts of the animal not roasted and used to make soup) for 30–45 minutes, and roasted over coals till brown. Sliced, it is served with kachumbari, an onion-based salad consisting of tomatoes, red onions and fresh coriander, a bit of chili and squeeze of lemon. The accompanying starch is ugali.

== Americas ==
Morcilla is served in many areas of Latin America. Morcilla is sometimes made with a filler of rice and onions and seasoned with paprika and other spices.

=== North America ===
==== United States ====
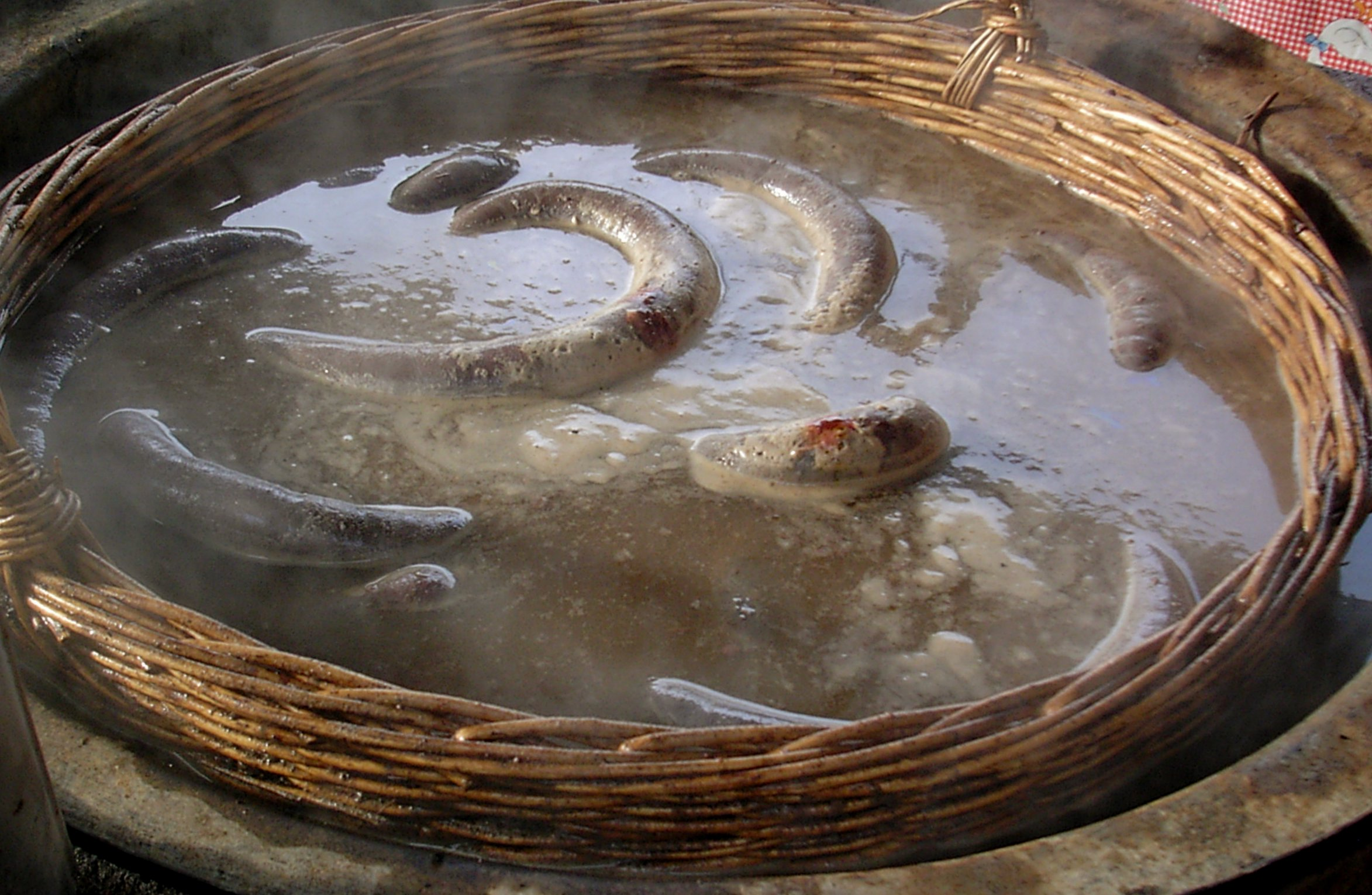
Boiling boudin rouge (red pudding), a Cajun sausage

In the U.S. territory of Puerto Rico, blood sausage is known as morcilla. Puerto Rican blood sausage is made with rice, culantro, cilantro, garlic, and cubanelle pepper. Some contain paprika and annatto. Morcilla is especially popular during Christmas.

Blood sausages are very difficult to find in US supermarkets. Brussels and Sturgeon Bay, Wisconsin, are both home to local grocers who produce blood sausage, due to their large Belgian American populations. Supermarkets throughout Maine also carry locally produced blood pudding due to the state's large French Canadian population. In southeastern Michigan, Polish-style kaszanka can be found in supermarkets throughout the year and is very popular.

An Italian-American version of blood sausage in the San Francisco Bay Area is called biroldo and has pine nuts, raisins, spices, and pig snouts and is made using either pig's or cow's blood. German-style blood sausage and Zungenwurst can be found in Fresno and Santa Rosa, where Russian and Armenian delis offer a wide range of Central European foods. Alpine Village in Torrance, California, used to have Blutwurst due to a considerable German-American population in the South Bay area of Los Angeles County.

Cajun boudin is a fresh sausage made with green onions, pork, pork liver (making it somewhat gritty or grainy), and rice. Pig's blood was sometimes added to produce boudin rouge, but this tradition became increasingly rare after the mid-twentieth century due to the decline of the boucherie (traditional communal butchering) and government health regulations prohibiting the transportation of raw blood. As a result, Cajun boudin is now usually made without blood; however, blood or "black" boudin can still be purchased.

==== Mexico ====
In the Yucatán Peninsula, morcilla is made exclusively from pig's blood and once deep fried it is served with a mix of pickled onions, cilantro and spices. It is always consumed in the form of tacos and paired with fresh habanero peppers.

In Central Mexico, morcilla is known as moronga.

=== Central America and the Caribbean ===
==== Caribbean ====
In Antigua, rice pudding is a local delicacy and it is prepared the same way as blood sausage.

In Barbados, blood sausage, also called pudding, is made with sweet potato (batata), pig's blood and onions, seasoned with peppers and other herbs and stuffed in pig intestines. Traditionally pig's blood was used to darken the mixture but Browning sauce (caramelized sugar) is sometimes used as a substitute. It is normally served with souse, which is pickled pig's feet, pig's ears and other trimmings. The cooked meat is cut into bite-sized pieces and soaked in a brine made of water, lime juice, cucumbers, hot pepper, and specially prepared seasonings. Blood sausage and souse, more commonly known as pudding and souse, is a Bajan delicacy usually prepared on weekends and special occasions.

In the French Antilles, boudin créole, or boudin antillais is very popular, this being the French boudin noir with local Caribbean chilli and other spices.

In Trinidad and Tobago, the local style of blood sausage is heavily seasoned with local peppers and traditionally prepared from pig's blood, often replaced by pig's liver today. It is sold by local producers as a popular accompaniment to rolls of crusty hops bread or served as an accompaniment to trotter souse, a stew based on trotters.

In the U.S. territory of Puerto Rico, it is served fried and mostly consumed during the holidays.

==== Central America ====
In Panama, blood sausage is called morcilla, rellena or tubería negra, and is usually filled with rice.

In El Salvador and Nicaragua, it is called moronga. In Honduras and Guatemala both moronga and morcilla are used.

In Costa Rica, blood sausage is called morcilla or moronga; but unlike the rest of Latin America, it does not contain rice or other cereals, it is similar to the German blood sausage called Blutwurst.

=== South America ===
==== Andean ====
In Ecuador, Bolivia and Colombia the blood sausage is also called morcilla, and is usually filled with rice.

In Colombia, morcilla can have rice, green peas, cilantro or culantro, and is often eaten as an appetizer called picada or with the traditional dishes bandeja paisa or fritanga. In Venezuela, morcilla is often served with parrilla (barbecue).

==== Argentina, Uruguay, Paraguay ====
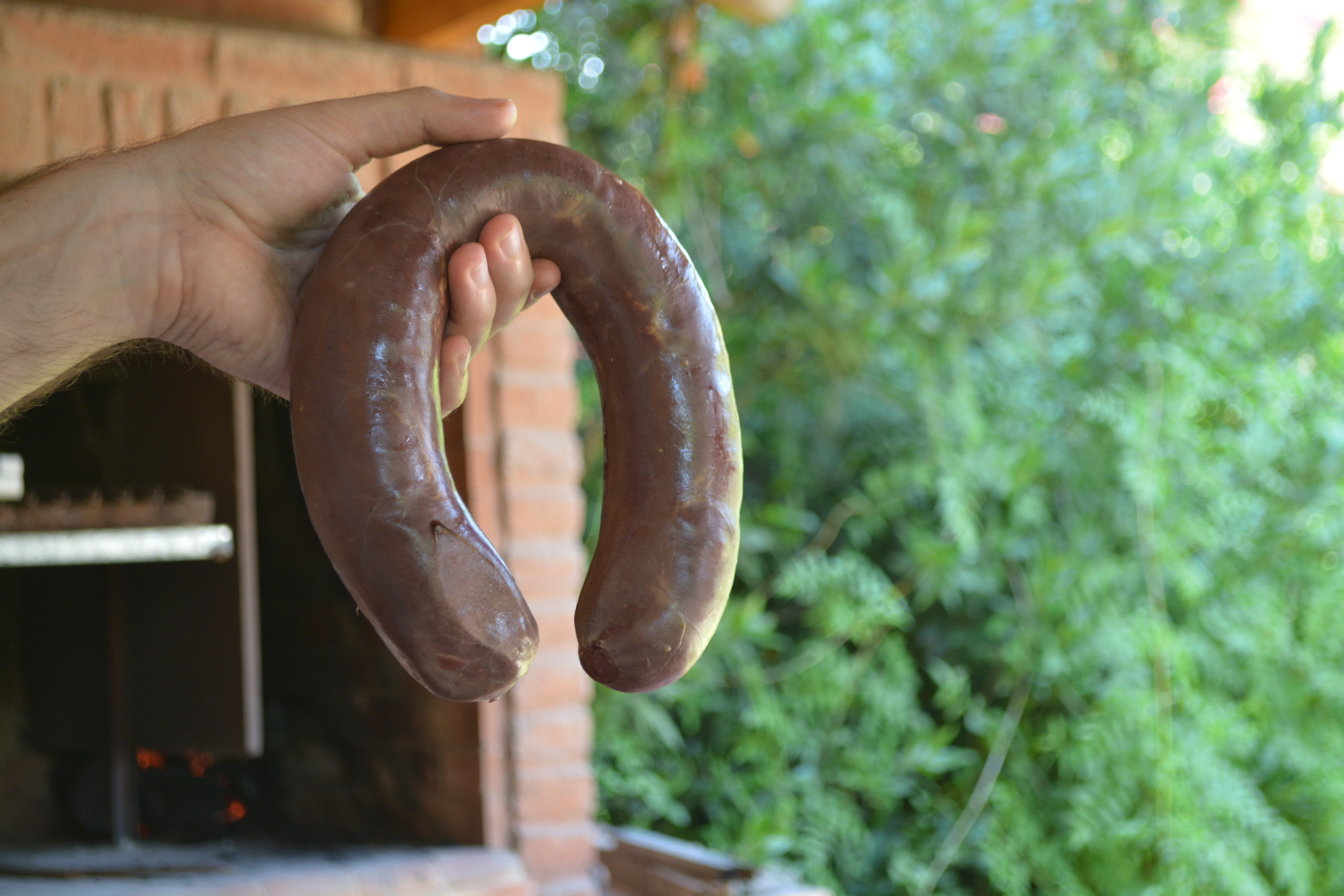
Morcilla for Argentine asado

Morcilla is also eaten inside a sandwich called "morcipán", especially in the Río de la Plata. Morcilla is a component of the asado criollo, a regional mixed grill or barbecue meal. In Uruguay and in Argentina, a sweet version, usually called morcilla vasca, including raisins and pine nuts is popular; some vendors even add chocolate, caramelised orange peels, peanuts, and other dried fruits. Uruguayans usually are fond of sweet or salty morcilla, and most restaurants and supermarkets carry both versions. In Paraguay, it is mostly known under the name mbusia, a guaranization of the word morcilla.

==== Brazil ====
In Brazil there is a version of the blood sausage called chouriço, morcilha, or morcela (sometimes the Castilian Spanish version morcilla is used as well), consisting of a fresh sausage made of the blood and fat from pork and usually rice. It is a variation of the Portuguese blood sausage, and it is known for its deep dark color. In some regions, it is popular on barbecues (Churrascos) as a starter. Like in Uruguay, sweet blood sausage is also popular, known as chouriço doce.

==== Chile ====
In Chile, the blood sausage is called "prieta" (a synonym of "negra", black) and tends to have a very thick skin, so is eaten cut open lengthwise. Apart from blood and a little fat, "prietas" may contain a variety of ingredients, such as chopped onion and spices, cabbage, peppers, watercress, rice, meat or even dried fruit or nuts. "Prietas" or "morcillas" are part of the Chilote tradition of "reitimiento" involving the slaughter and preparation of a pig.

Prietas are easily found at supermarkets throughout the country and are available from practically any butcher.

==== Guianas ====
In Guyana, blood sausage is a very popular snack served at social occasions, and as "cutters" when drinking. The main ingredient is cooked rice seasoned with herbs, such as thyme and basil. The rice is mixed with cow's blood, stuffed into cow's or pig's intestine, and boiled until firm, sliced and served with Sour (a mild type of dipping sauce with hot peppers). White pudding is also made.

In Suriname, blood sausage is known by the Dutch name bloedworst, and white pudding by the equally Dutch name vleesworst.

== Asia ==
Across Asia, various people create food from congealed animal blood. Most of these food types do not have casings and might be considered a version of sliced sausage.

=== East Asia ===
==== Hong Kong ====
In Hong Kong, the dish closest to blood sausage is pig blood curd, which is only made from pig's blood and is not considered a sausage.

==== Korea ====
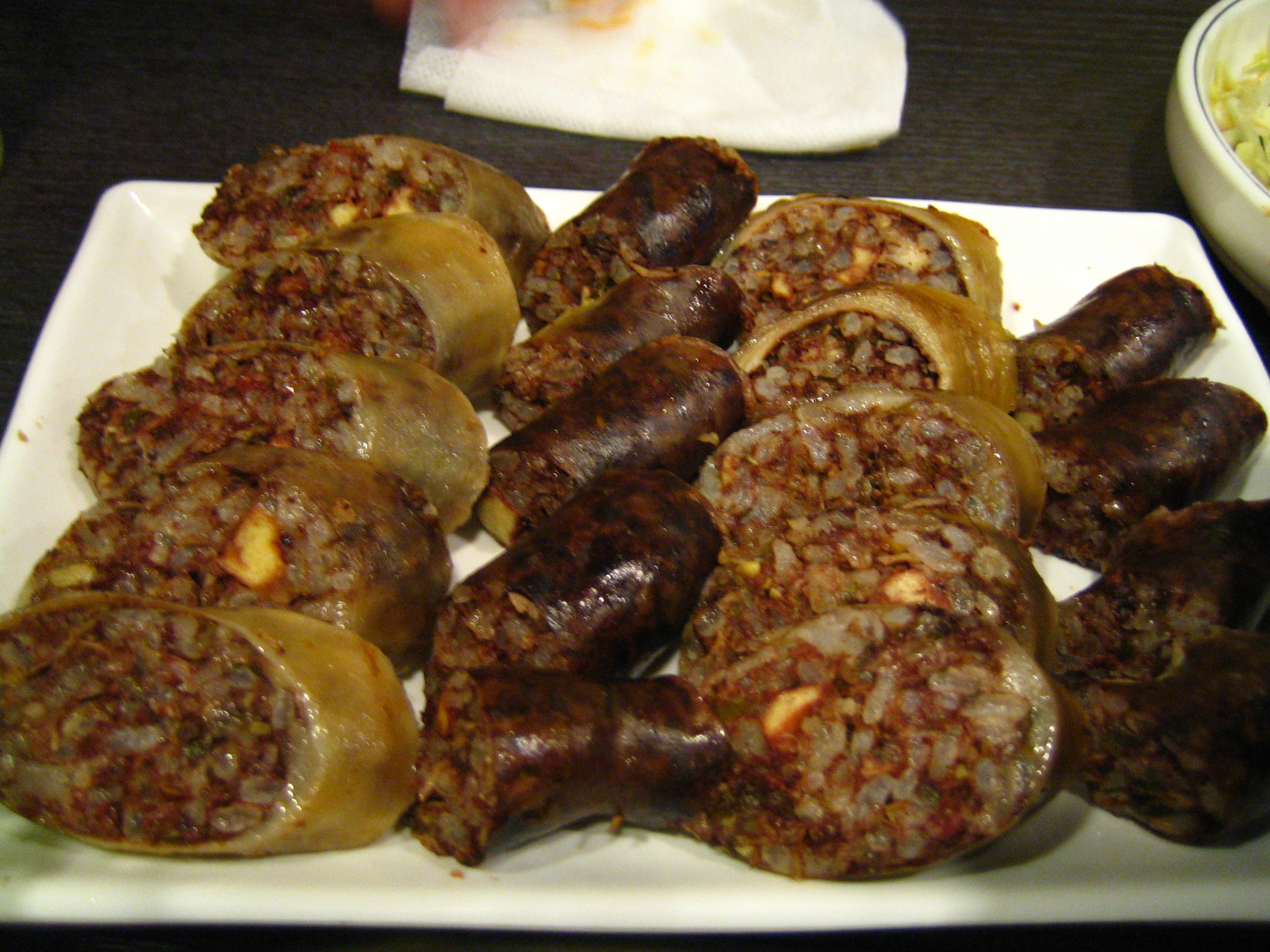
Sundae, a Korean blood sausage

The majority of Korea's sundae (순대) can be categorised as blood sausage. The most common type of sundae is made of sweet potato noodle (dangmyeon), barley, and pig's blood, but some variants contain sesame leaves, green onion, fermented soy paste (doenjang), sweet rice, kimchi, and bean sprouts, in addition to the common ingredients. The Korean sundae is wrapped with pig's intestines. The addition of sweet potato noodle is a more modern addition to the dish.

==== China ====
In Chinese cuisines, whole coagulated blood is fried or steamed as a snack or cooked in a hot pot. In mainland China, "blood tofu" (Chinese: 血豆腐; pinyin: xuě dòufǔ), or "red tofu" (Chinese: 红豆腐; pinyin: hóng dòufǔ), is most often made with pig's or duck's blood. Like the above dishes, this has no casing but is simply cut into rectangular pieces and cooked.

In Northeast China, the "blood sausage" was a traditional food which is cooked with sheep or goat blood.

In Tibet, congealed yak's blood is a traditional food. Chinese people also used pig blood curd that was consumed by laborers in Kaifeng over 1,000 years ago in the south of China.

In Tibetan cuisine, sausages or gyurma refer to blood sausages and are made with yak or sheep's blood which may or may not include either rice or roasted barley flour as filler. The sausage uses natural casing employing the use of yak or sheep's intestine.

==== Mongolia ====
The Yasa permitted the eating of animal blood and entrails, which was previously forbidden, and blood sausage is now popular in Mongolia.

Today, Mongolian blood sausage is sometimes prepared using the khorkhog method.

==== Japan ====
The general Japanese term for blood sausage is kecchōzume (血腸詰め). After the introduction of agriculture from the Asian continent in ancient times, Japanese culture was traditionally averse to blood. As a result, blood-based foods are uncommon in Japanese cuisine.

Before 1945, remote villages in Tochigi Prefecture (formerly Shimotsuke Province) were known to produce soresore (それゝゝ), a blood sausage made by filling tied-off sections of deer or bear intestine with the animal's blood and boiling them in a metal pot over an open fire until the blood coagulated. Once the blood had solidified, the sausage was cut into circular slices and served with soy sauce. Matagi hunters of the former Dewa and Mutsu Provinces are known to have made blood sausage using deer intestine and hoshii (糒しい), or dehydrated boiled rice, as filler. The Japanese are believed to have first discovered Jurchen blood sausage during the Hamgyong campaign in 1592.

==== Taiwan ====
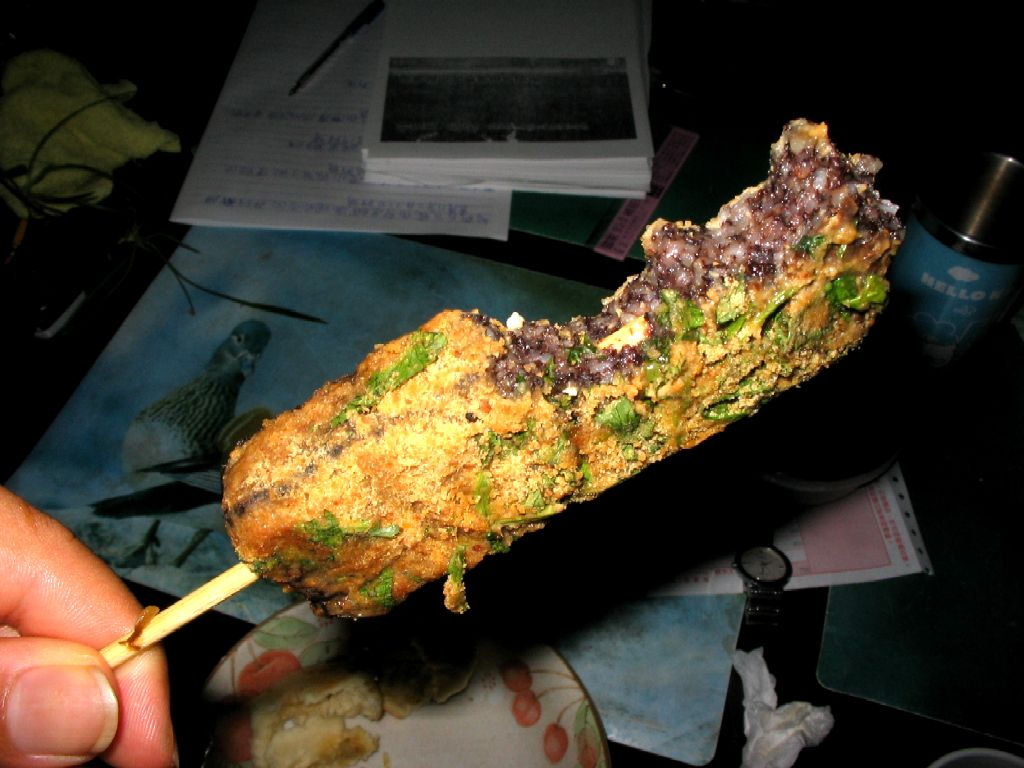
Zhuxuegao, or pork blood cake, on a stick

In Taiwan, "pig's blood cake" (Chinese: 豬血糕; pinyin: zhū xuě gāo; Pe̍h-ōe-jī: ti-hoeh-ko; Zhuyin Fuhao: ㄓㄨˉ ㄒㄧㄝˇ ㄍㄠˉ) or "rice blood cake" (Chinese: 米血糕; Zhuyin Fuhao: ㄇㄧˇ ㄒㄧㄝˇ ㄍㄠˉ), made of pork blood and sticky rice, is served on a popsicle stick; this is a very popular snack at local night markets.

=== Southeast Asia ===
==== Indonesia ====
In Bali, urutan is a version of blood sausage made with pork intestine and pork blood. It is served with rice.

Another version in Java called saren or dideh, is made with chicken's blood and usually cut into small cube pieces.

In Sumatra, kidu-kidu is a Batak sausage dish made from pork intestines, served with sauce made from pork's blood and spices such as andaliman pepper.

==== Malaysia ====
In Penang or other northern states, pig blood curd (known locally in Penang Hokkien as "too huet"; Chinese: 豬血; pinyin: zhū xuě; lit. 'pig's blood') is usually served with the local street-food specialty curry mee (curry noodles). It can also be mixed with some traditional Hokkien dishes as well.

==== Philippines ====
Blood sausage is known generically as longganisang dugô (lit. "blood longaniza") in the Philippines. A notable native, precolonial blood sausage is pinuneg, made from minced pork meat and innards in a casing of pigs’ large intestine, prepared in the Cordillera Administrative Region.

==== Thailand ====
In Thai cuisine sai krok lueat (Thai: ไส้กรอกเลือด) is a blood sausage (Thai: sai krok = sausage, Thai: lueat = blood), often served sliced and accompanied by a spicy dipping sauce. "Blood tofu" is simply called lueat (Thai: เลือด, blood) in Thailand. This can be used in many Thai dishes such as in noodle soups, Thai curries, or as an addition to certain rice dishes such as Khao man kai.

==== Vietnam ====
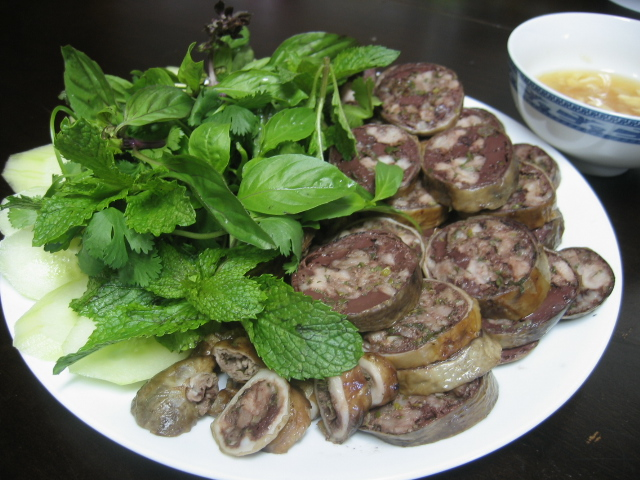
Dồi, Vietnamese blood sausage

Vietnamese dồi tiết (Northern) or dồi huyết (Southern) is blood sausage, boiled or fried, made with pork blood, pork fat and basil.

=== South Asia ===
==== India ====
In Meghalayan cuisine, doh snam is type of blood sausage made from pork intestine with local spices and ingredients.

==== Nepal ====
In Limbu cuisine, sargemba or sargyangma is a type of blood sausage made mostly from pork intestines, pork fat, rice and yangben, a type of edible wild lichen.

=== Siberia ===
Khaan (sausage) (ru:Хаан (блюдо)) - a pre-Islamic blood sausage of Turkic peoples, nowadays made only by the Sakha people, as blood sausages are prohibited in Islam.

== Europe ==
=== Central and Eastern Europe ===
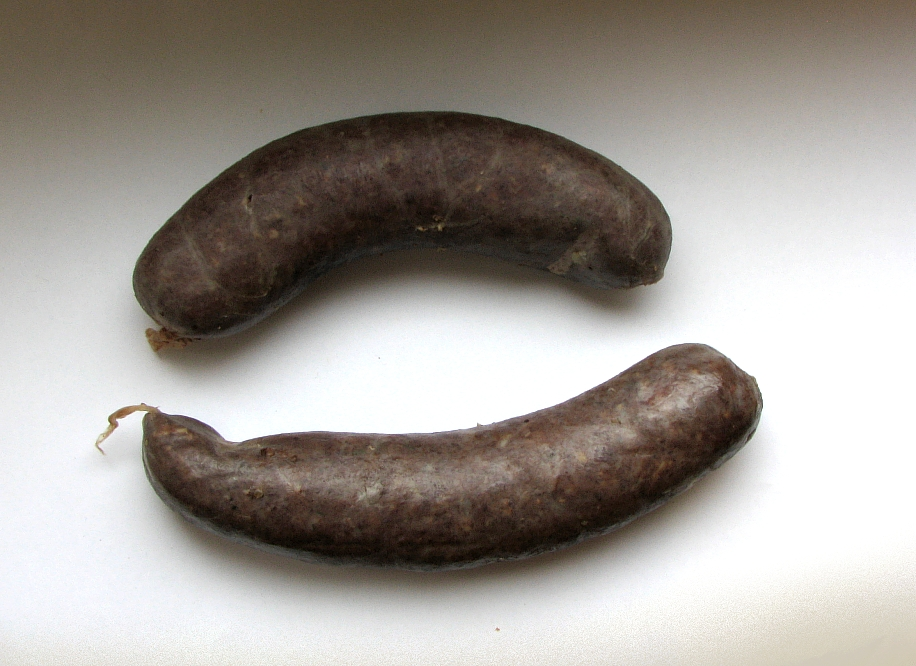
Polish kaszanka

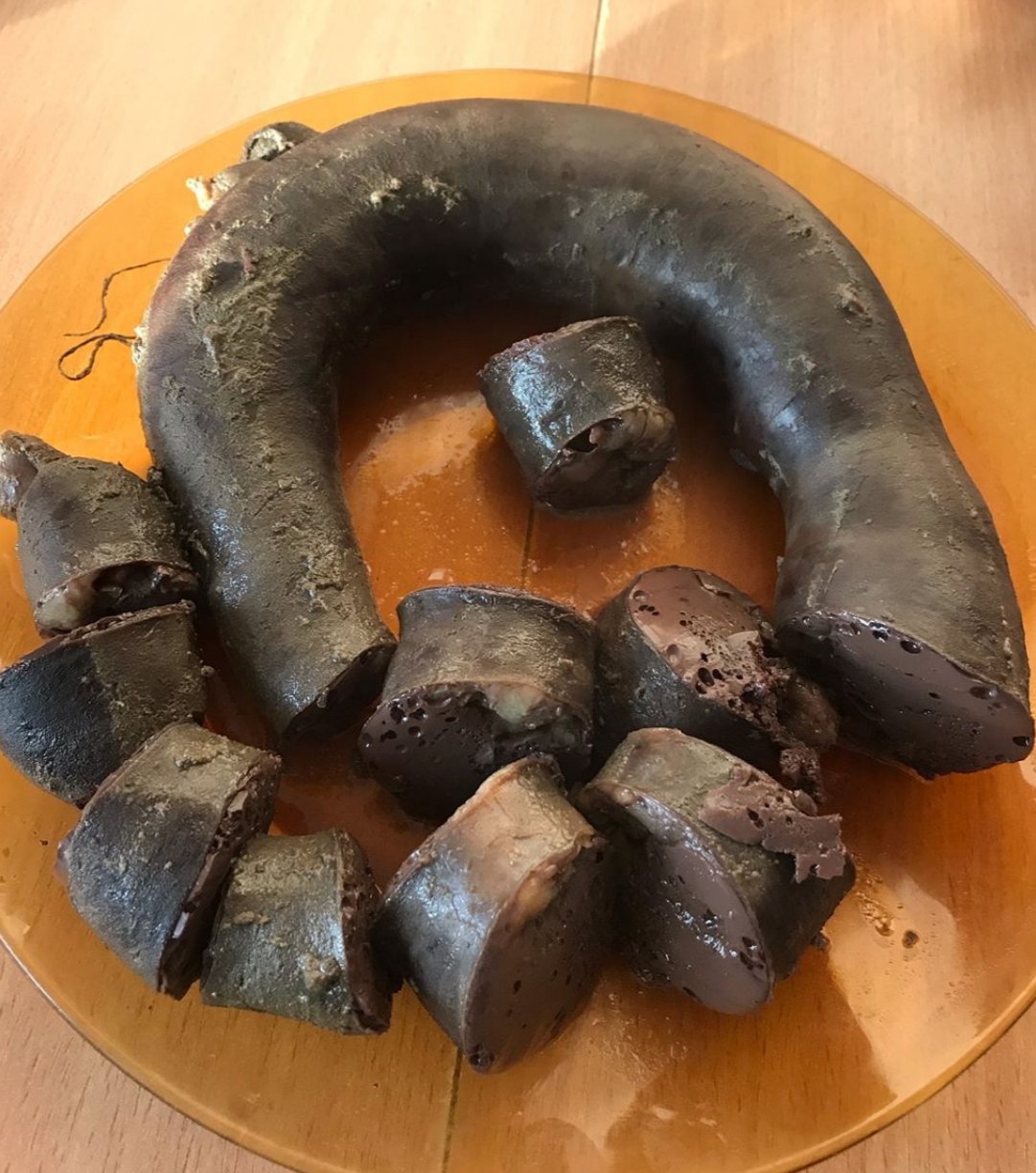
Blood sausage made in Buryatia, Russia

Throughout Central and Eastern Europe, blood sausage, known as kishka (meaning "intestine"), is made with pig's blood and buckwheat kasha. It is also known in Russia as krovyanka (кровянка), or krovyanaya kolbasa (кровяная колбаса, literally "blood sausage") and includes buckwheat as a main filler, instead of oats or oatmeal. In Belarus it's called kryvianaja kaŭbasa (крывяная каўбаса) or kryvianka (крывянка). In Ukraine it's called krov'yanka (кров'янка) or kryvava kyshka (кривава кишка), and kiszka or kaszanka in Poland; krvavnička in Slovakia and krvavica in Slovenia, krupniok in Silesia. Polish salceson ("black" and "Brunszwicki") are a type of head cheese ("brawn") that contains blood. In Hungary, véres hurka is typically made with pig's blood and barleycorn or cubed bread (typically zsemle) as filler as such also known as zsemlés hurka and gerslis hurka. In Bulgaria, karvavitsa (кървавица) is usually prepared with pig's blood, fat and a variety of mountain herbs and spices and eaten warm during the winter.

In Romania, the traditional sângerete (from sânge, "blood" in Romanian) is made from shoulder butt pork meat, pork blood and a filler such as pre-boiled rice seasoned with pepper, garlic and basil. It has many regional variants, but the most common are the sângerete from Transylvania.

Similarly, in Czech cuisine, jelito is made from second-rate pork, pig's blood and peeled barley; the stuffing served by itself, unformed, is called prejt.

=== Northern Europe ===
==== Denmark ====
In Denmark, blodpølse is made from pigs's blood and suet, rye flour, brown sugar, raisins, salt, cinnamon and cardamom stuffed into natural or artificial intestines. It is usually boiled in its skin, eaten hot or cold, sometimes sliced and fried, served with syrup, cinnamon and stewed apples.

==== Estonia ====
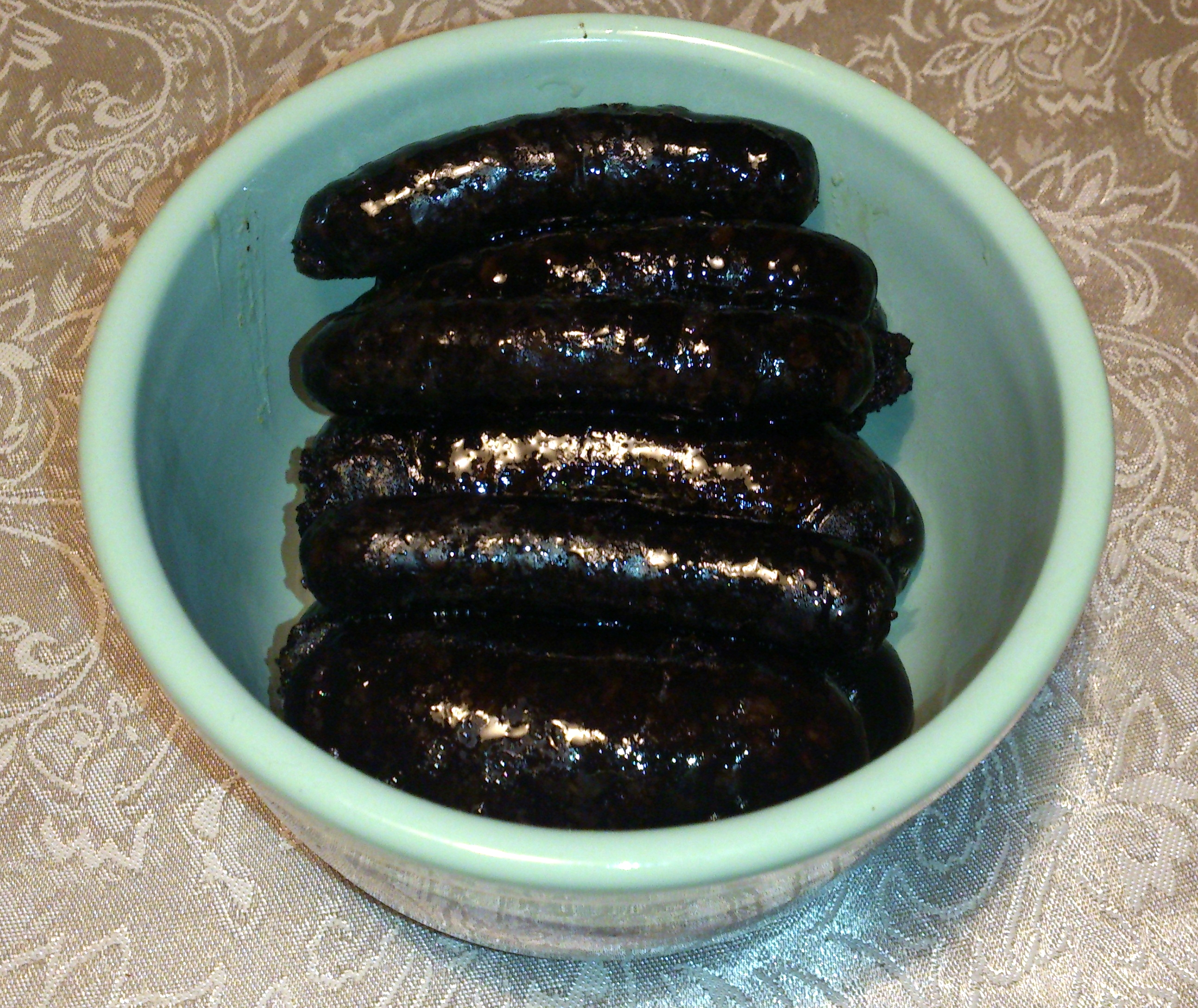
Oven-cooked Estonian verivorst

In Estonia, verivorst (blood sausage) is made of pig's blood, barley groats, pork, marjoram and other flavourings. It is sold and eaten mostly in winter, being a traditional Christmas food. At that time there is a large variety of verivorst in stores, ranging in shapes and sizes. Verivorst is usually cooked in an oven, but sometimes also fried in a pan. Verivorst is often eaten together with lingonberry jam, but occasionally also with butter or sour cream. Another similar dish is called verikäkk (black pudding, or blood dumpling, depending on the shape). The popularity of verikäkk has decreased during the past decades (possibly because of its less appealing commercial appearance) and has mostly been substituted by verivorst.

==== Finland ====
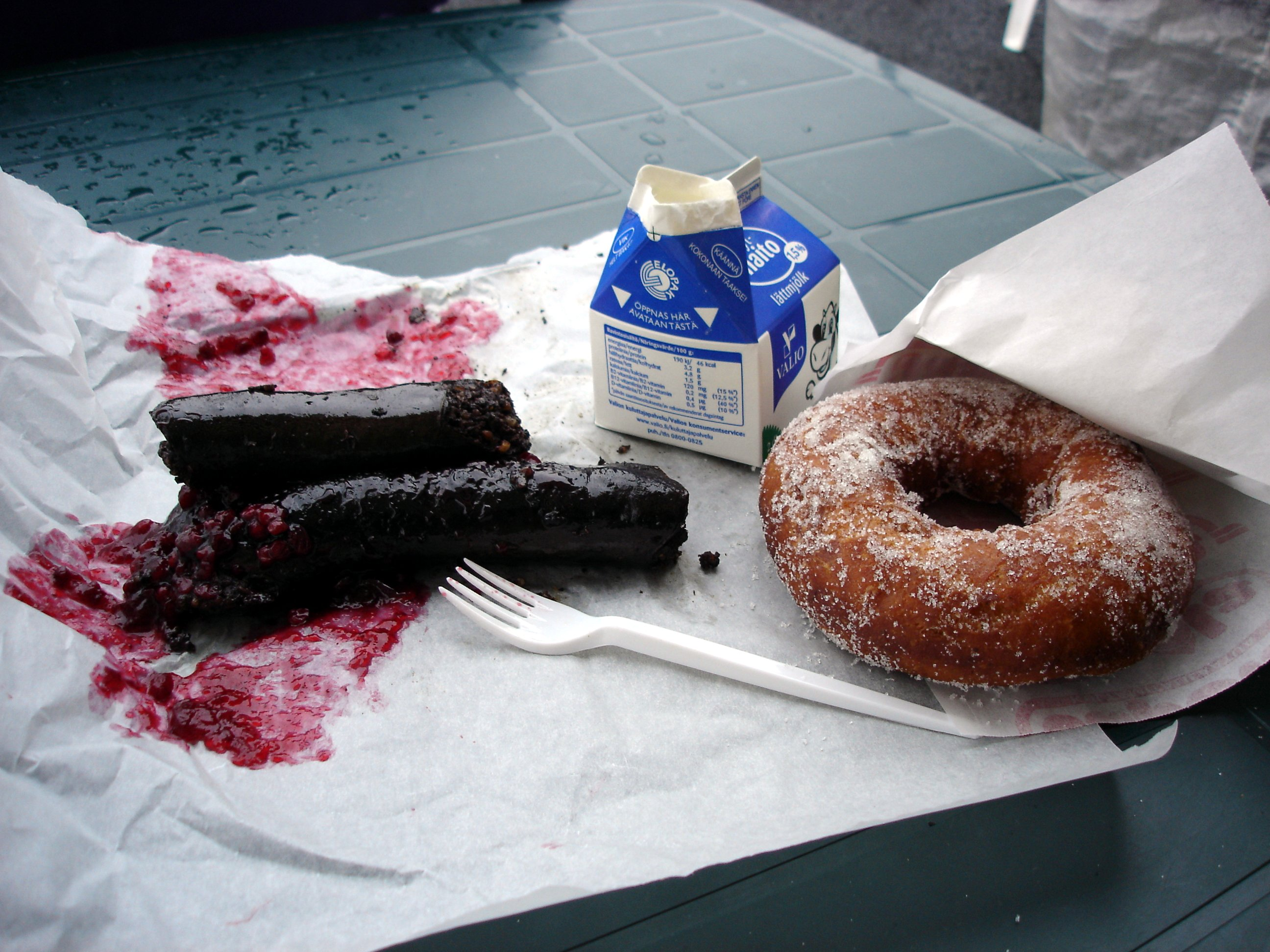
Mustamakkara with lingonberry jam, milk, and a doughnut

Mustamakkara (literally "black sausage") is a roasted sausage containing pig's blood and very similar to Estonian verivorst. The sausage is said to originate from Tampere and is considered an integral part of the city's culture.

A dish similar to the British black pudding is also made by making batter out of pig's blood and baking it like pancakes. Traditionally, rye flour or oatmeal is used and minced onion is added to the mix. This dish is called veriohukainen or verilettu (blood pancake). Rössypottu is a traditional soup in northern Finland with blood pudding as a main ingredient.

Most blood sausage dishes in Finland are often eaten with lingonberry jam to sweeten the taste.

==== Iceland ====
In Iceland, blóðmör is one of two types of slátur. It is made from lamb's blood and suet, rye flour and oats, traditionally stuffed into pouches sewn from the lamb's stomach. It is usually boiled in its skin, eaten hot or cold, sometimes sliced and fried. After cooking, it is often preserved in fermented whey and acquires a distinct sour taste.

==== Ireland and the United Kingdom ====
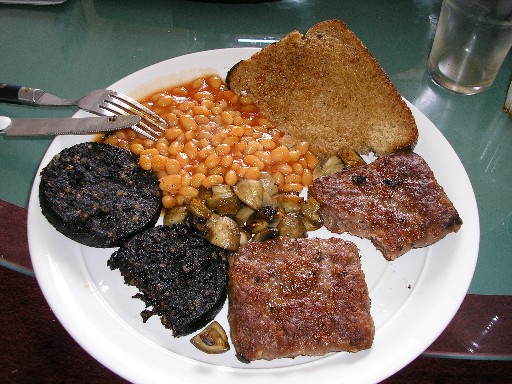
Scottish-style cooked breakfast, centred around black pudding (left), served with square sausage, baked beans, mushrooms, and fried bread

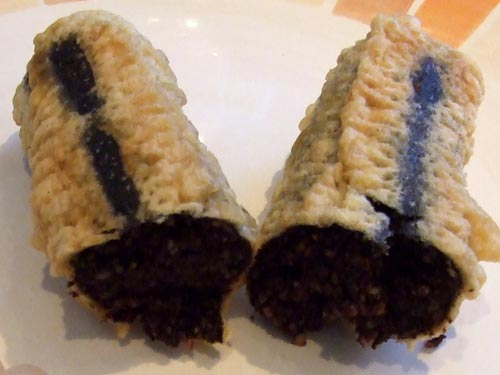
A single battered deep-fried chip shop black pudding (approx. 20 cm long), sliced open

Black pudding is the version of blood sausage native to the British Isles. While the term "blood sausage" in English is understood, it is applied only to foreign usage (e.g., in the story The Name-Day by Saki), or to similar blood-based sausages elsewhere in the world. Black pudding is generally made from pork blood and a relatively high proportion of oatmeal. In the past it was occasionally flavoured with pennyroyal, differing from continental European versions in its relatively limited range of ingredients and reliance on oatmeal and barley instead of onions to absorb the blood. It can be eaten cold, as it is cooked in production, grilled, fried or boiled in its skin. It is often served sliced and fried or grilled as part of a traditional full breakfast, a tradition that followed British and Irish emigrants around the world. Black pudding is now part of the local cuisine of New Zealand and the Canadian provinces of Nova Scotia and Newfoundland and Labrador.

Stornoway black pudding produced on the Isle of Lewis, Scotland, is one of the most renowned varieties and has been granted Protected Geographical Indicator of Origin (PGI) status. Ireland also has two distinctive varieties of black pudding: Sneem Black Pudding from County Kerry, and drisheen, which is distinguished by its gelatinous texture.

The similar white pudding (mealie pudding) is a further important feature of the traditional Northumbrian, Scottish, Irish and Newfoundland breakfast. Black and white pudding, as well as a third variant, red pudding, is served battered in some chip shops in England, Scotland and Ireland as an alternative to fish and chips.

==== Latvia ====
In Latvia, blood sausage is either called asinsdesa (blood sausage) or putraimu desa (groat sausage) because of the added barley groats. It is usually served with lingonberry jam and sour cream.

==== Sweden ====
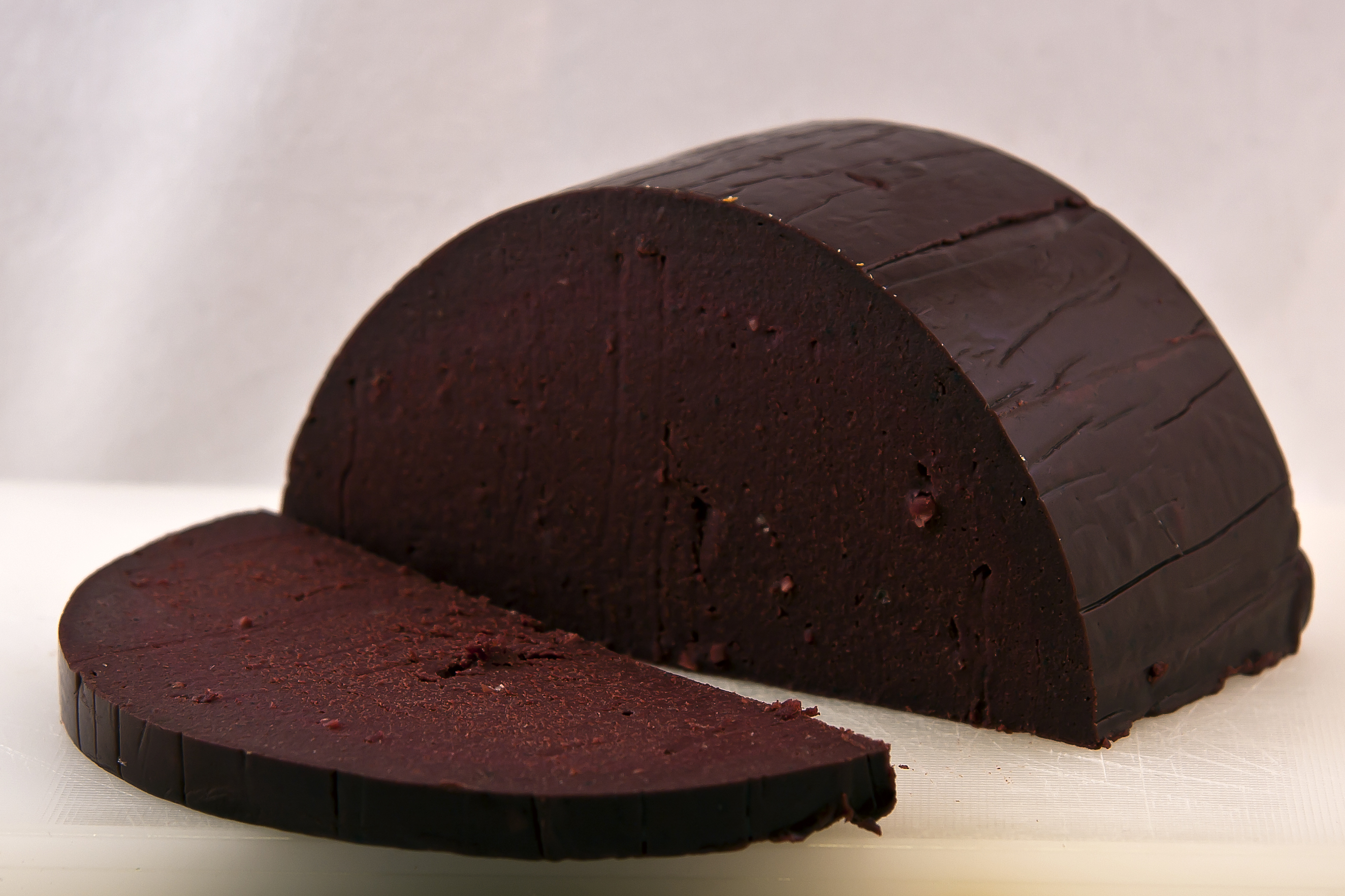
Blodpudding, before being prepared to serve

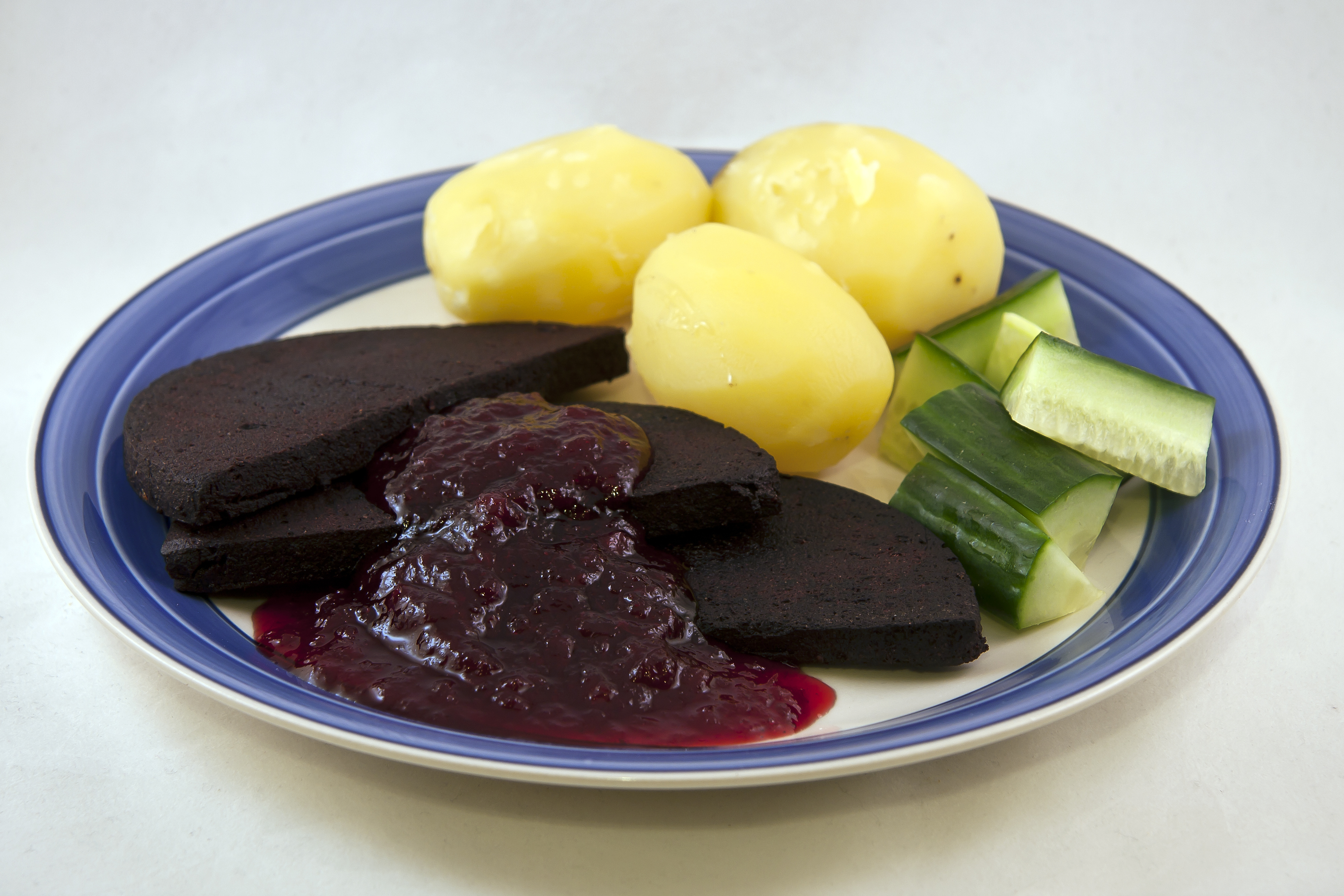
Blodpudding served with boiled potatoes, cucumbers and lingonberry jam

Blodpudding is a traditional dish first documented in the 18th century and still popular in Sweden. The exact proportions and ingredients vary, partly according to regional preference, but generally it is made from pig's blood, milk, rye or barley flour, diced lard, either beer or svagdricka, treacle and onion, flavoured with allspice and marjoram. It is then poured into forms and oven-baked in a waterbath. Most of the blodpudding consumed today is made on industrial basis.

When prepared for serving, it is sliced and fried. The style of serving and accompaniments vary across the country, and it is not uncommon to have the blodpudding act as the meat in a meal. Nationally, the common way is to serve it with lingonberry jam, grated carrots and ice cold milk to drink. Fried bacon or pork side is also common. In Scania, the lingonberry jam is often replaced by finely sliced apples, fried along with the pork.

Other blood-based foods include blodkorv (blood sausage) which differs from blodpudding by having raisins, pork tallow and apple sauce in it, blodplättar (blood pancakes, similar to the original Finnish dish veriohukainen above) and blodpalt. There is also a soup made from blood, called svartsoppa (black soup).

=== Southern Europe ===
==== Croatia, Bosnia, Serbia, Slovenia ====
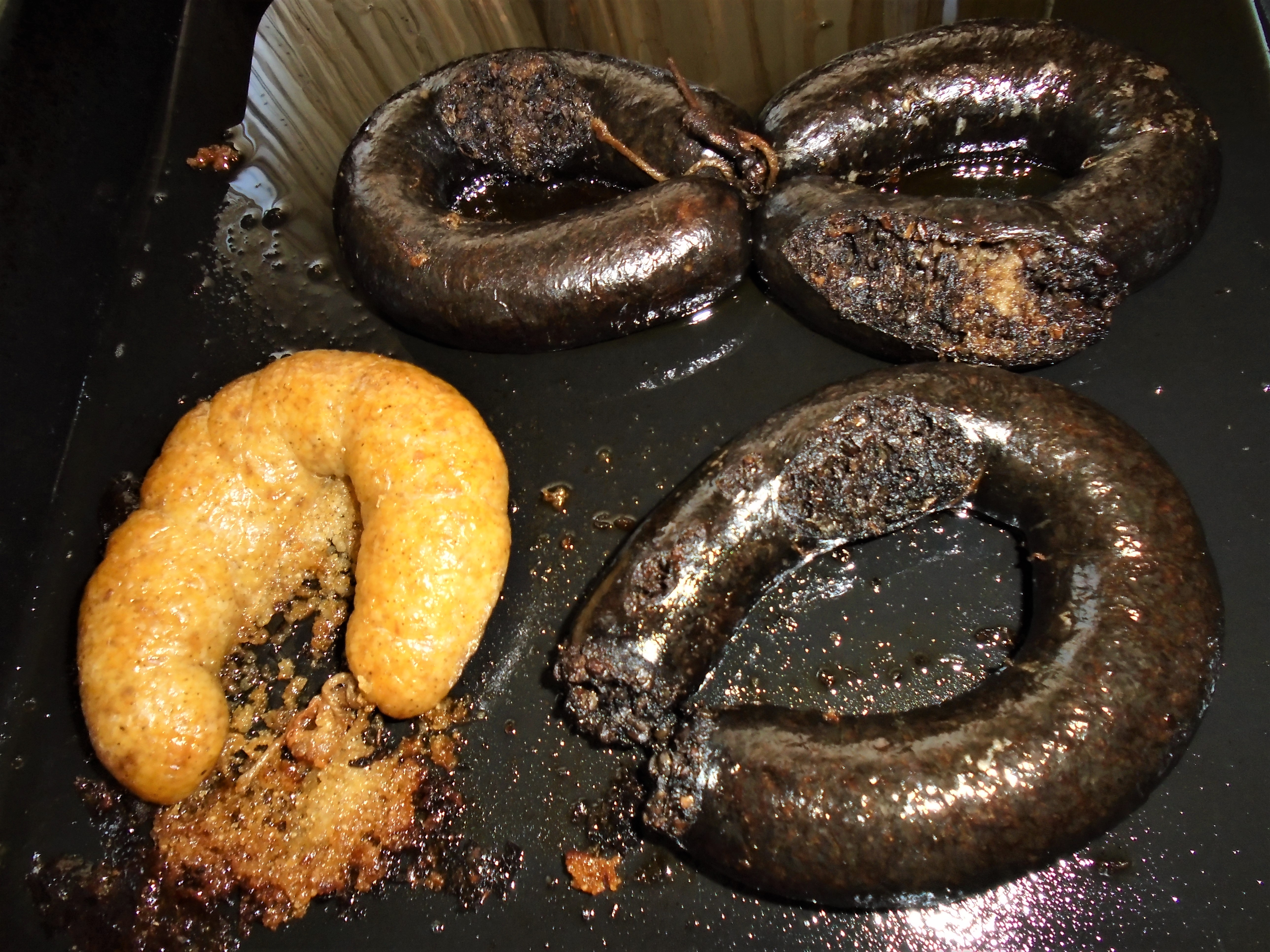
Blood pudding (right) from Croatia baked on a sheet pan

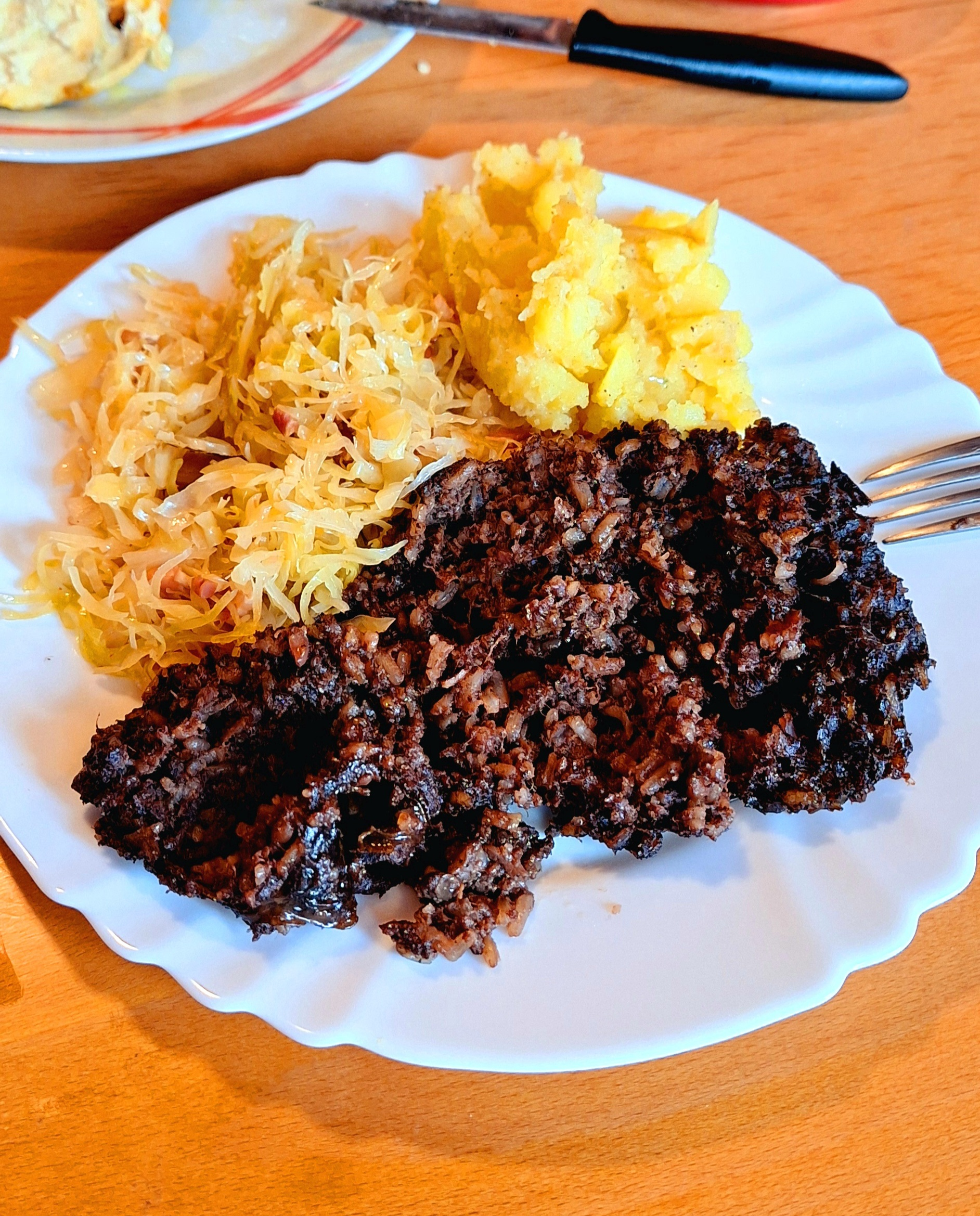
Blood sausage served with sauerkraut and "restani krumpir" in Hrvatsko Zagorje

A similar blood sausage to karvavitsa, called krvavica (крвавица), made out of similar ingredients, is eaten in Bosnia, Croatia, Serbia, and Slovenia in wintertime, usually with sauerkraut and potatoes.

==== Italy ====
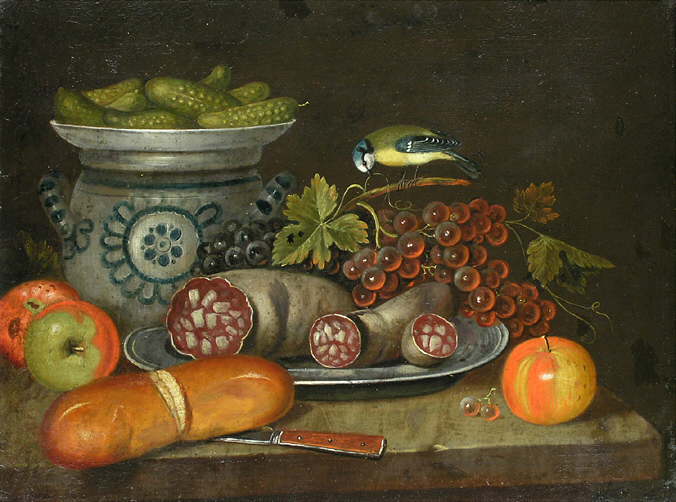
Italian 17th-century still-life showing Blutwurst-like sausages

In Italy, regional varieties of blood sausage are known as sanguinaccio. In Tuscany, buristo is a sausage made with pig's blood and fat cooked in a pig's stomach. It is not reheated and is often spread on bread. It is found only in the south of Tuscany in the winter months and even there it can be difficult to come by. Biroldo is another type of black pudding which can be found in Tuscany, while the version made in southern Lombardy is called marsapan.

Migliaccio is a black pudding that is traditionally prepared in winter in Romagna. It is a sweet pudding with a thick black filling made with pig's blood, sugar, breadcrumbs, almonds, chocolate, butter and spices contained in a thin pastry crust. A similar pudding is made throughout southern Italy, generally called sanguinaccio or sanguinaccio dolce.

==== Portugal ====
In Portuguese cuisine, there are many varieties of blood sausage. Sausages made of blood are usually called morcela (for the larger variety) and negrinha or negrito (from Portuguese negro that means dark or black, for the thinner variety). There are many varieties around the Portuguese-speaking world. In Portugal proper, there are local varieties from different regions of mainland Portugal, including from Guarda, Portalegre, Estremoz and Borba, as well as from the Azores. A variety of morcela made with rice, morcela de arroz (rice blood sausage), is typically associated with Tomar, Leiria, Porto de Mós, Fundão and Belmonte. The morcela is made with a combination of different pork parts, namely blood and pork fat cut into pieces, seasoned with ground pepper, salt, garlic, dried garlic, and spices (including cloves and cumin), as well as wine in the pig's blood. The morcela is a smoked sausage, is black and has a glossy surface, while its dark interior is marbled with fat. There is also a type of black chouriço, also a smoked blood sausage because it is made with pig blood together with pig meat. It is called chouriço de sangue. Places like Melgaço and several other localities in Northern Portugal, as well as in Beiras and Alentejo, are famed for its production. Sweetened blood sausage (chouriço doce) is also made, as in southern Brazil.

==== Spain ====
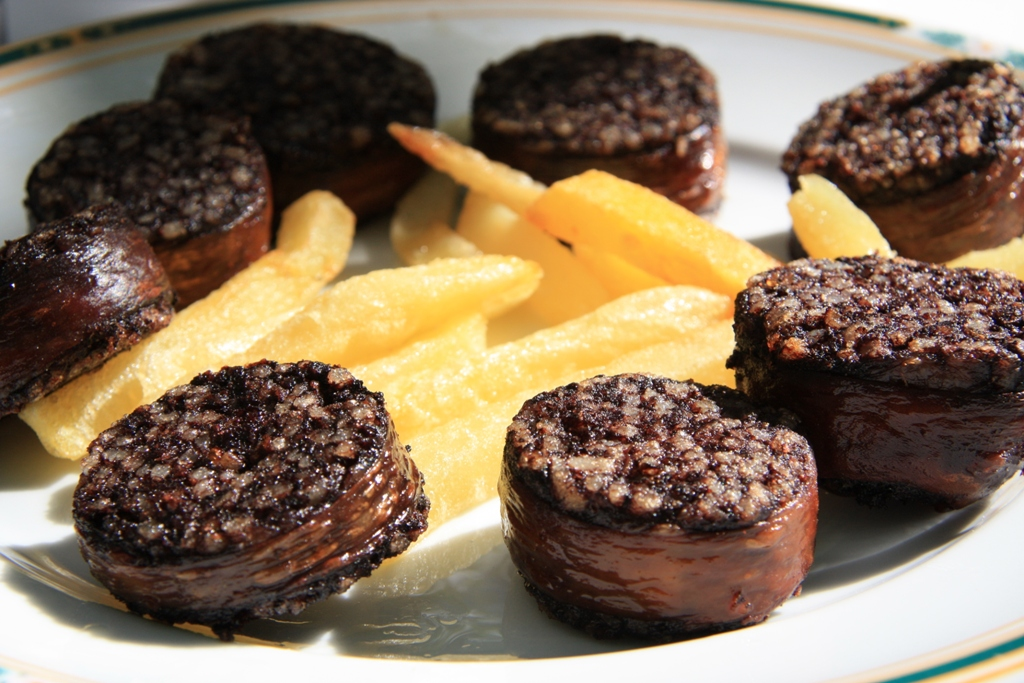
Morcilla de Burgos, a blood sausage made with rice fillers. It is consumed in Spain.

Spanish morcilla has many variants. The most well-known and widespread is morcilla de Burgos which contains mainly pork blood and fat, rice, onions, and salt, and is produced in two varieties: cylindrical and gut-shaped. In Albacete and La Mancha, the morcilla is filled with onions instead of rice, which completely changes the texture. In Extremadura the creamy morcilla patatera includes roughly mashed potatoes. In the northern regions and the Canary Islands there is a sweet variety known as morcilla dulce. Other varieties introduce breadcrumbs, pine nuts, and almonds, and vary the proportions of the other ingredients or flavourings, some of them considered delicacies.

There are other similarly famous kinds being made in Asturias (slightly darker and smaller, used for bean and chickpea stews) and León (without rice, grilled & spread on toasted bread). Other less popular varieties may add cumin to the pudding mixture, but this is not a standard practice. The cooking method for consumption is typically frying, stewing, grilling or roasting, often in served in slices and either as a side dish or on its own. There are many derivative foods made from morcilla, such as omelettes, stuffed red pepper, puff pastry, pizza, flavoured nachos, croquettes, and a range of fillings for different dishes.

In Galicia, blood pancakes are called filloas.

==== Malta ====
The Maltese blood sausage is known as mazzita (plural: mazzit). It was first described in the 1750s in Giovanni Pietro Francesco Agius De Soldanis’s Damma tal-Kliem Kartaginis mscerred fel fomm tal Maltin u Ghaucin, listing words of Carthagenese oriġin spoken widely across mainland Malta and the island of Gozo. The production of blood sausages in Malta was temporarily halted in 2004 when Malta joined the European Union, as no adequate machinery was available in the country to ensure that the blood was handled according to EU standards. However, it was reintroduced on the local market in 2024, when appropriate equipment was procured by the state-run slaughterhouse to gather the blood in appropriate sanitary conditions.

=== Western Europe ===
==== Belgium, Netherlands and Luxembourg ====
In Belgium and the Netherlands, exist 2 varieties one called bloedworst and the other is called beuling.
Bloedworst is a big sausage 4-inch-diameter (100 mm) with white chunks of suet, which is sold in slices of roughly 0.5-inch (13 mm). It is generally pan fried; sometimes apples are cooked alongside or on top of the pieces. It is also eaten with apple sauce, brown sugar, syrup or red cabbage. As a cold cut, thin slices are eaten as a sandwich topping.
Beuling also called Zwarte pens (as opposed to the white variety that is referred to as Witte pens) are individual blood sausages the size of a banana, the filling of which is uniform.
Both are made of blood, from predominantly cows or pigs, sometimes sheep or horse blood are used in specialty products. The blood is mixed with breadcrum, wheat- or potatoflour, or any combination thereof, and fatty parts of the head, belly and organ meat such as lung, tongue, heartmuscle, and spleen.

The Luxembourg träipen includes green cabbage, and is served pan fried with apple sauce. It was eaten in church in the Middle Ages during Carnival and is still consumed for breakfast, baked with apples and topped with apple syrup, during Carnival in the Dutch province of Limburg.

==== France and southern Belgium ====
In France and Wallonia (south Belgium) boudin noir is traditionally prepared in charcuteries, shops that prepare mainly pork products (and sometimes duck and game), but also sell smoked and dried sausages, pâtés, and terrines, along with prepared salads. It is usually called boudin noir and is often made with cream with apples or onions as a filler. It is generally served with either cooked apples, mashed potatoes or both, and is appreciated by combining either the apples or mashed potatoes with each bite of boudin, which has been gently heated and browned in butter. In France also, there are many different regional Boudins Noirs such as the large Boudin du Béarn with pork meat pieces usually eaten cold. The French Confrérie des Chevaliers du Goûte-Boudin (Brotherhood of the Knights of Blood Sausage Tasting) in Mortagne-au-Perche in southern Normandy holds an annual contest of international blood sausage specialities. Boudin is considered the emblematic staple of the French Foreign Legion, and gives its name to the Legion's anthem.

==== Germany and Austria ====
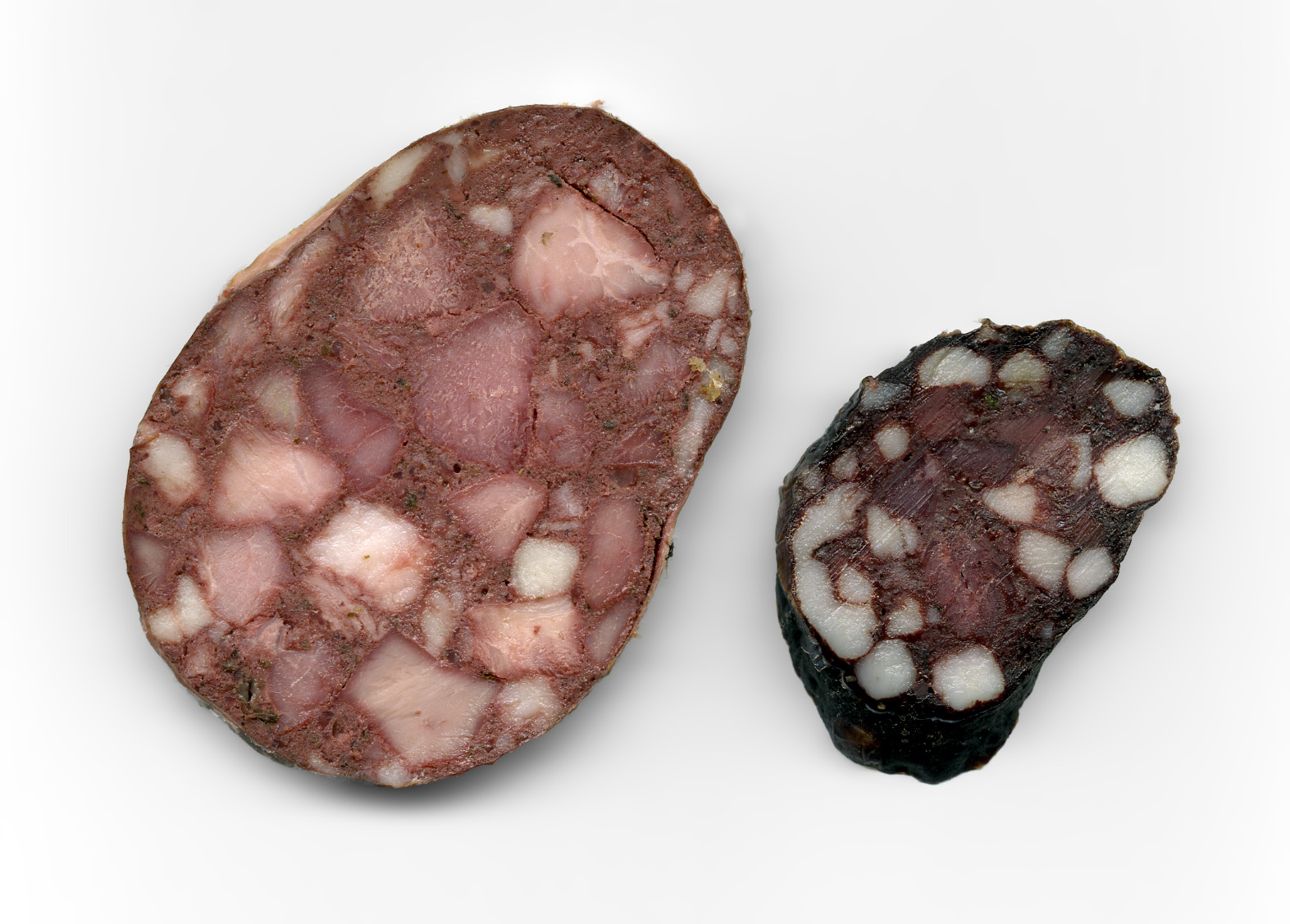
Cross-section of German Blutwurst varieties: smoked with meat (left), dried with bacon (right)

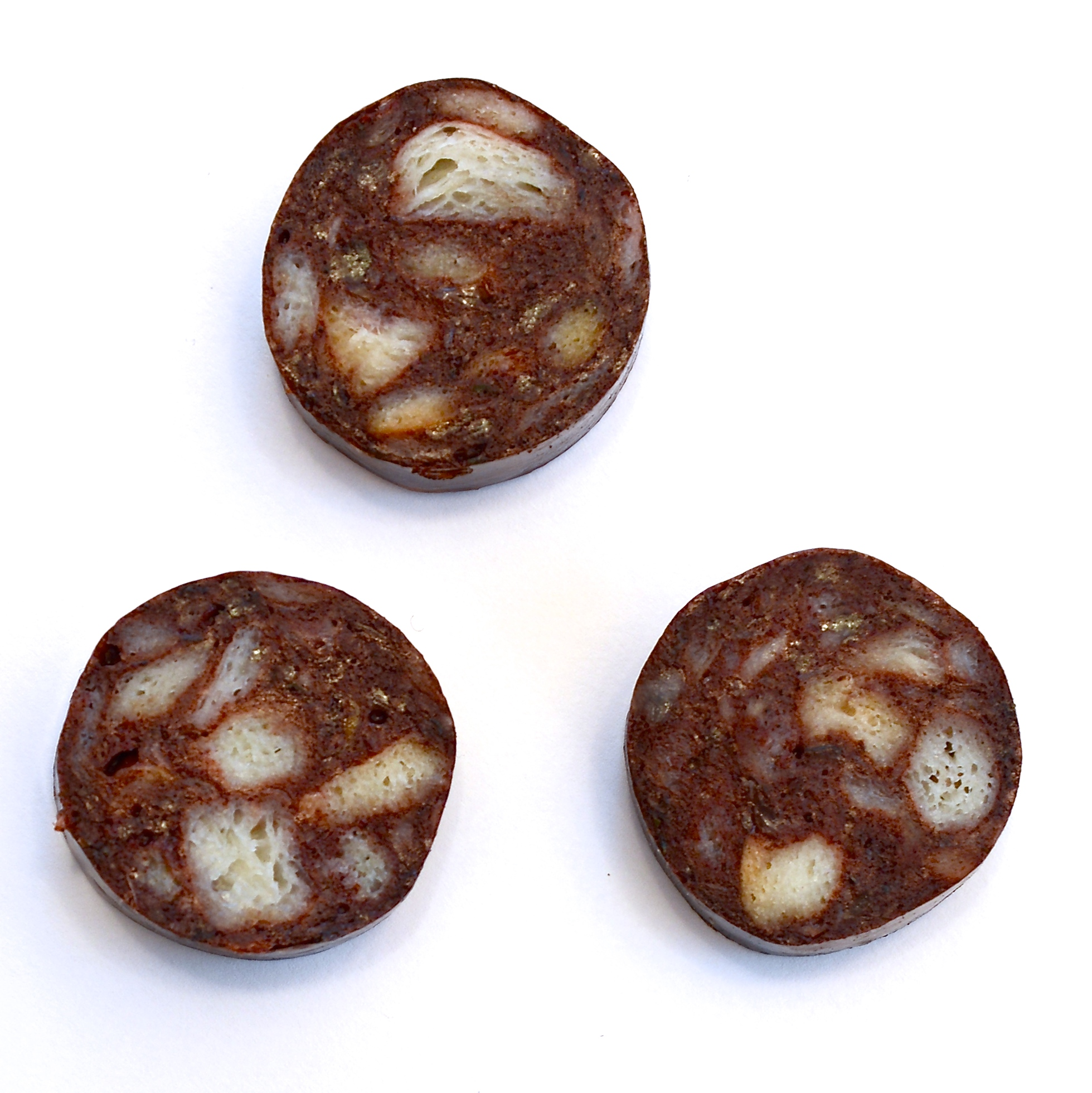
Austrian Blutwurst, called Blunze, with pieces of rolls inside

The most common variant of German Blutwurst is made from pork rind, pork blood and regionally different fillers such as barley. Though already cooked and "ready to eat" it is sometimes served warm, similar to the style in France. In the Rhineland, where it is also traditionally made from horse meat, fried Blutwurst or Flönz is a constituent of various dishes. In particular in Cologne, the traditional Himmel und Erde (Heaven and Earth) combines apple sauce, mashed potatoes and Blutwurst served hot on one plate. In Eastern Germany, hot Blutwurst mixed together with liverwurst and potatoes is called "Tote Oma" ("Dead Grandma").

Other German variants are Zungenwurst, which is Blutwurst mixed with pieces of pickled ox tongue, and Beutelwurst, which is pressed in a linen or paper bag (Beutel). A variety of Blutwurst, the Rotwurst from Thuringia (Thüringer Rotwurst), has geographical indication protection under EU law, with PGI status. Kartoffelwurst (potato sausage) is a post-World War II variety popular in the Palatinate, a reduced fat version of Blutwurst using potato cubes instead of bacon.

In Austria it is often prepared in a dish known as Blunzngröstl, which consists of pan-fried potatoes and blood sausage. This is usually served with freshly grated horseradish.

=== Symbol of Carnival ===
Many Roman Catholics celebrate Mardi Gras, the last day of carnival, (Literally meaning Carne Vale, farewell to Meat in Italian) with rituals involving the blood sausage. For example, in Spain, they celebrate carnival with judías con morcilla (morcilla is a type of blood sausage) followed by the funeral of the sardina.

Likewise, in Belgium and the Netherlands, the Bloodsausage is a symbol for Carnival (most likely following the invasion of Spain during the Eighty Years' War).

François Rabelais in France mentions in his "fourth book" (1552) carnavalesque figures called forest-dwelling Blood-puddings (Saulcis- sons montigènes, Boudins sylvatiques) as a farce representing the Swiss and German Protestants.

=== Additional varieties ===
Other varieties of blood sausage include blodpølse (Norway and Denmark), tongenworst (with added pigs tongues) (Netherlands), krvavica (Balkans), krovianka (Belarus, Russia and Ukraine), and vėdarai (Lithuania).

== Gallery ==
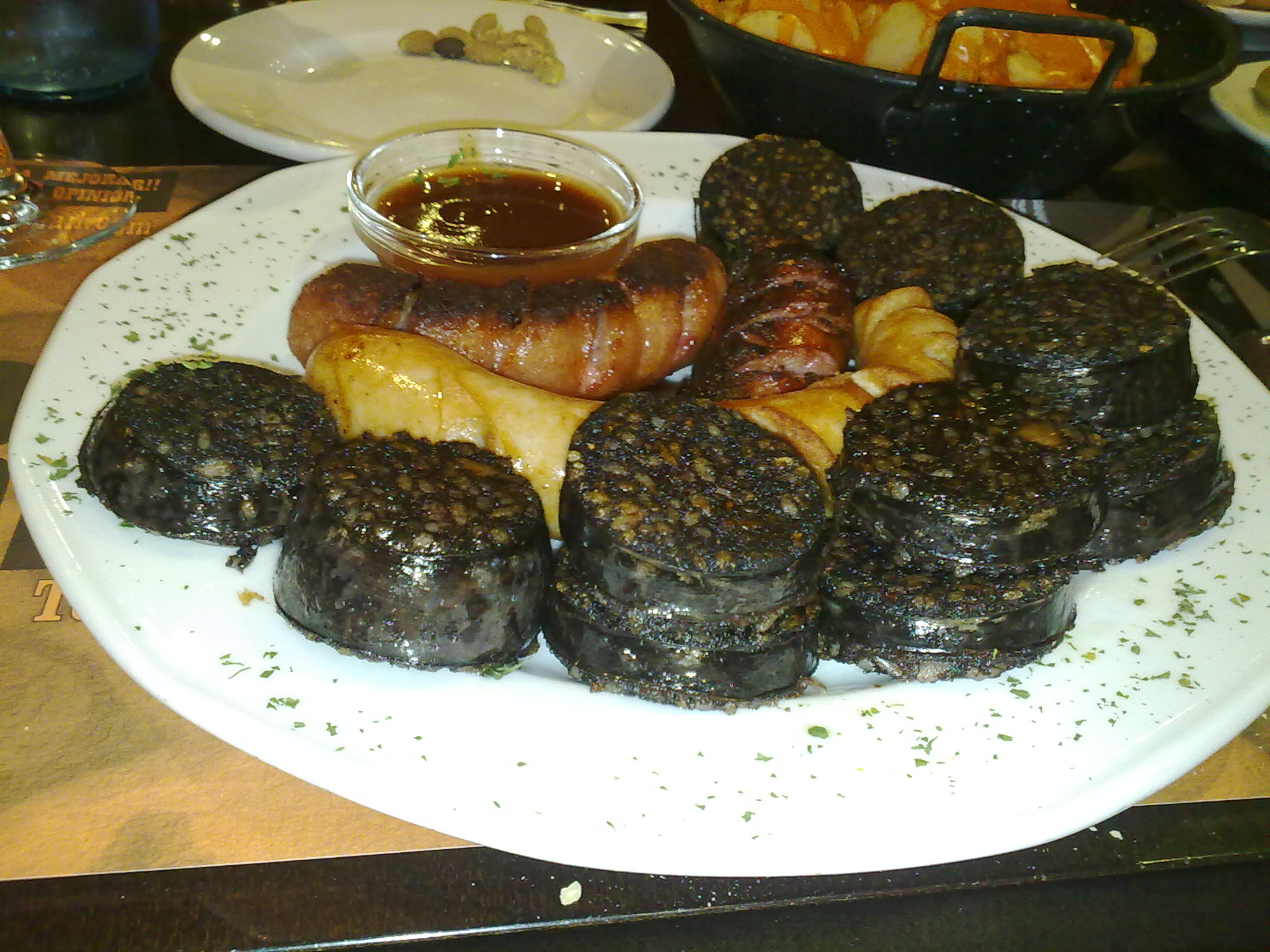
Blood sausage (black sausage) Iberian Peninsula style

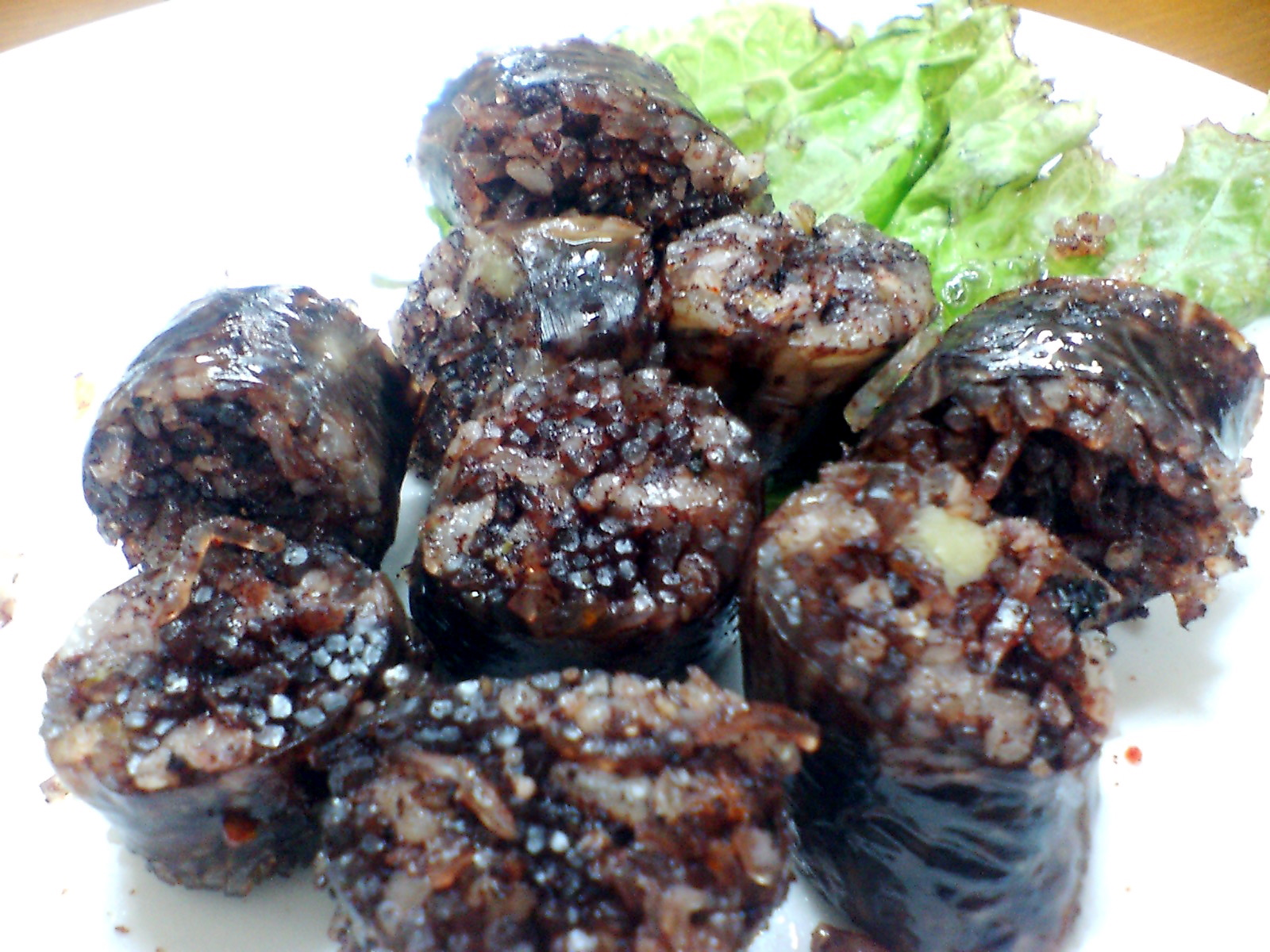
Blood sausage Korean Peninsula style

== See also ==
- Blood soup
- Breakfast roll
- Boerewors
- Commonwealth Black Pudding Throwing Championships
- Drisheen
- Full breakfast
- List of sausages
- Red pudding
- Sliced sausage
- White pudding
