= Pig blood curd =

Type of food

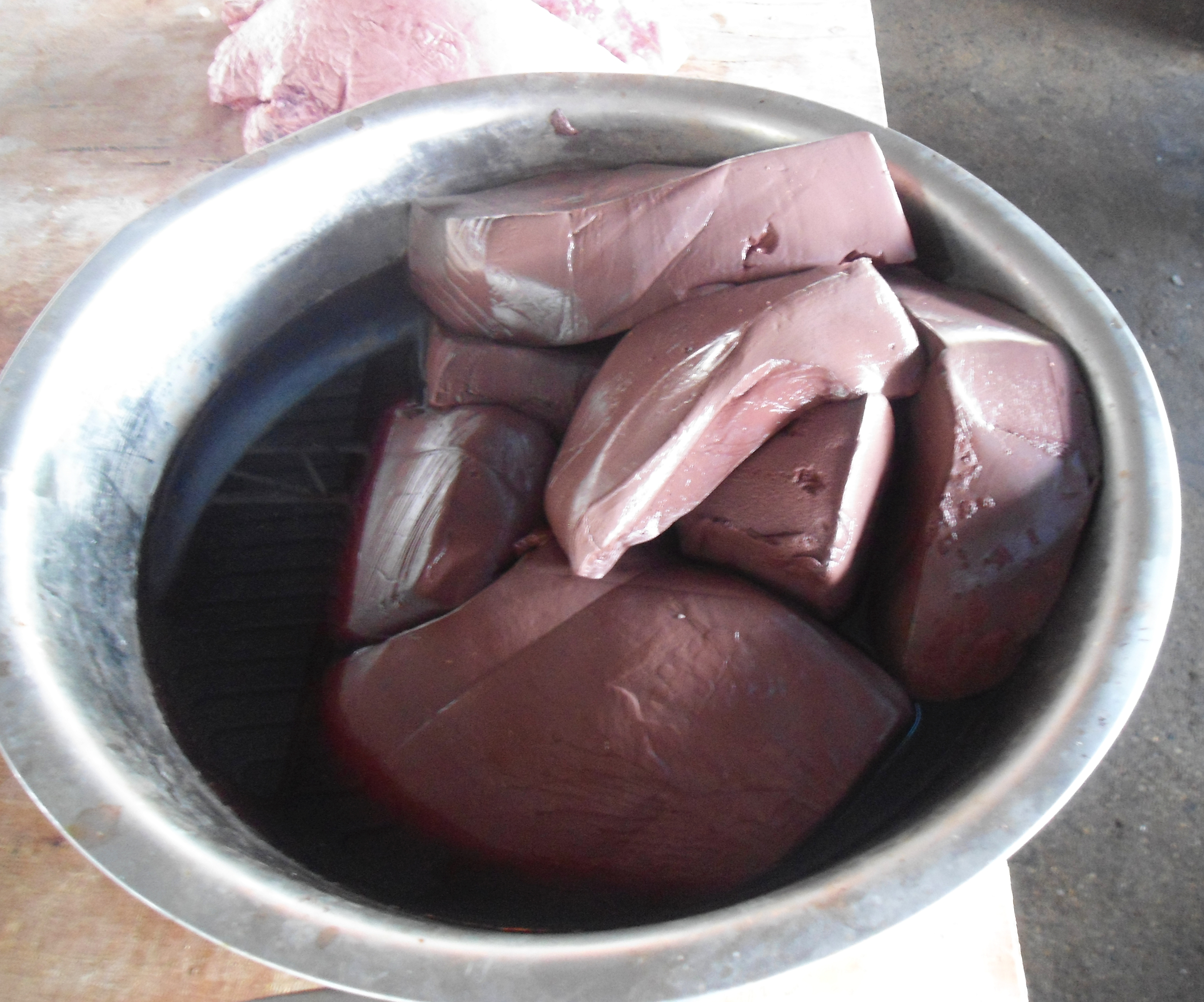
- Type: Blood curd
- Place of origin: China
- Main ingredients: Pig blood

Pig blood curd (Chinese: 豬紅; Jyutping: zyu1hung4; lit. 'pig red'), also known as "blood tofu" or "blood pudding" (Chinese: 血豆腐; pinyin: xuě dòufu; lit. 'blood tofu'), is a popular delicacy originating from China. It is commonly served with carbohydrates, such as noodles or congee.

== Background ==
Pig blood curd originated from blood rice pudding (米血糕) in southern China. Blood rice pudding is a pastry made from blood and rice grains. Rice is the main ingredient of southern Chinese cuisine; the two common methods to cook rice are steaming and boiling. Duck meat is a source of supplement (補劑), however, because of the poor living conditions in the past, poultry was only offered as sacrifices in Chinese festivals. In order to get nutrition from the ducks, farmers saved the blood, steamed it with rice, and served it with sauce. Later, blood rice pudding spread to neighboring towns and villages, and people named it duck blood pudding (鴨血糕). However, because of the rising price of duck, and the inability of chicken blood to coagulate into pudding, pig blood replaced duck blood, resulting in the birth of pig blood curd.

== Preparation ==
Pig blood curd is solid pig blood. Manufacturers coagulate fresh blood by letting it sit in a clean container for around 10 minutes. The blood cube is cut into smaller pieces, then heated in a pot with medium heat with water. During the heating process, salt is added to solidify the blood cubes.

== Characteristics and variations ==
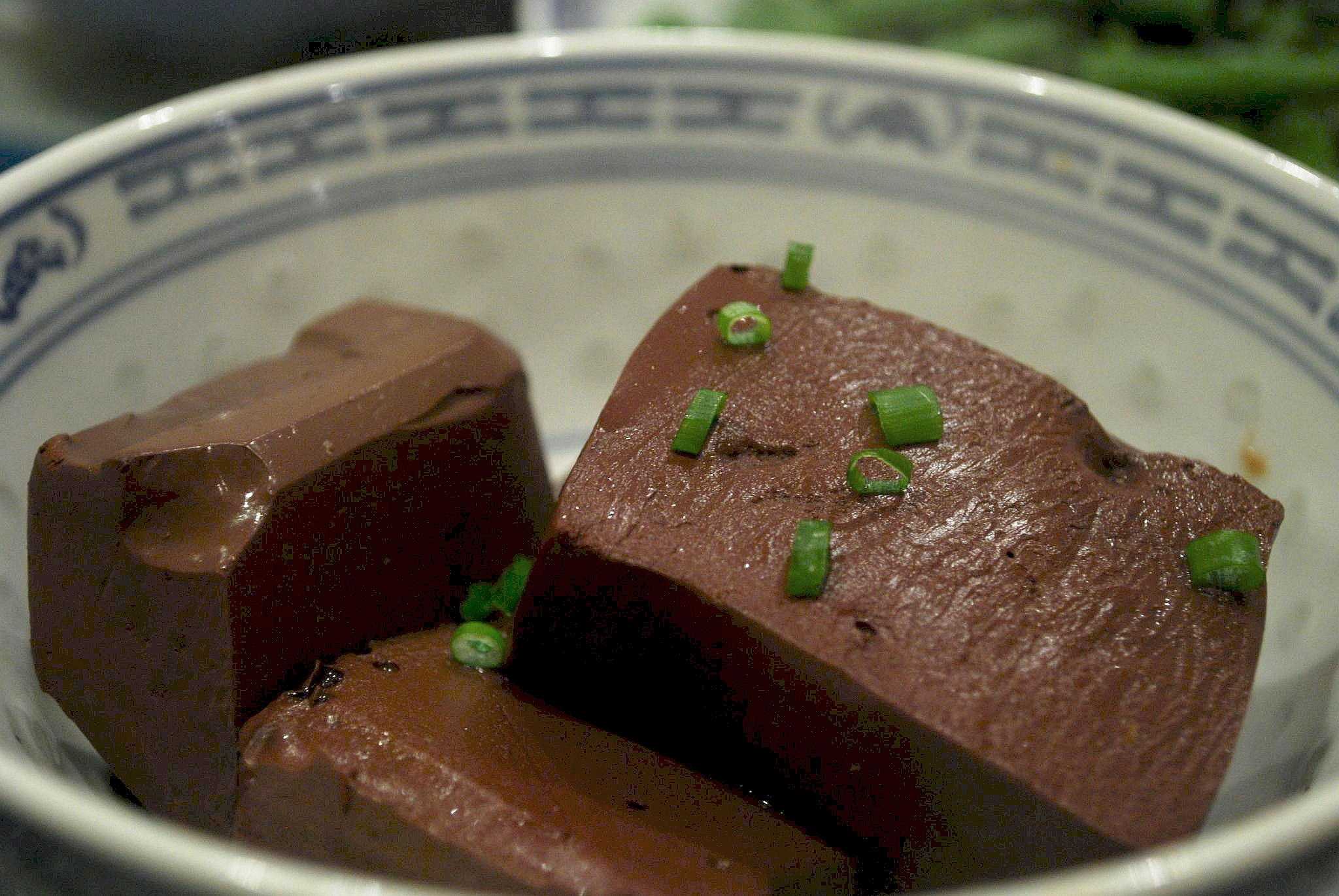

Pig blood curd is soft and smooth, as well as slightly chewy. It can be eaten by itself, or served in boiled soup, hot pot, or even made as a snack on a stick.

Pig's blood can also be made into a variety of dishes: In China, there are recipes like "pig blood curd congee" (豬血粥), which is pig blood curd in congee, and "maoxuewang" (毛血旺), a Sichuan dish served with pig blood curd, part of the cow's stomach, luncheon meat, eel, some form of intestine, and bean sprouts in Sichuan style spicy soup. In Taiwan, pig's blood is made into a street snack called "pig's blood cake" (豬血糕), which is a mixture of pig's blood, fried or steamed sticky rice, and peanut flour served on a stick.

Pig's blood is also made into food by many Western countries. For example, in Britain, black pudding (blood sausage) is made from pig's blood and a high proportion of oatmeal.

== Nutrition ==
Pig blood curd is rich in protein, containing a variety of essential amino acids that closely resemble those found in the human body, making it easy to digest and absorb. This nutrient-dense food also contains beneficial compounds like lecithin and iron, which are important for overall health.

== See also ==
- Blood sausage
- Blood as food
