= Beutelwurst =

German blood sausage

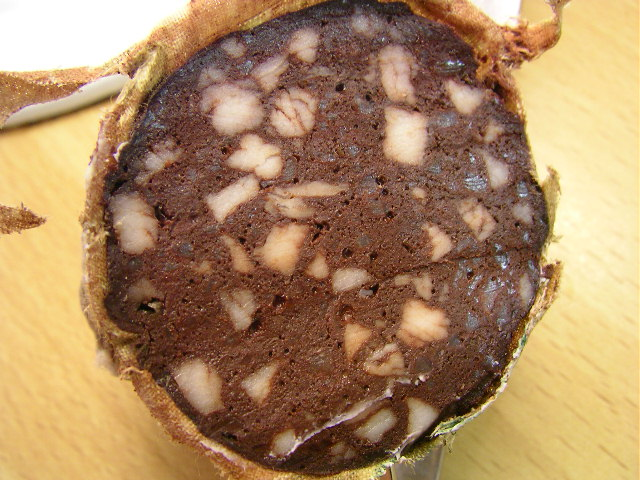
- Beutelwurst with bacon without meat
- Type: blood sausage; German sausage
- Region or state: Germany
- Associated cuisine: German cuisine
- Main ingredients: Blood
- Similar dishes: Black pudding

A Beutelwurst (lit. 'bag sausage') is a German blood sausage, which contains more pieces of fat and flour than a normal Thüringer rotwurst.

The name Beutelwurst comes from the fact that this does not come in a casing of intestine or a can, but in a linen or paper bag ("bag" = Beutel). This bag is pressed for several weeks which gives the Beutelwurst a firm, light, dry consistency.
