= Himmel und Erde =

Traditional Dutch and German dish

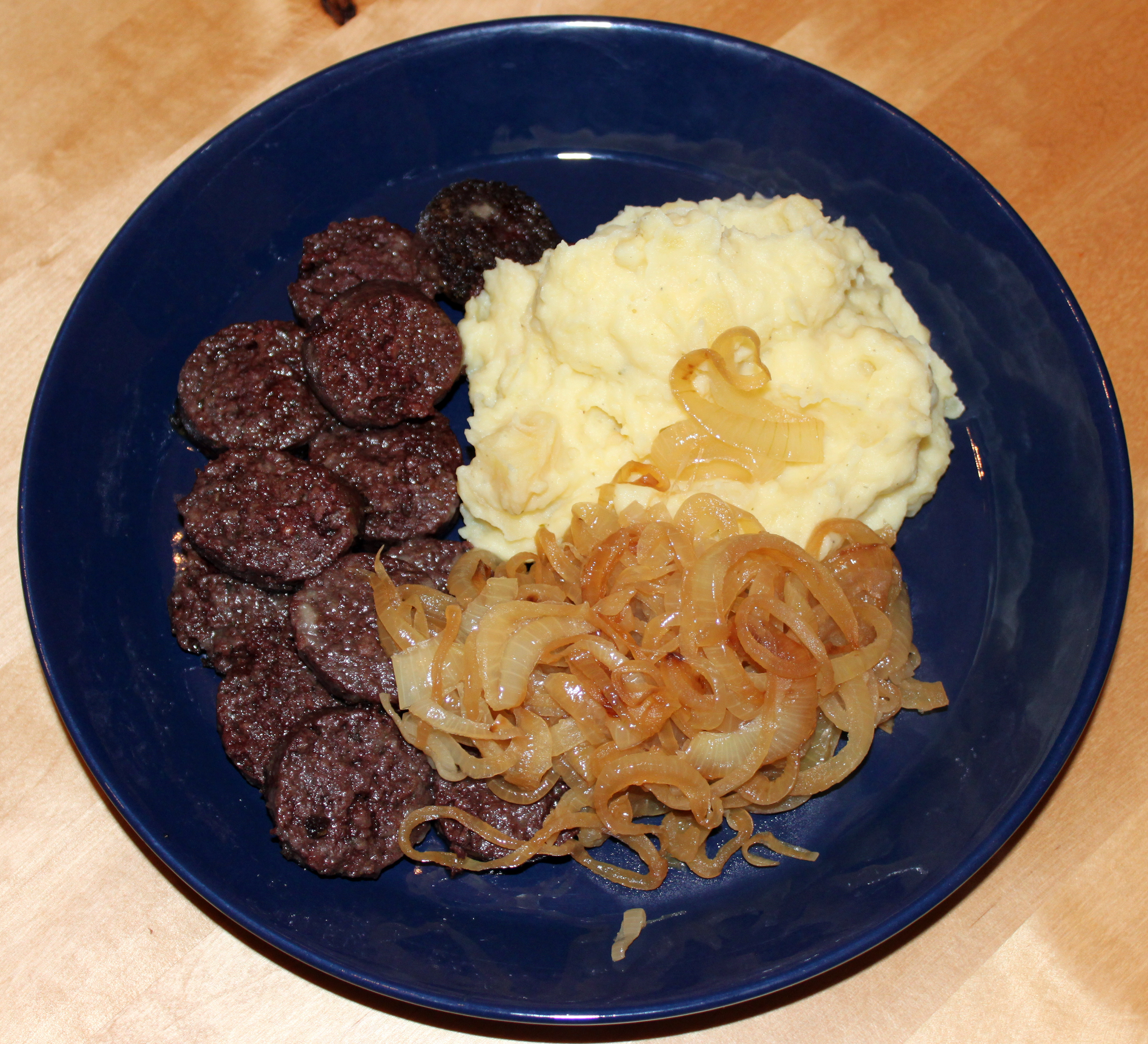
Traditional Himmel und Erde mashed potato and apples, served with blood sausage (Blutwurst) and fried onions

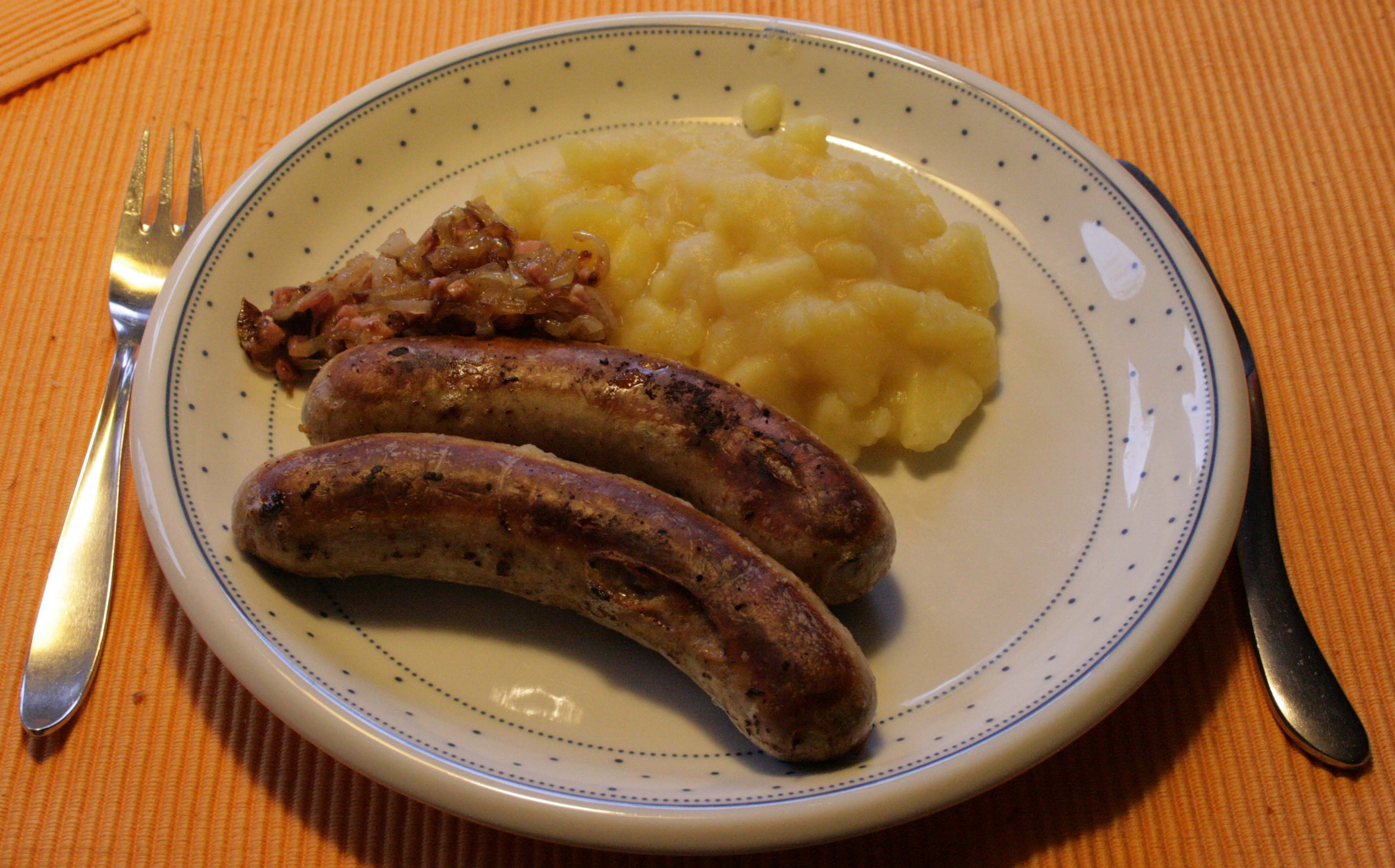
Himmel und Erde with sausage and onions in bacon as served in Westphalia

Himmel und Erde ('Heaven and earth') is a traditional German dish of mashed potato with stewed apples. It is frequently served with sliced blood sausage.

The dish is popular in the Rhineland, Westphalia, Lower Saxony and, historically, in Silesia. It has been known since the 18th century. In the Rhineland the dish is frequently written Himmel un Ääd, to reflect local dialect pronunciation.

== Name ==
The name of the dish alludes to "earth apples" (Erdäpfel, a Southern German name for potatoes) and "sky apples", meaning apples from trees. The German Himmel means both 'sky' and 'heaven'.

== Dutch variant ==
Mashed potato with apples is also popular in the Gelderland and North Brabant regions of the Netherlands, where it is known as hete bliksem ('hot lightning'). The Dutch variant usually mixes the potatoes and apples together as a stamppot and may add stewed pears.
