= Ti-hueh-kué =

Taiwanese blood pudding

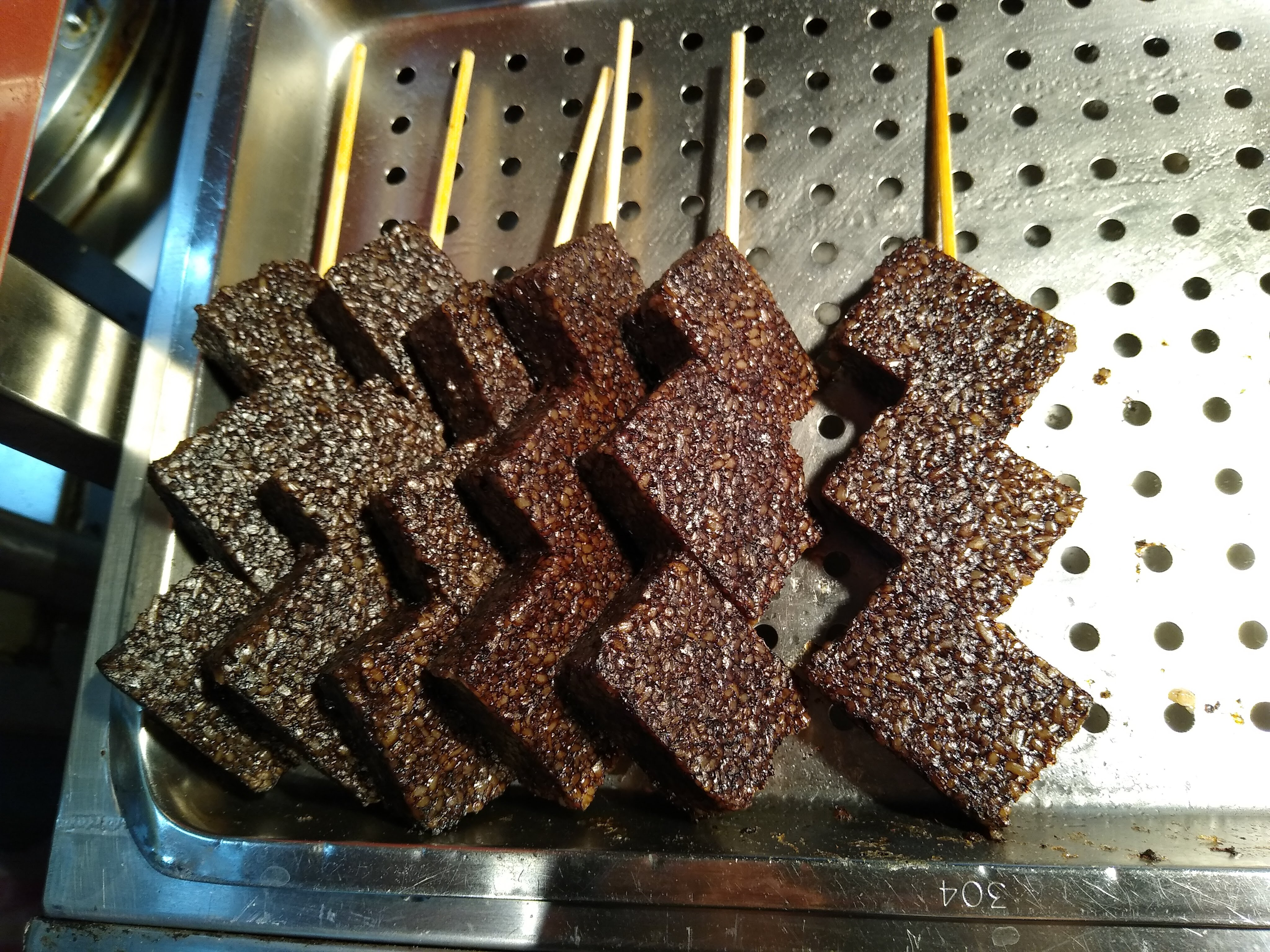
Pig's blood cake as sold in Taipei

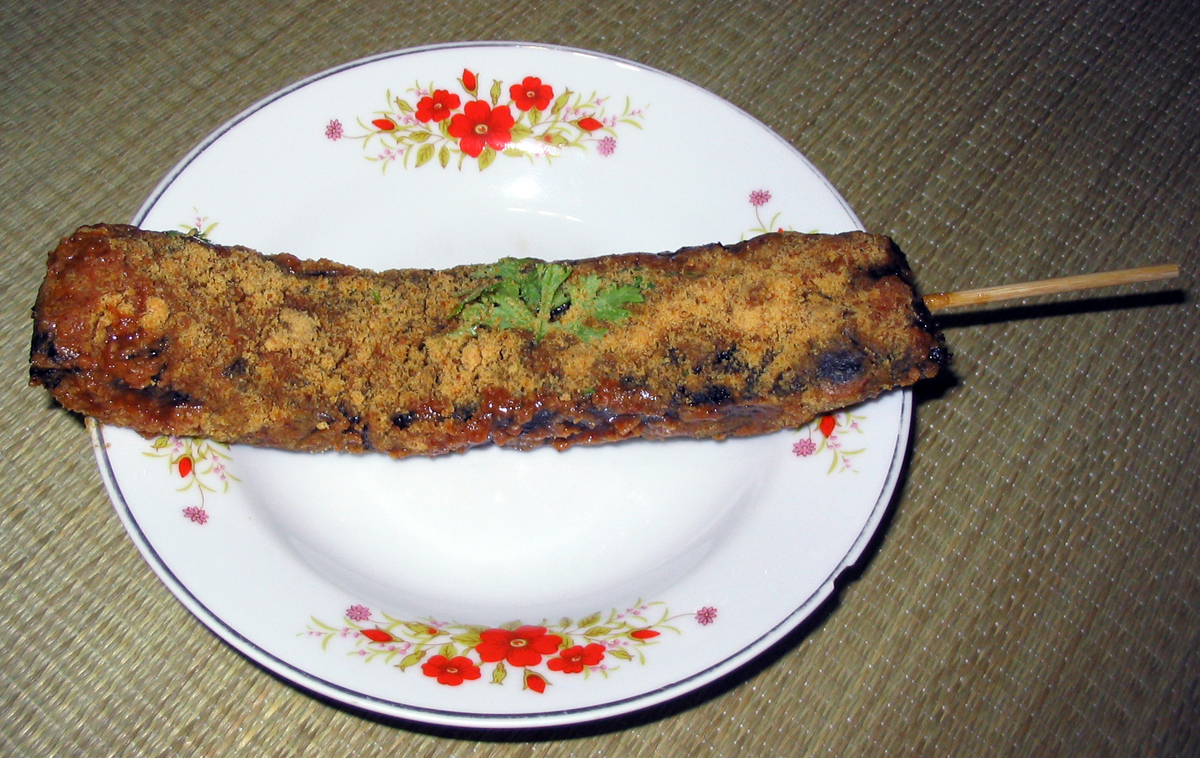
Pig's blood cake coated in peanut powder

Ti-hueh-kué, (Note: Chinese: 豬血粿; Pe̍h-ōe-jī: ti-hoeh-koé; Tâi-lô: ti-hueh-kué; pinyin: zhūxiěguǒ) also known as ti-hueh-ko (Note: Chinese: 豬血糕; Tâi-lô: ti-hueh-ko; pinyin: zhūxiěgāo) or pig's blood cake, is a blood pudding served on a stick as street food in Taiwan. It is made with steamed pork blood, sticky rice and then coated in peanut powder and coriander with dipping sauces. Pig's blood cake originated in Fujian and developed afterwards in Taiwan. It is eaten as a snack. It can also be cooked in a hot pot. It is served hot by street vendors who keep it warmed in a wooden box or metal steamer. A description from Seriouseats described it as cross between a rice cake and mochi.

== See also ==
- Taiwanese cuisine
- Night markets in Taiwan
