= Goetta =

US pork and oats dish

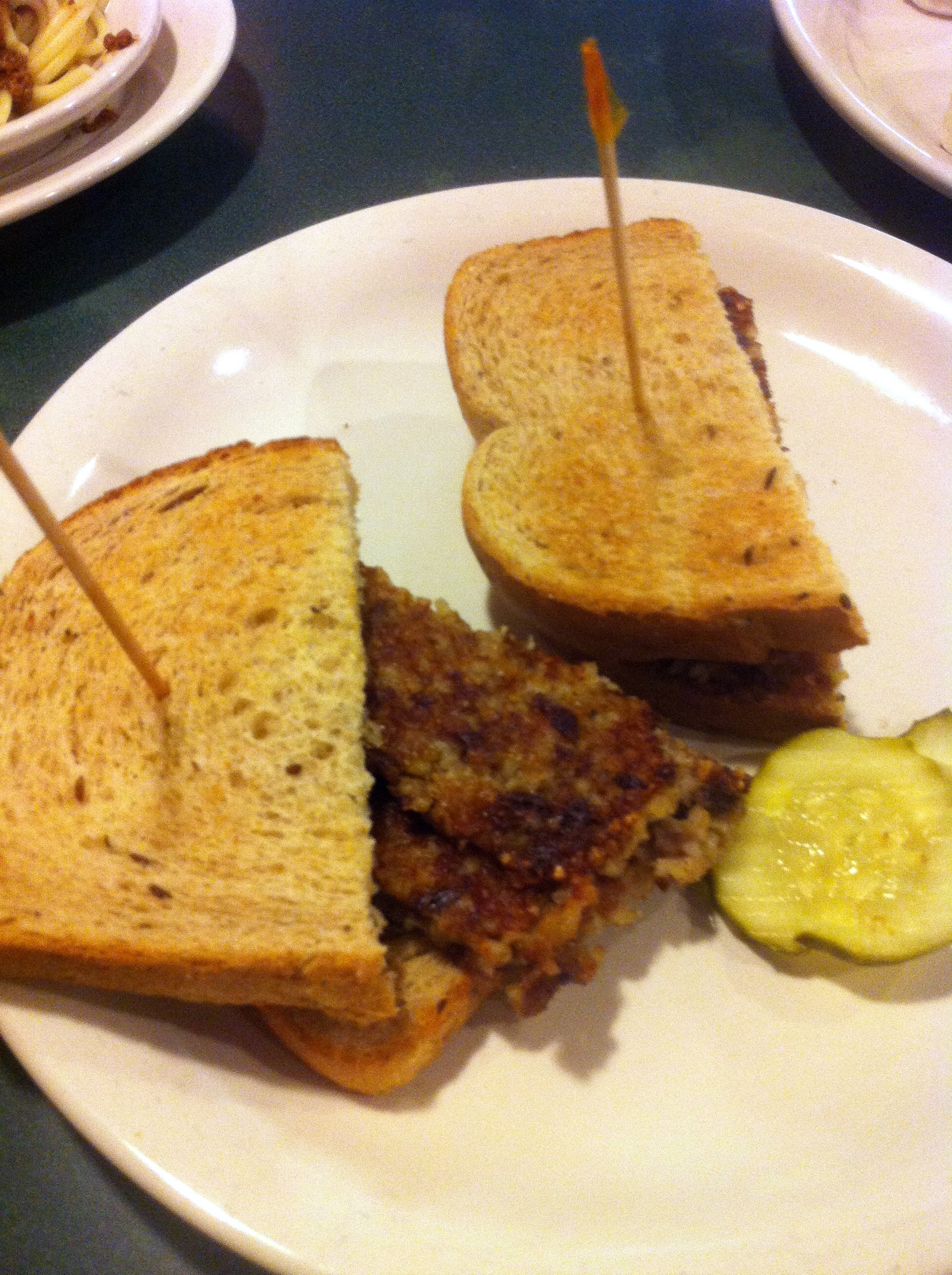
- Goetta sandwich
- Type: Sausage or Mush
- Course: Breakfast
- Place of origin: Cincinnati metropolitan area
- Associated cuisine: American
- Serving temperature: Hot
- Main ingredients: Steel-cut oats; pork or beef
- Ingredients generally used: Onion, spices, herbs
- Food energy (per 56 g serving): 180 kcal (750 kJ)
Nutritional value
(per 56 g serving)
- Protein: 8g g
- Fat: 12g g
- Carbohydrate: 10g g
- Similar dishes: Knipp, scrapple

Goetta (/ˈɡɛtə/ GHET-ə) is a meat-and-grain sausage or mush of German inspiration that is popular in metro Cincinnati. It is primarily composed of ground meat (pork, or sausage and beef), steel-cut oats and spices. It was originally a dish meant to stretch out servings of meat over several meals to conserve money, and is a similar dish to scrapple and livermush, both also developed by German immigrants.

== Origins and popularity ==
The dish probably originated with German settlers from the northwestern regions of Oldenburg, Hannover, and Westphalia who emigrated to the Cincinnati area in the 19th century. The word goetta comes from the Low German word Götte, meaning groats or coarse grains (or a food made from them). In and around Oldenburg, this sausage is called Pinkelwurst (goetta sausage), and available in the winter months in a dish called Gruenkohl mit Pinkel (kale with Goetta sausage). Another similar dish is grutzwurst.

The first commercial producer was Sander Packing.

== Composition ==
A conventional log of goetta

Goetta is usually sold in logs or as slices from a bulk loaf, but links are also available.

While goetta comes in a variety of forms, all goetta is based around ground meat combined with pin-head oats, the "traditional Low German cook's way of stretching a minimum amount of meat to feed a maximum number of people." Usually goetta is made from pork, but occasionally contains equal parts pork and beef. Goetta is typically flavored with some combination of bay leaves, rosemary, black pepper, cloves, and thyme. It contains onions and sometimes other vegetables. The USDA standards for goetta require that it contain no less than 50% meat.

While similar to Pennsylvanian scrapple and North Carolinian livermush in that it is a dish created by German immigrants and uses a grain product for the purpose of stretching out pork to feed more people, scrapple is made with cornmeal and livermush with either cornmeal or rice rather than the pinhead oats used in goetta. In other parts of Ohio where Germans settled there are similar dishes named grits or grutze.

== Preparation and serving ==
Goetta is made with meat, oats, broth, spices, often onions, and occasionally other vegetables, simmered until thick, poured into loaf pans, and chilled or allowed to cool completely so that the loaves become firm enough to slice. It is then cut into slices and fried, often in butter.

Traditionally goetta is served as a breakfast food, but it is also put into sandwiches and used as a topping for burgers and pizza.

== Commercial distribution ==
A number of commercial distributors produce and sell goetta in the parts of Ohio, Kentucky, and Indiana near Cincinnati. Glier's Goetta, established in 1946, produces more than 1,000,000 lb (450 metric tons) annually, around 99 percent of which is consumed locally in Greater Cincinnati. Queen City Sausage is the next largest producer, while multiple small and artisanal producers also make goetta in and around Cincinnati.

== Goettafest ==
"Glier's Goettafest" is an annual culinary festival held in August on the Ohio River waterfront near Newport, Kentucky's Newport on the Levee. The festival celebrates both the dish and Greater Cincinnati's German American heritage. While the main focus of the festival is goetta served in many different ways, it also typically includes music, dancing, and other public entertainment. In 2019 it expanded to two consecutive weekends. The first festival was held in 2002.

== Misconception ==
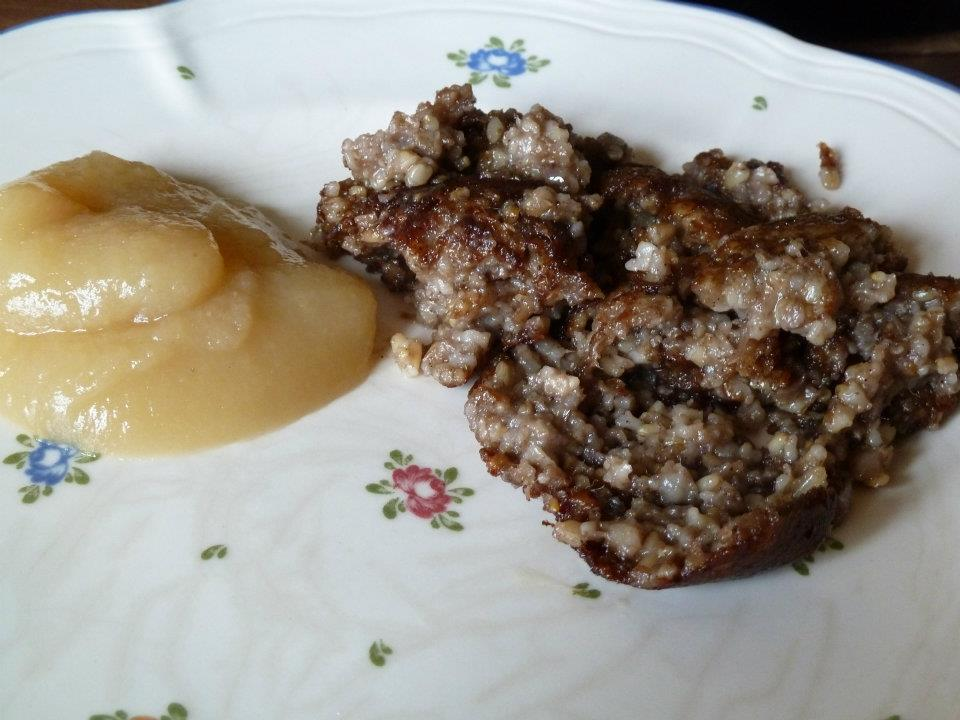
A plate of pan-fried Knipp with apple sauce

Glier's markets goetta as the "German Breakfast Sausage," which may create the impression that it is something commonly eaten for breakfast in Germany. Cincinnati food expert Dann Woellert says, "Will you find something on a menu called goetta in a Westphalian gasthaus? The answer is no," but that grützwurst and knipp are similar "meat gruels".

== See also ==
- List of regional dishes of the United States

=== Similar dishes ===
- Balkenbrij
- Black pudding
- Blutwurst
- Boudin
- Groaty pudding
- Grützwurst
- Haggis
- Jaternice
- Kaszanka
- Kishka
- Knipp
- Livermush
- Lorne sausage
- Pölsa
- Red pudding
- Scrapple
- Slátur
- Stippgrütze
- Weckewerk
- Westfälische Rinderwurst
- White pudding
