= Lower Saxon cuisine =

Culinary traditions of Lower Saxony, Germany

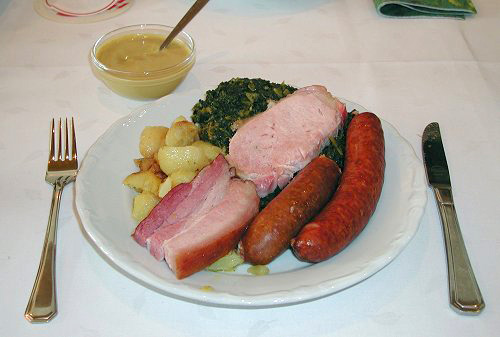
Grünkohl dish with Pinkel, Kassler and Speck

Lower Saxon cuisine (German: Niedersächsische Küche) covers a range of regional, North German culinary traditions from the region correspondingly broadly to the state of Lower Saxony, which in many cases are very similar to one another, for example cuisine from the areas of Oldenburg, Brunswick, or East Frisia.

It is mainly indigenous and in some cases very hearty, with many cultural dishes including poultry, venison, turkey, and vegetables. Many other recipes also include potatoes, asparagus and North Sea fish, all of which are harvested in the region.

== Vegetables and accompaniments ==
The most common accompaniment is potato, which is prepared in a variety of ways, especially as Salzkartoffel or boiled potatoes.

A popular vegetable, very typical of the area, is kale or Grünkohl, known regionally, especially in Bremen and Brunswick Land as Braunkohl.

Asparagus (Spargel) is eaten as a great delicacy in the state of Lower Saxony. It is grown mainly around the towns and cities of Burgdorf, Nienburg, Brunswick and in the Oldenburg Münsterland as well as the southern part of the Lüneburg Heath and on the Stade Geest.

== Fish dishes ==
Plaice, flounder, herring and mackerel are typical fish dishes served in the coastal region and the areas around the estuaries of major rivers like the Elbe, Weser, Jade and Ems. In the interior of Lower Saxony, trout or eel, e.g. at the Steinhuder Meer, are popular dishes. As in much of Northern Germany, Fischbrötchen (fish sandwiches) are a popular dish. Atlantic cod and coalfish are also very common fish that are used in Lower Saxon's cuisine.

== Meat dishes ==
Pre-cooked sausage (Kochwurst) is very popular in the Lüneburg Heath and the region around Bremen as well as the Schaumburg Land; local varieties include Bregenwurst, Kohlwurst, Pinkelwurst. Other meat dishes from that area include Knipp, venison and game. Two specialities from the Hanover region are the Schlachteplatte, a dish with a variety of different meats, and the Calenberger Pfannenschlag (also known as Rinderwurst). An internationally known sausage speciality is the Braunschweiger. In addition in the region of Gifhorn and Wolfsburg Pottwurst with Sauerkraut is a popular autumn fare.

== Soups and stews ==
Soup is often eaten as a starter. Particularly popular is Hochzeitssuppe, a meat broth. On the North Sea coast there is a plant called arrowgrass (Triglochin maritimum) known as Stranddreizack or Röhrkohl . This grows in the salt meadows immediately next to the coast and is prepared, like Grünkohl, as a thick stew. Other country dishes along the coastal region are Steckrübeneintopf and Birnen, Bohnen und Speck, both types of stew.

== Puddings and cakes ==
For coffee breaks butter cakes (Butterkuchen), tortes or other desserts are eaten, such as Welf pudding. Buckwheat gateau is popular around the Lüneburg Heath region.

== Drinks ==
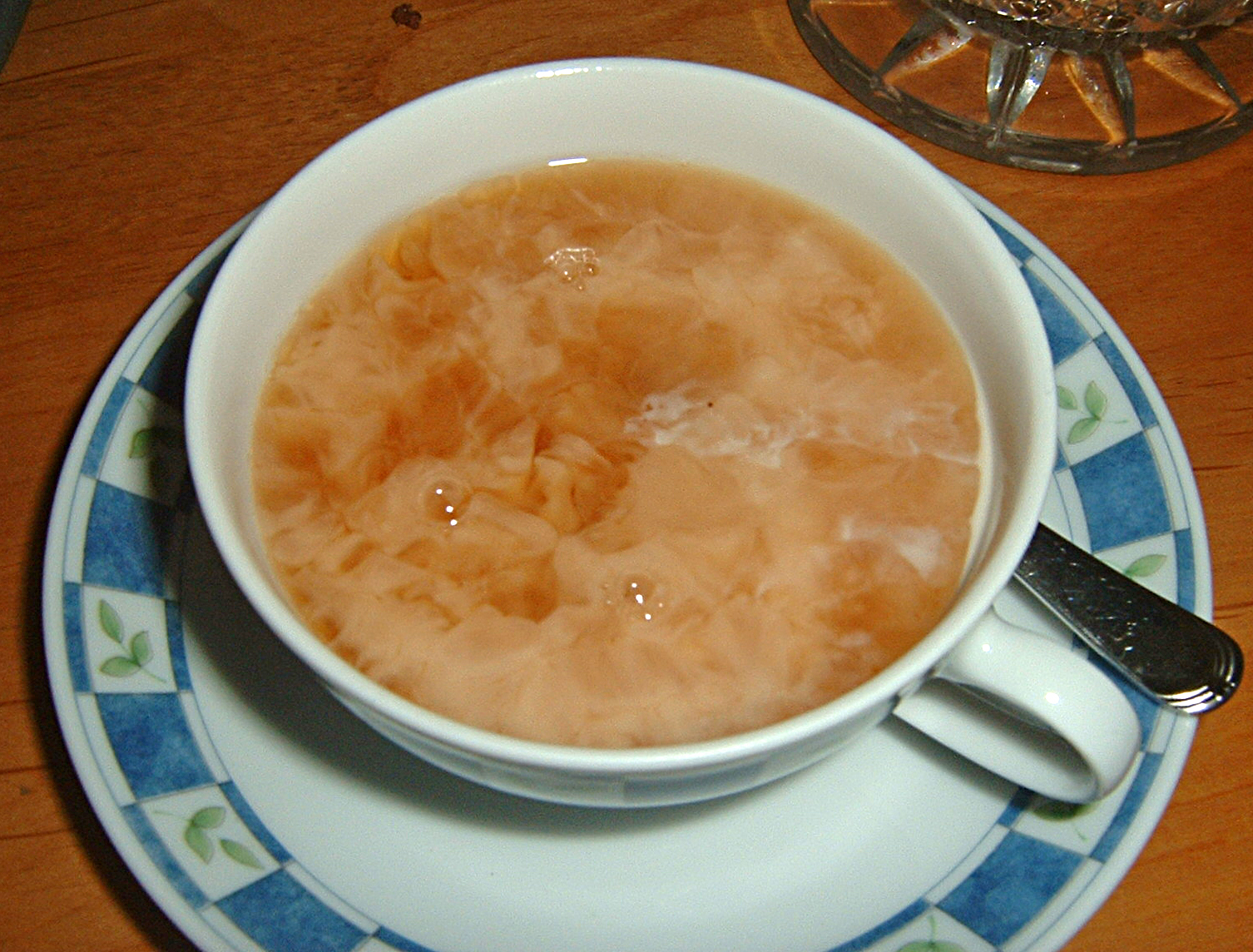
East Frisian tea

Lower Saxony is home to many breweries, for example in Jever, Einbeck, Celle, Lüneburg, Brunswick, Allersheim (part of Holzminden), Hanover, Wittingen, Peine and Göttingen.

Two of the oldest beers, which have been brewed since the Middle Ages, are Brunswick Mum (Braunschweiger Mumme) and Goslarer Gose.

While most Lower Saxons prefer coffee, there is a strong tea culture in East Frisia and Friesland, with some of the highest tea consumption rates in the world. Ostfriesland, as the region is known in German, consumes about 25% of all the tea consumed in Germany. Beyond consumption, tea is essential to the identity of the region. For example, there is a tea museum in Norden and there are annual tea festivals. Tea in the region is typically drunk with Kluntjes (rock candy) and heavy cream which is not stirred.

Many regional herbal liqueurs are produced in Lower Saxony, such as Heidegeist and Ratzeputz on the Lüneburg Heath and Schierker Feuerstein and Harzer Grubenlicht in the Harz, as well as world-renowned Jägermeister.

== See also ==
- Harzer, a cheese made in Harz
