= Jones Dairy Farm =

American Food Company

Coordinates: 42°55′17.3″N 88°50′41.7″W

- Type: Private
- Industry: Food
- Founded: 1889
- Headquarters: Fort Atkinson, Wisconsin, U.S.
- Key people: Milo Jones
- Products: breakfast sausage, bacon, ham, scrapple, liver sausage
- Website: jonesdairyfarm.com/

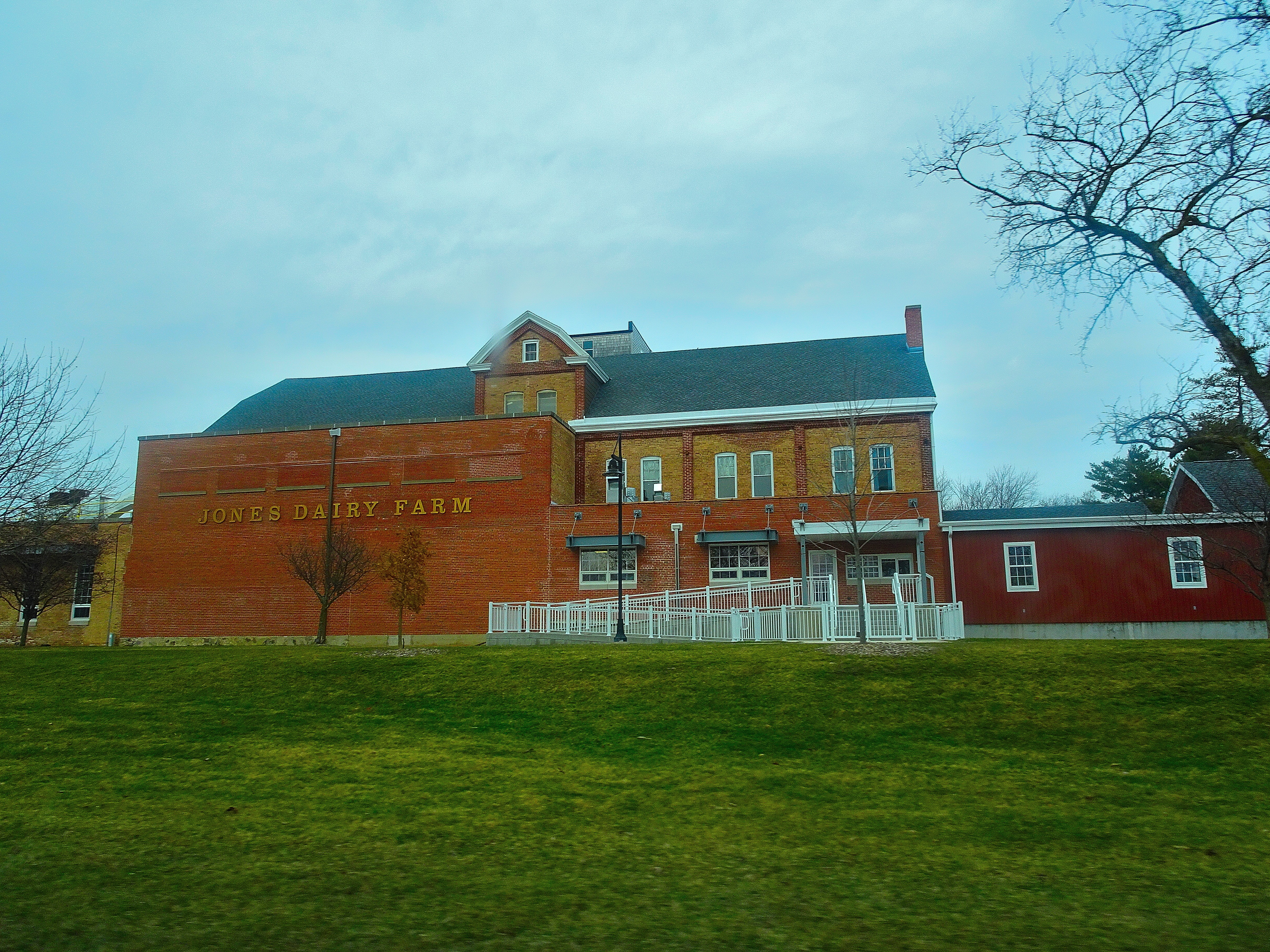
Building in Fort Atkinson

Jones Dairy Farm is an American, privately owned food company that produces a series of meat products, including breakfast sausage, ham, Canadian bacon, breakfast bacon, scrapple, and liver sausage. The company was established in 1889. The Jones family has owned and operated the business since its establishment by Milo C. Jones.

== History ==
In 1832, Milo Jones, a government surveyor, moved from Vermont to Fort Atkinson, Wisconsin, with his wife and two children, to establish a traditional dairy farm. This small family farm produced primarily cheese, but they also raised pigs for their own consumption. In 1849 Milo C. Jones was born and soon joined his family in working the farm. At the age of 35 the younger Jones developed rheumatoid arthritis and was unable to continue working on the farm; however in 1889, with the family facing financial difficulty, he decided to begin a sausage-making enterprise in the family's cheese room using his mother's traditional family recipe that had been brought from Vermont. Milo Jr.'s sausage production technique was unique at the time: instead of pork trimmings, he made his sausage using ham, loin, and shoulder cuts.

Milo Jr. began selling his sausage to Wisconsin grocers, neighbors and friends, but quickly expanded into large markets, such as Chicago, New York City and Boston, and began delivering product by rail. Unlike most sausage makers of the day, Milo advertised heavily. This advertising originated with direct mail, and expanded to national magazines like Saturday Evening Post, Literary Digest and Good Housekeeping as early as 1903.

Jones Dairy Farm established a number of industry firsts. In the 1920s Jones was the first meatpacking company to quick-freeze sausage, which allowed shipping throughout the United States and abroad without the need for chemical preservatives. The company was also the first to introduce a line of fully cooked breakfast sausage and one of the first to offer a “light” breakfast sausage product. Jones also became one of the first meatpacking companies to operate a modern bacteriological laboratory on-site to monitor and test food safety. The company is one of a handful of companies (and the only privately owned company) that meets the standards of the American Association for Laboratory Accreditation, a nonprofit public service dedicated to the formal recognition of testing laboratories, inspection bodies and proficiency testing.

After Milo C. Jones Jr.'s death in 1919, he was succeeded as president by his daughter, Mary. She was followed by her nephew, Alan Jones, in 1960 and then by his brother Edward Jones in the 1970s. Alan's son, Milo C. Jones III, became president in 1983. Edward C. Jones, Jr. (son of Edward) became the seventh president in 1995 and his son Philip Jones, the great-great grandson of company founder Milo C., became president and CEO in 2001.

== Location ==
Jones Dairy Farm is set on 300 acres (120 ha) and encompasses the factory, crop fields, and the original farmhouse where Milo Jones I settled in 1843.

On December 27, 1978, the property, except for the modern plant, was listed on the National Register of Historic Places. This includes the old post and beam barn built around 1839, a greenhouse built in the 1840s, and the horse barn built in the mid-19th century. Also included is the farmhouse begun in the 1840s and expanded in the 1860s, 1910, and 1922, the sausage kitchen added in 1907 (designed by D.I. Davis and Associates of Chicago), a Colonial Revival house built by one of the Jones sons in 1897, and another built in 1930.

== Products ==
In addition to the original breakfast sausage recipe, which has remained unchanged since 1889, Jones also produces hams, bacon, Canadian bacon, liver sausage and scrapple for both retail and foodservice customers. These are sold both in traditional supermarkets and grocery stores, as well as by special order from the company's website. Jones Dairy Farm owns scrapple producers Habbersett and Rapa.

== Sponsorships ==
Jones offers a number of products certified gluten-free by the Gluten-Free Certification Organization, a program of the Gluten Intolerance Group, of whom they are a sponsor. Jones also promotes awareness of celiac disease by sponsoring the Celiac Disease Foundation and is a benefactor member of the Celiac Sprue Association.

In 2015, Jones sponsored an annual scholarship for culinary students at Pennsylvania College of Technology.
