= Knipp =

German meat-and-grain sausage

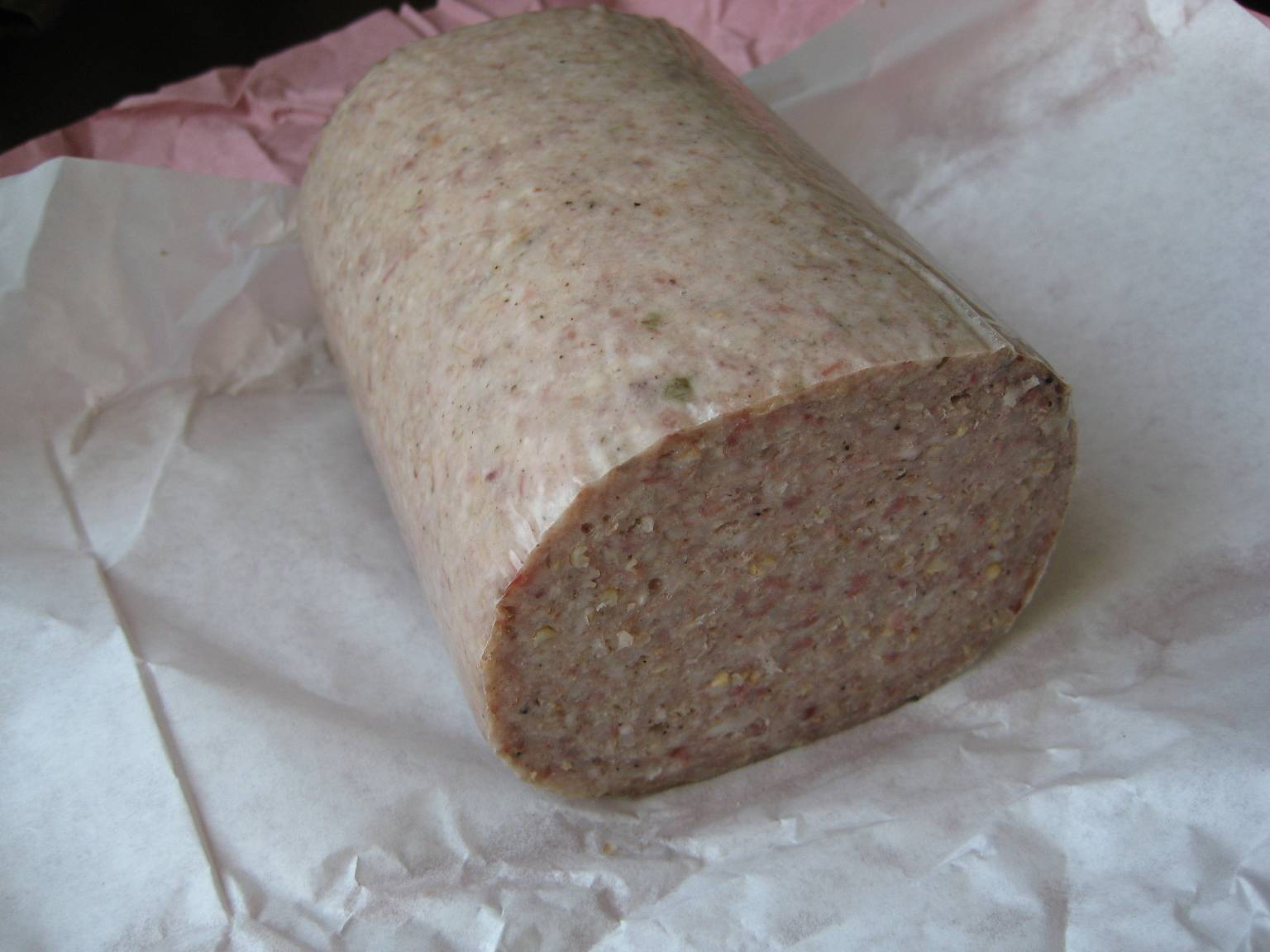
Knipp, raw

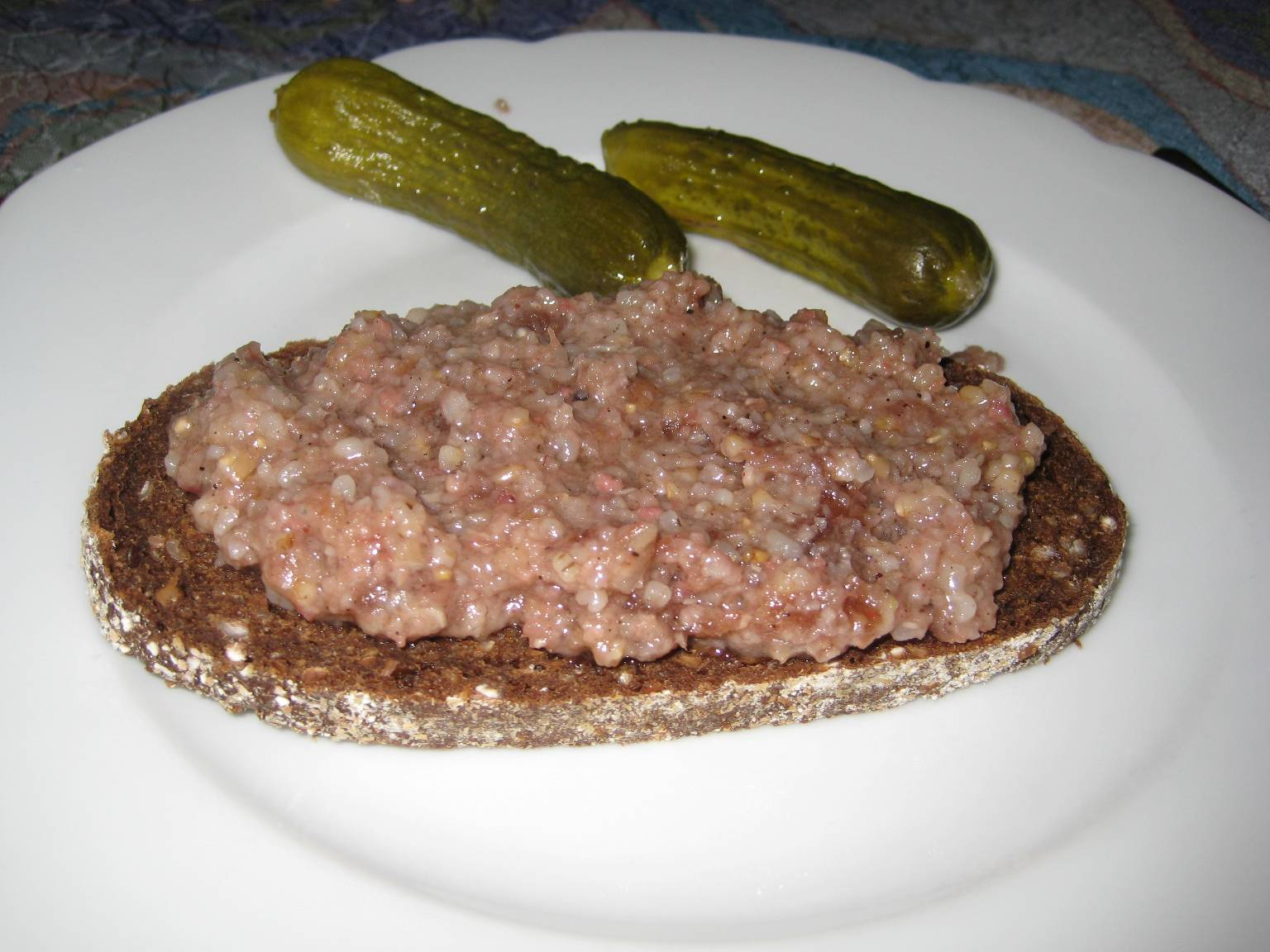
Knipp, warm on wholemeal bread

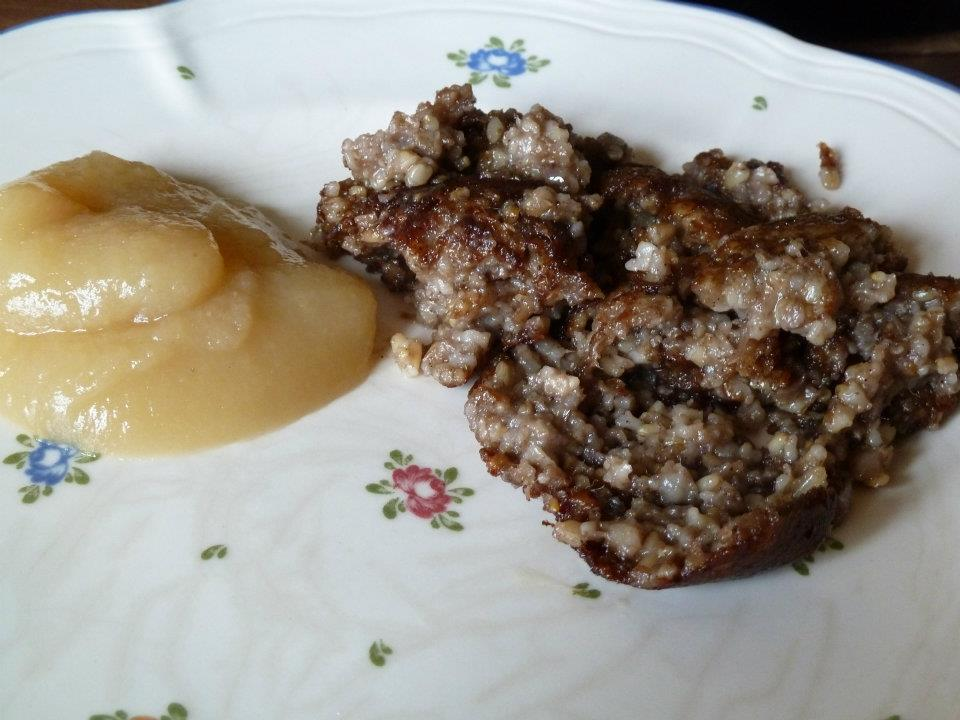
A plate of pan-fried Knipp with apple sauce

Knipp (German pronunciation: [ˈknɪp]; in the Hanover area: Calenberger Pfannenschlag) is a type of sausage made by mixing meat with grains (Grützwurst) related to Pinkel which comes from the Bremen and Lower Saxon regions of Germany.

Knipp is made from oat groats, pork head, pork belly, pork rind, liver and broth and seasoned with salt, allspice and pepper. Knipp is usually sold in roughly 30 cm (12 in) long and 10–15 cm (4–6 in) thick sausages as a Stange ("stick") or Rolle ("roll"). The smoked sausage is sold and consumed having been roasted, either just with bread, or with roast or boiled potatoes and gherkins, sweet and sour pumpkin, apple sauce (Apfelmus) and beetroot or even cold or hot on wholemeal bread. Sometimes crispy, fried slices of Beutelwurst are served with Knipp – this dish is known in Low Saxon as Knipp un Büddelwust.

In the Lüneburg Heath, Knipp is made with Heidschnucke meat and is known as Heidjer Knipp.

In Oldenburg, Knipp is called Hackgrütze.

For a long time, Knipp was considered to be a 'poor man's food', as it is made from offal and from butcher's scraps.

== See also ==
- Westfälische Rinderwurst
- Stippgrütze (similar dish as a Westphalian speciality)
- Goetta
- Scrapple
- List of smoked foods
