= Apple Scrapple Festival =

Coordinates: 38.73983°N 75.60103°W

The Apple Scrapple Festival is held annually during the second weekend in October in Bridgeville, Delaware. It was first held in 1992.

== Overview ==
Notable events include the Ladies' Iron Skillet Toss, the Scrapple Chunkin' Contest, and the Mayor's Scrapple Sling. The name of the festival is derived from two agricultural products which are important to this region, apples and scrapple. The Apple Scrapple Festival was named one of the top 100 events in North America by the American Bus Association.

Because there was no festival in 2020 as a result of the COVID-19 pandemic, the 29th edition was deferred to 2021.
