= Breakfast sausage =

Pork sausage usually served at breakfast in the United States

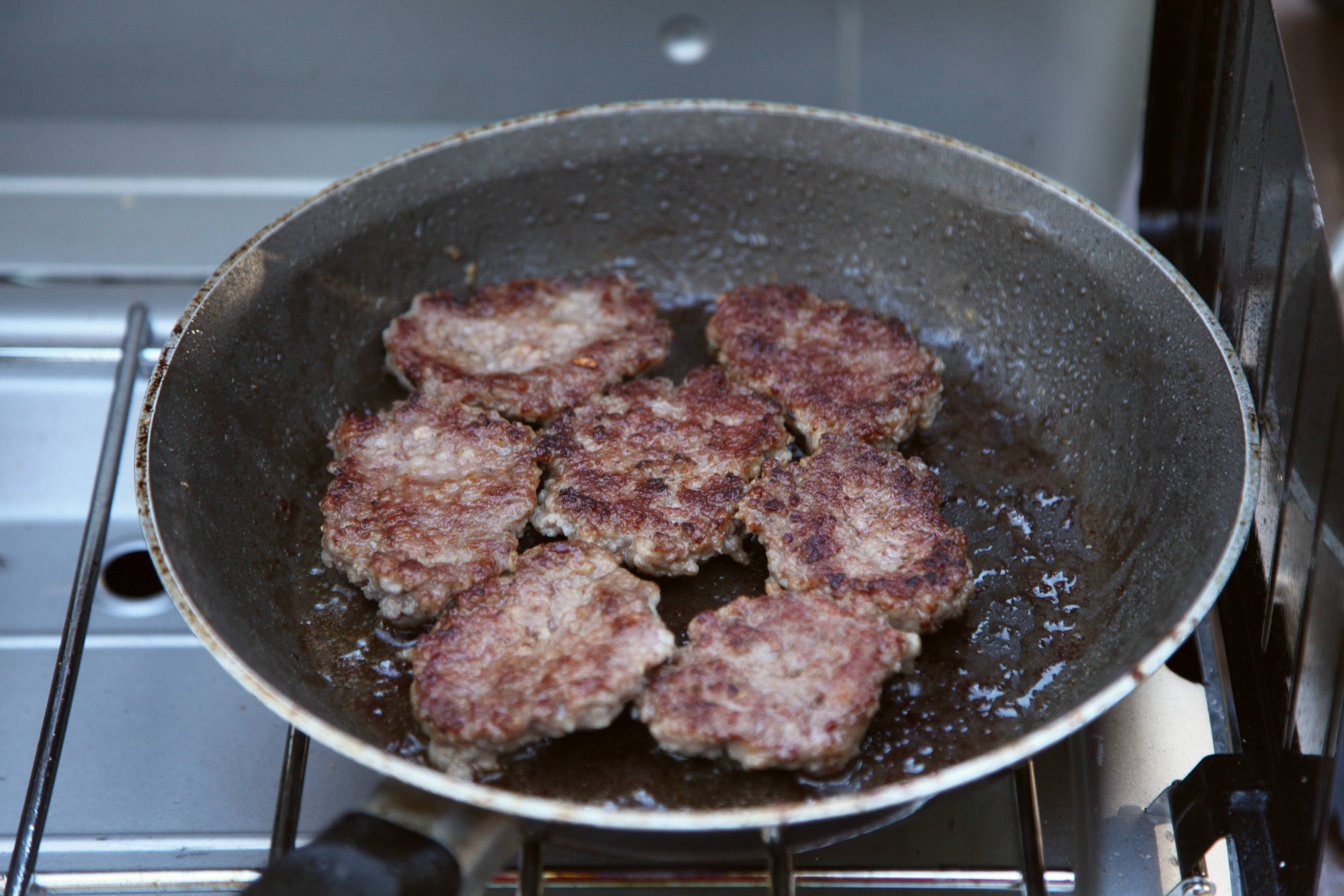
Breakfast sausage patties, frying in a pan

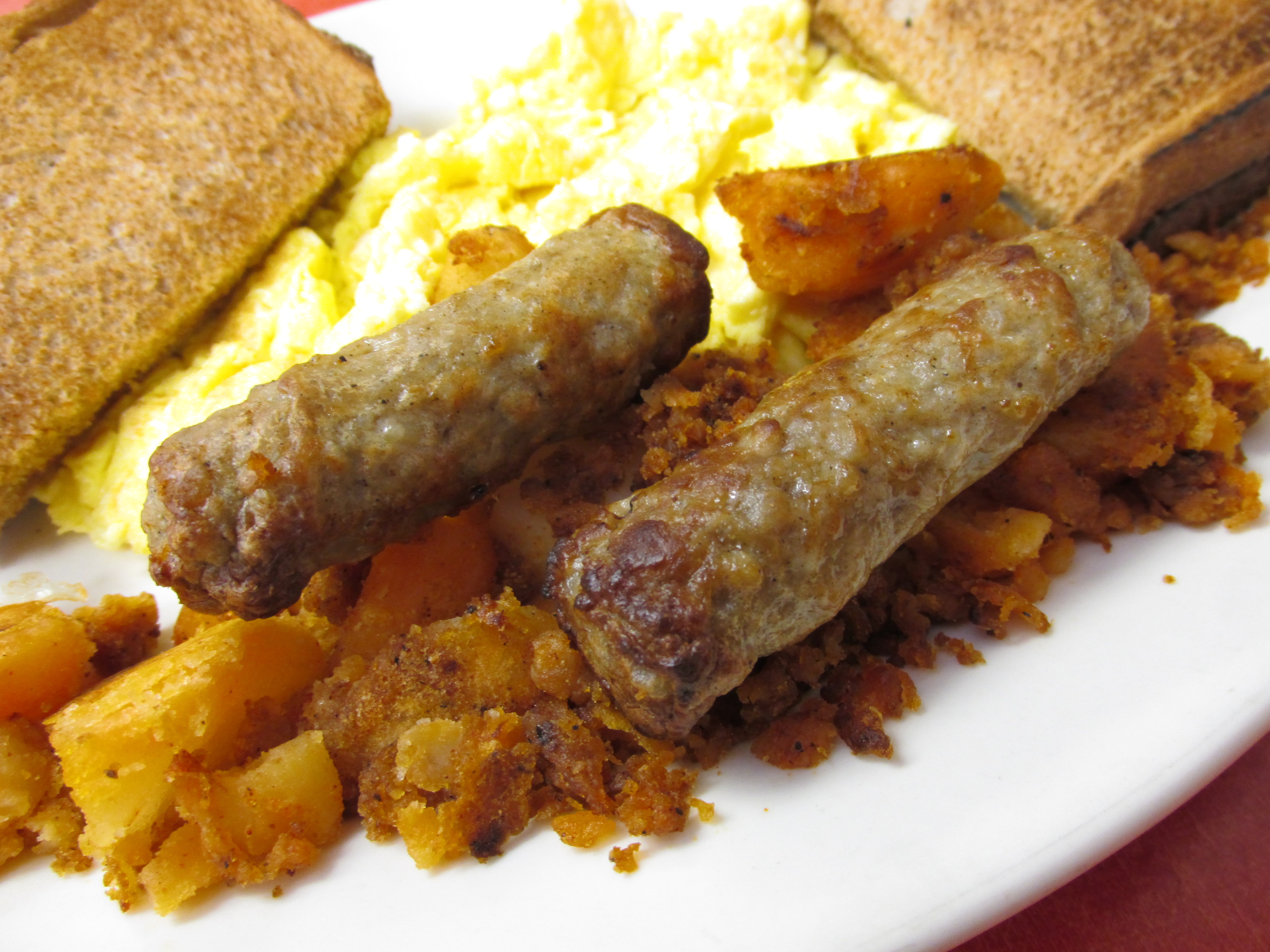
Breakfast sausage links as part of a full breakfast

The breakfast sausage (or country sausage) is a type of fresh sausage, typically made from pork, and a common breakfast food in North America. In Canada, the predominant flavorings used for seasoning are black pepper and sage. There are also varieties seasoned with maple syrup or cayenne pepper. Some breakfast sausage is flavored with cured bacon.

It is a common breakfast item in traditional North American "farmer" or "country" breakfasts, as it originated as a way for farmers to make use of as much of their livestock (usually pigs) as possible. Scraps and trimmings were ground, seasoned and later consumed by the farmer as an inexpensive, high-protein morning meal.

It can be in the form of smoked or fresh patties, links or loose sausage. Most diners, fast-food restaurants, and family restaurants will also carry one or more versions of it during breakfast hours, whether on a sandwich, in a breakfast platter, or both; some fine-dining establishments will also have a sausage option on their breakfast or brunch menu. The cased link variety is most similar to English-style sausages and has been produced in the United States since colonial days; it closely resembles Lincolnshire sausage.

It is essentially a highly seasoned ground meat, so it does not keep and should be stored and handled appropriately. Newer variations made from pork and beef mixtures as well as poultry (turkey or chicken) can also be found. There are also vegetarian varieties that use textured vegetable protein (TVP) in place of meat.

Breakfast sausage is normally fried in a pan, grilled, or microwaved. Maple syrup is sometimes added onto breakfast sausages. Cooked breakfast sausage is also mixed into egg casseroles before baking. Crumbled sausage added to white gravy is the central component of sausage gravy.

== Brands ==
Some common US brands include: Stoltzfus Meats, Wampler's, Bob Evans, Jimmy Dean, Owens Country Sausage, Swaggerty's Farm, Purnell's Old Folks Country Sausage, Tennessee Pride, Johnsonville, Farmland, P.G. Molinari & Sons, Smithfield, and Jones.

== See also ==
- Ćevapi, caseless sausage originating from the Balkans
- Chipolata
- List of brunch foods
- List of smoked foods
