= Balkenbrij =

Traditional Dutch food

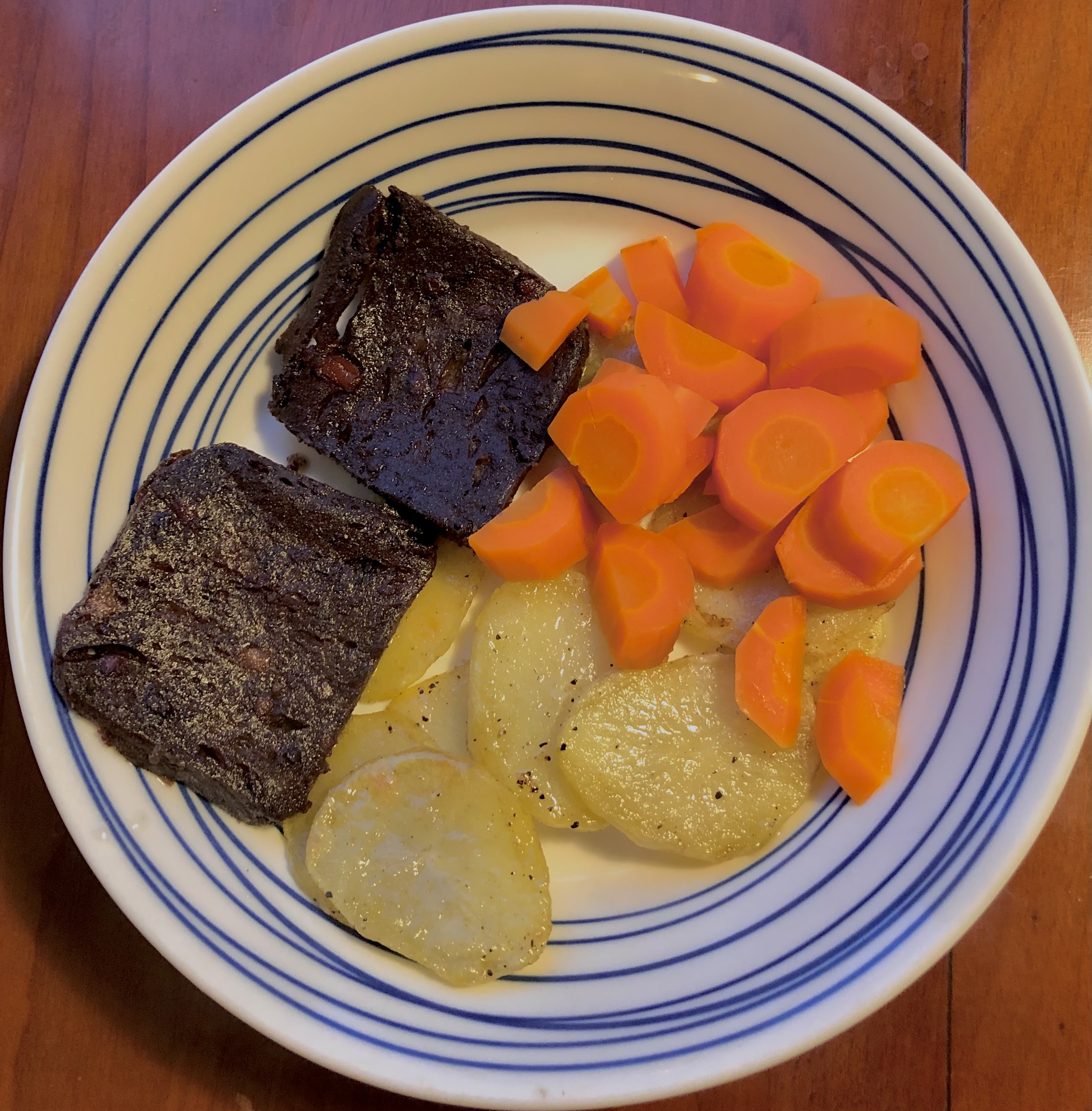
Balkenbrij, potato and carrot

Balkenbrij (also called 'karboet', 'tuet', or 'pannas') is a traditional Dutch food that shares some of the characteristics of American scrapple. Traditionally, its preparation and consumption were an important economizing custom, especially for the rural poor. Particularly, it allowed farmers to use various less-desirable parts of pork, which were made more palatable by being added to a seasoned porridge of groats or flour. The closely related 'Panhas', 'Pannas' or 'Möppkenbrot' are widely known in the whole northwest of Germany; the last variety is a speciality of middle Westphalia and Rhineland.

== Preparation ==
Originally, balkenbrij was prepared on farms at the end of the pig-slaughtering process, in the pot used to cook the swill. It was eaten soon because of its poor shelf life.

It is traditionally made of stock left over from the making of sausages like liverwurst, boiled with flour (and sometimes blood, which turns the color from white to black) and bacon, together with odd scraps and various organ meats of the animal such as liver, kidney or lungs. All of these are cooked, ground, then cooked again with flour (either wheat or buckwheat) or oatmeal, and a special spice mix ("rommelkruid") consisting of liquorice, sugar, anise, cinnamon, clove, white pepper, mace, ginger powder and sandalwood, and finally poured into a pan or mold and cooled off to achieve the form of a loaf. The loaf of balkenbrij is then sliced (about 1 cm thick), and the slices are dusted with flour and fried, traditionally in lard.

Today, products for the broad consumer market are specially made of a planned portion of the slaughtered swine (blood, fat, minor muscle meat and sometimes organ meats such as liver or stomach). A staple ingredient in most German versions is pearl barley.

== Varieties and relatives ==
There are various recipes, and especially well known is the variety from Gelderland with raisins. Balkenbrij is technically a relative of scrapple, and is claimed as a distant relative of black pudding and Scottish haggis though it does not use a casing, the distinctive feature of haggis.

Balkenbrij was one of the classic foods brought by Dutch settlers to the New World. An example of a recipe is given in a 1936 cookbook from Holland, Michigan.
