= Livermush =

US pork and cornmeal dish

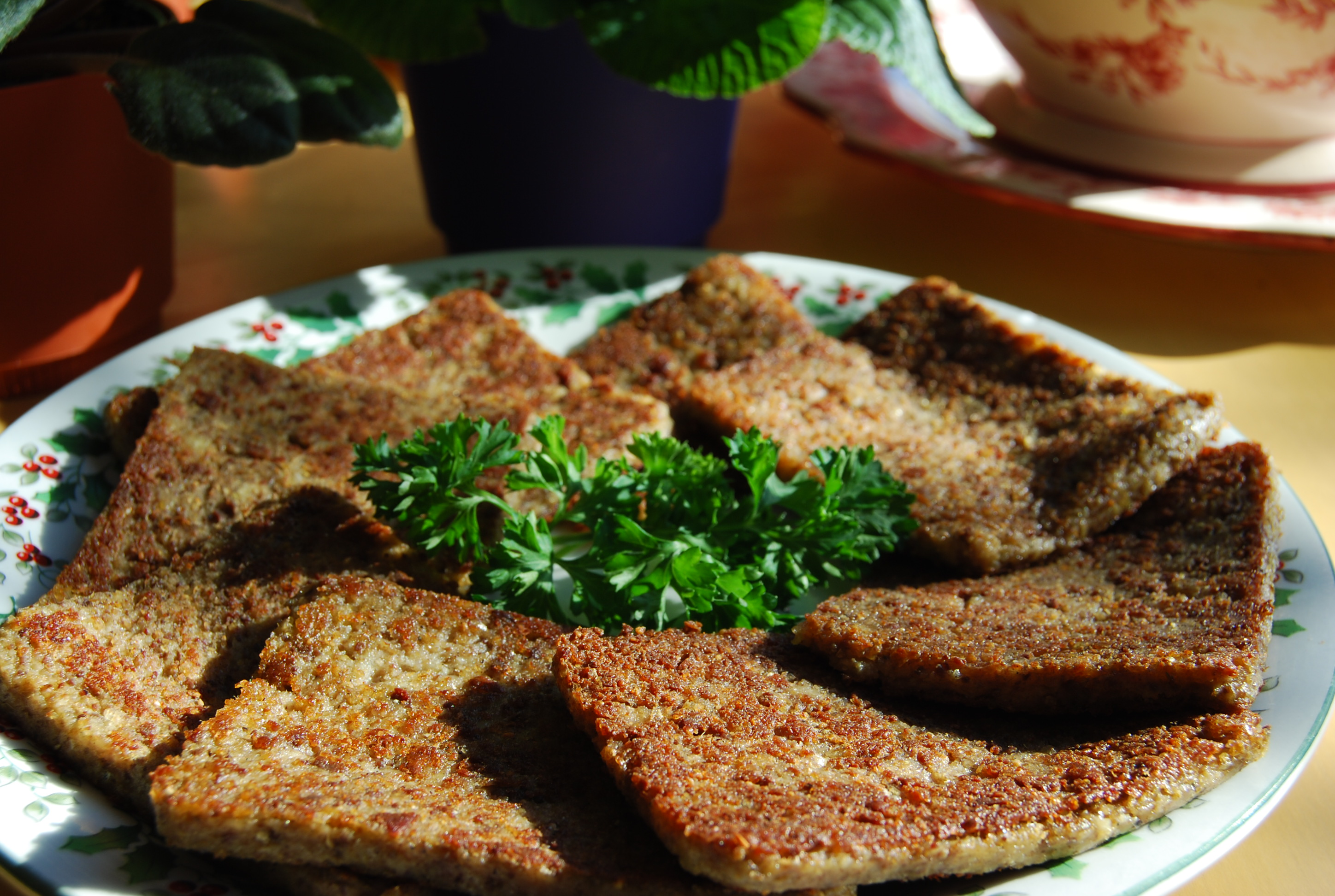
- A pound of sliced, pan-fried livermush garnished with parsley
- Type: Mush (cornmeal)
- Region or state: Western North Carolina
- Main ingredients: Pork parts, liver, cornmeal and spices

Livermush is a Southern United States pork food product prepared using pig liver, parts of pig heads, cornmeal and spices. It is a regional dish that is common in Western North Carolina. It is typically consumed as a breakfast and lunch food. It has been suggested that livermush derives from scrapple. By law in North Carolina, the product must consist of at least 30% pig liver. Several festivals exist in North Carolina that are dedicated to the food.

Though sometimes considered the same as liver pudding, livermush generally contains more cornmeal and is coarser in texture. It is generally prepared using a different recipe than for liver pudding.

== Overview ==
Livermush is composed of pig liver, pig head parts such as snouts and ears, cornmeal and seasonings. It is commonly spiced with pepper and sage. The meat ingredients are all cooked and then ground, after which the cornmeal and seasoning is added. The final mixture is formed into blocks which are then refrigerated. It typically has a low fat content and a high protein content.

It is a regional cuisine that is commonly found in the western part of North Carolina, as well as being noticeably present in central North Carolina. It is also consumed in other parts of the state, and is available in some areas in other states as well, such as Georgia, Virginia and areas in Florida. Livermush is mass-produced in Shelby, North Carolina by two meat packing companies, Jenkins Foods and Mack’s Liver Mush and Meat Co., who distribute it to various states.

It is cooked by cutting a slice off of a premade loaf and frying it. At breakfast it is served alongside grits and eggs. For lunch it can be made into a sandwich with mayonnaise, grape jelly or mustard, either fried, or left cold. As livermush's popularity has risen, it has appeared as an ingredient in dishes such as omelettes and pizzas.

== History ==
It has been suggested that livermush derives from scrapple, and likely originated from German settlers who traveled south through the Appalachian Mountains in the 1700s. These German immigrants ate pon hoss, a spiced pork and buckwheat mixture that evolved into livermush. Livermush became popular in factory towns, where workers needed affordable, premade food. The dish experienced a resurgence during the Great Depression. In the 1930s and 1940s, a five-pound portion of livermush cost around 10 cents.

In North Carolina today, genuine livermush must consist of at least 30% pig liver by law.

== Events ==
Shelby, North Carolina hosts an annual Livermush Exposition, which began in 1987 to celebrate the unique delicacy. In that year the Cleveland County Commissioners and the Shelby City Council passed resolutions proclaiming that "livermush is the most delicious, most economical and most versatile of meats." Other towns in North Carolina that have livermush festivals include Drexel and Marion.

== See also ==
- Cuisine of the Southern United States
- Scrapple
- Goetta
- List of pork dishes
- Liverwurst
- Pâté
- Sisig
