= Buckwheat gateau =

German layer cake with cranberry filling

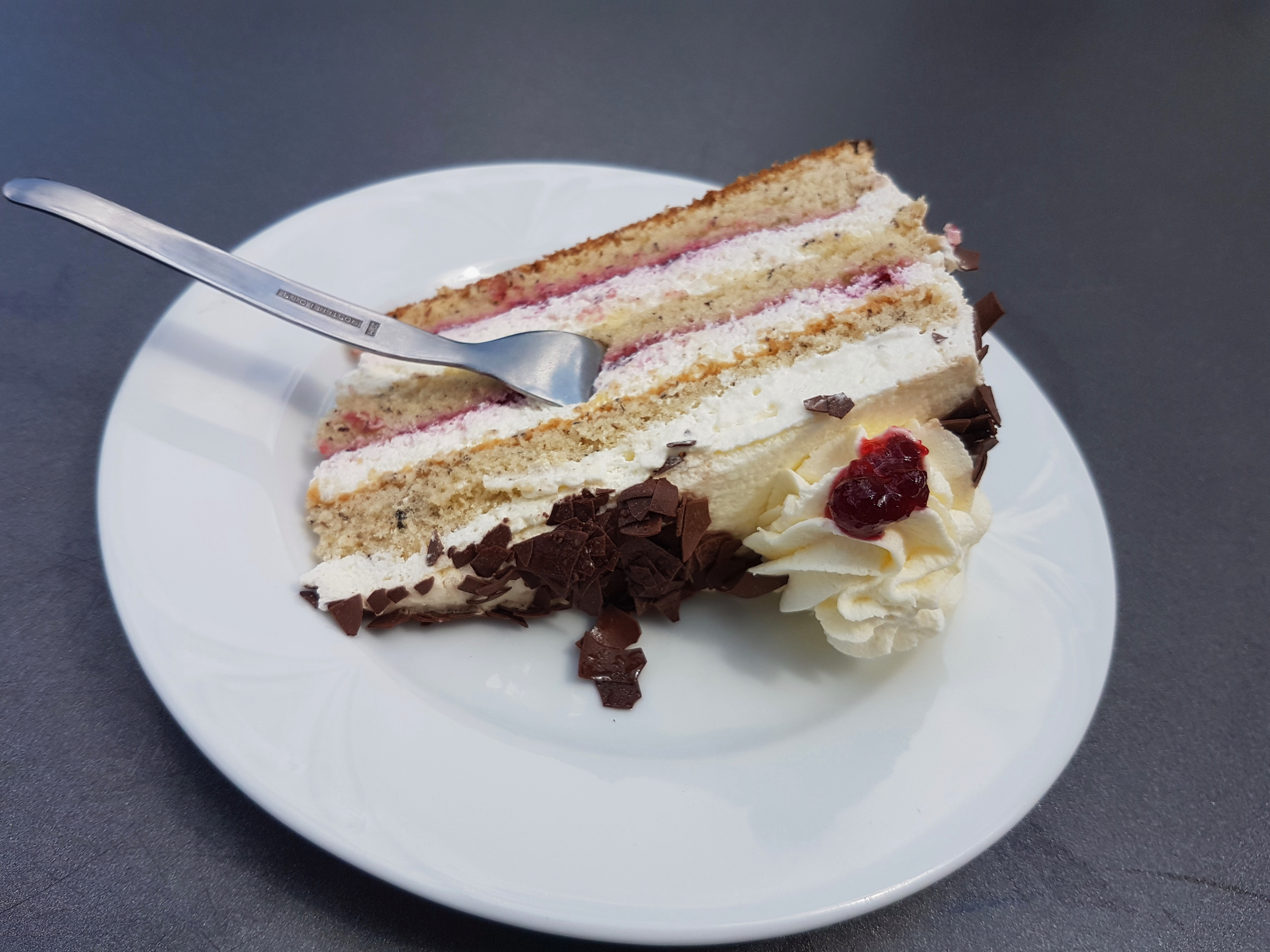
- Alternative names: Buckwheat torte
- Course: Dessert
- Place of origin: Germany
- Region or state: Lüneburg Heath
- Main ingredients: Buckwheat flour, heather honey, yoghurt, cranberries, whipped cream, chocolate

Buckwheat gateau or Buckwheat torte (German: Buchweizentorte, pronounced [ˈbuːxvaɪ̯t͜sn̩ˌtɔʁtə]) is a dessert that is a speciality of the Lüneburg Heath region of Lower Saxony in northern Germany.

The gateau consists of layers of cake made from buckwheat flour and heather honey, separated by a fruit layer using yoghurt and cranberries and topped by whipped cream and chocolate shavings.

== See also ==
- Lower Saxon cuisine
- Black Forest gateau
