= Habbersett =

- Current owner: Jones Dairy Farm
- Country: United States
- Introduced: 1863
- Markets: Scrapple and meat products
- Website: www.habbersettscrapple.com

Habbersett is a brand of meat products founded in 1863 known for its production of scrapple. The brand was founded in Middletown (Media), Pennsylvania, and moved to Bridgeville, Delaware. Habbersett is currently owned by Jones Dairy Farm.

== Products ==
Habbersett produces meat based products. The brand's primary focus is scrapple, a popular pork product in the regions of Pennsylvania, Baltimore, Washington, D.C., New Jersey, Maryland, Delaware, southern New York and the Delmarva Peninsula. The brand also offers beef scrapple. Habbersett and Rapa, both owned by Jones Dairy Farm, are the two largest brands for scrapple. Both brands can be found in a majority of mid-Atlantic stores.

American food writer and historian, Joshua Ozersky, considered Habbersett the best brand of scrapple.

== Company history ==
Ed Habbersett, former president of the company, claimed "scrapple was invented in colonial times out of a uniquely American set of circumstances".

In 1863, Isaac S. Habbersett began mass-producing scrapple in Middletown (Media), Delaware County, Pennsylvania. Habbersett is one of the oldest brands in scrapple production. Little has changed about the product since production began.

In 1926, Delaware-based scrapple brand, Rapa, began mass production. The brands would become the two largest in the Philadelphia scrapple market, with Habbersett controlling nearly half and Rapa controlling approximately a quarter. In 1981, Wisconsin based company, Jones Dairy Farm, acquired Rapa.

In 1985, Johnsonville Foods acquired Habbersett and sold it to Jones Dairy Farm in 1988. After purchasing Habbersett, Jones Dairy Farm shut down the original plant in Middletown and moved it to Bridgeville, Delaware. Both Habbersett and Rapa now produce meats out of the same building located at 103 S Railroad Ave in Bridgeville. The two brands are processed separately.
