= Westfälische Rinderwurst =

Type of German sausage

Westfälische Rinderwurst (German pronunciation: [vɛstˌfɛːlɪʃə ˈʁɪndɐˌvʊʁst], lit. 'Westphalian beef sausage') is a type of German sausage known as a Grützwurst and is made from beef, beef dripping, vegetables, pearl barley or groats and butter. This Westphalian speciality is served hot, heated in water or roasted, and eaten with bread, boiled potatoes and the like.

The Calenberger Pfannenschlag or Knipp is a very similar dish from the Calenberg Land near Hanover, which can however be made from pork.

== See also ==
- Frankfurter Rindswurst
- Stippgrütze
