= Liverwurst =

Type of sausage

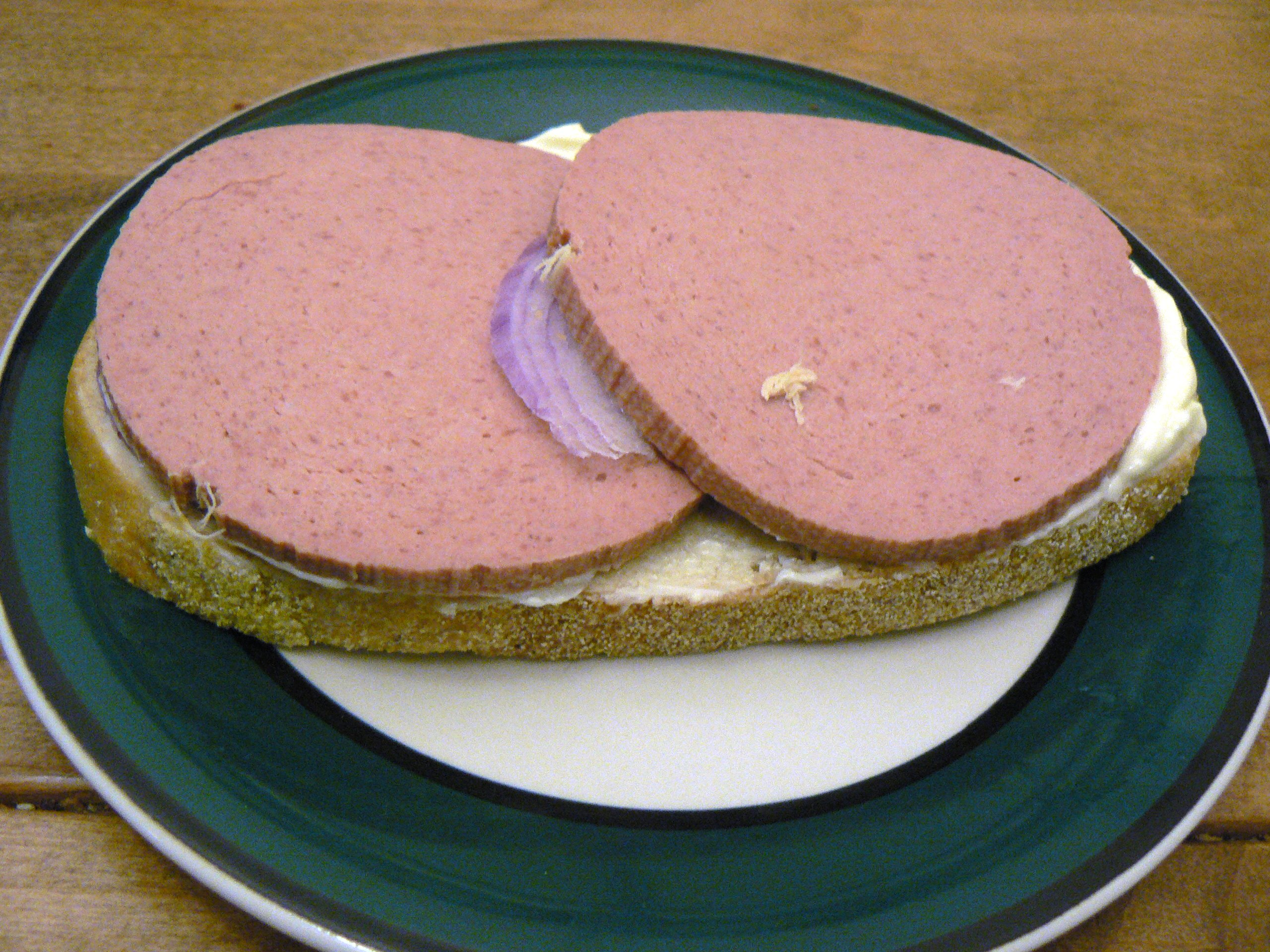
Slices of liverwurst on bread

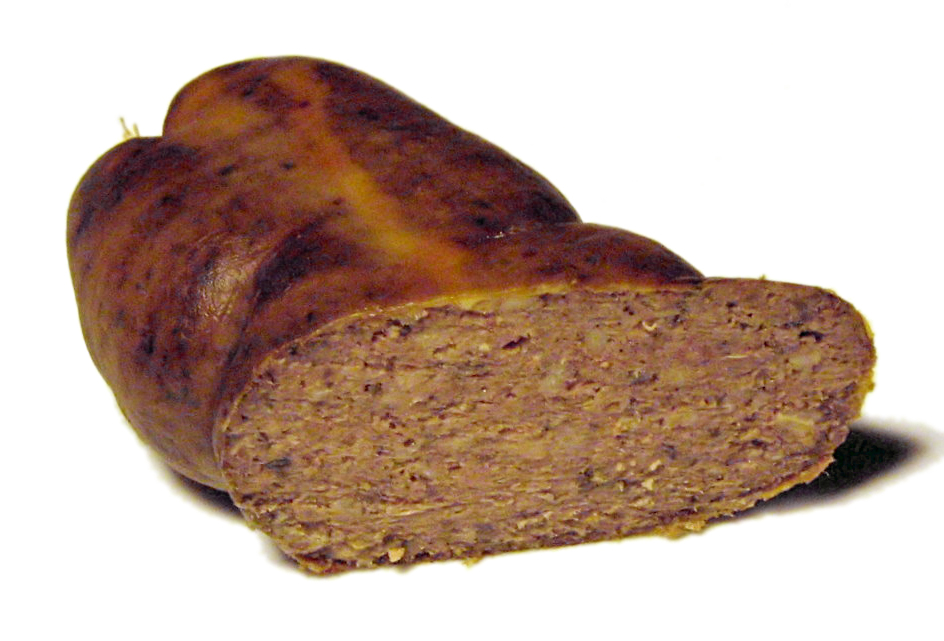
Liverwurst, boiled and smoked

Liverwurst, leberwurst, or liver sausage is a type of spreadable sausage made from liver. It is eaten throughout Europe, particularly Northern Germany, as well as North and South America, notably amongst the large German diaspora in Argentina and Chile.

Some liverwurst varieties are spreadable. Liverwurst usually contains pigs' or calves' liver. Other ingredients are meat (notably veal), fat, and spices including ground black pepper, marjoram, allspice, thyme, ground mustard seed, and nutmeg. Many regions in Germany have distinct recipes for liverwurst. Adding ingredients like pieces of onion or bacon to the recipe makes each variety of liverwurst very important to cultural identity. For example, the Thüringer Leberwurst (Thuringian liverwurst) has a Protected Geographical Status throughout the EU. Recently, more exotic additions such as cowberries and mushrooms have gained popularity.

== Etymology ==
The word liverwurst is a partial calque of German Leberwurst (pronounced [ˈleːbɐˌvʊʁst]) lit. 'liver sausage'; and 'liver sausage' is a full calque thereof.

A fourteenth-century mention in Latin however uses the term "liverworsted": "Hec fercula dari solent magna sulta, porrum, pulli, farti seu repleti, ferina apri, carnes piperis, XII tybie gesenghet, XII pulli in suffene seu sorbicio, liverworsted gherostet, assaturam, magnas carnes, oblatas et crumbrod."

== Variants ==
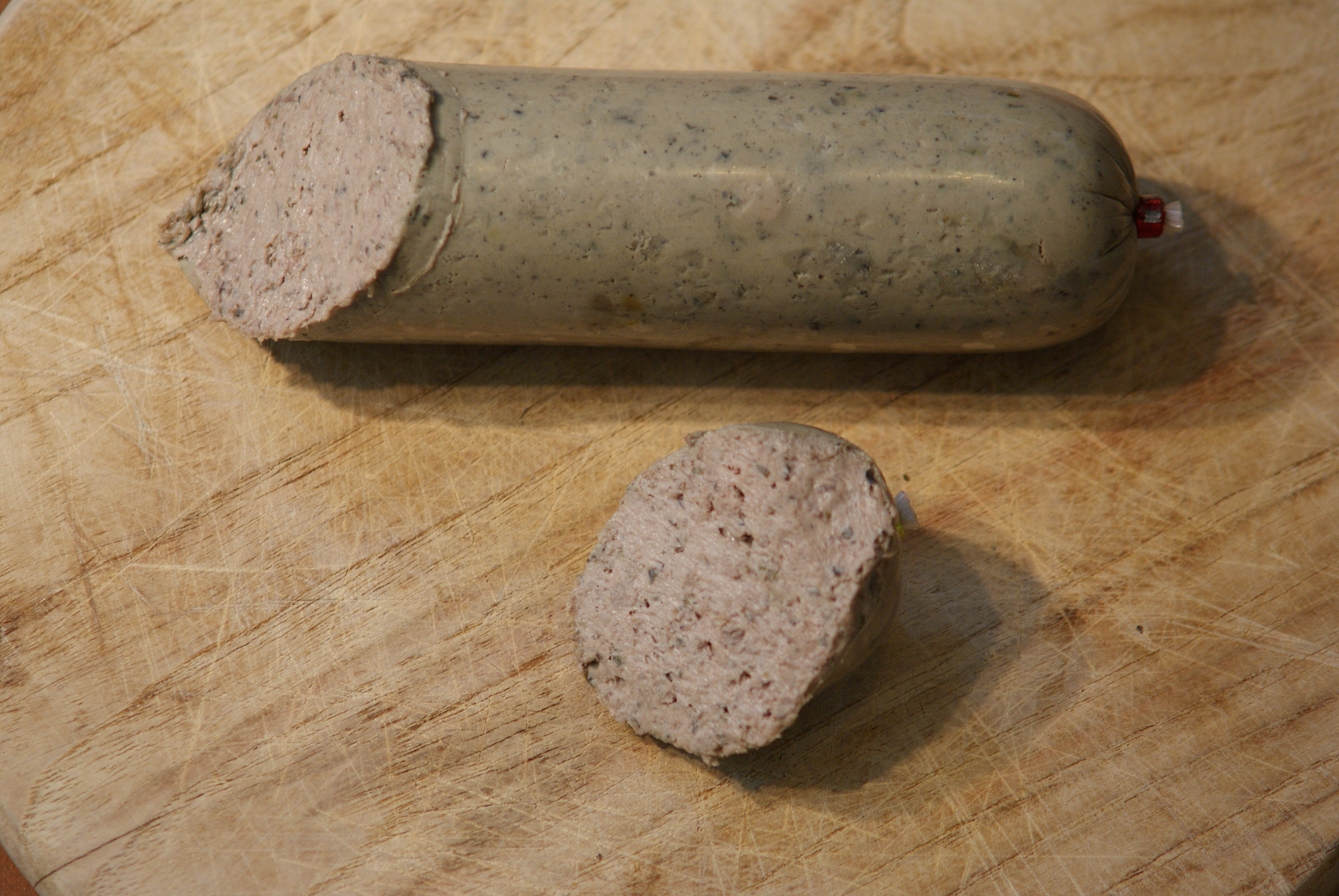
Liverwurst from the Rhineland-Palatinate in Germany

In some parts of Germany, liverwurst is served sliced on a plate, often with mustard or pickled cucumber. It is most commonly eaten spread on bread, as it is very soft.

In the Netherlands, liverwurst (Dutch: leverworst) is customarily served in slices, often with mustard. Groningen and The Hague are known for their own types of liverwurst: Groninger leverworst in Groningen and Haagse leverworst from The Hague.

In Hungary, liverwurst is customarily served on open sandwiches, or with cheese as a filling for pancakes which are baked in the oven.

In Italy, the closest relative to liverwurst is mazzafegato where some variations can contain orange zest and fennel seeds.

In Romania, liverwurst is called lebărvurst, lebăr, or cârnat de ficat. Unlike the German sausage Leberwurst that uses beef, the lebăr uses only pork.

Lebăr is eaten mainly for the winter holidays. It tastes fragrant and sweet with liver pâté. It is generally used as Christmas Eve dinner, sliced on bread with mustard and murături.

Liverwurst is typically eaten as is, and often served as traditional or as open-faced sandwiches. It is popular in North America with red onion and mustard on rye or whole-grain bread. In the Southern and Midwestern US, liverwurst is served with slices of sweet pickles (gherkins pickled with vinegar, sugar, and mustard seeds). In the Northeast US, liverwurst is served with dill pickles (gherkins pickled with vinegar, salt, and dill).

In the Midwestern US, liverwurst is also known as liver sausage. If smoked, it is known as braunschweiger. Liverwurst is typically served on crackers or in sandwiches. It is often sold pre-sliced.

The Polish pasztetowa is made using calf's liver. It is often served on rye bread with horseradish-style mustard. Pasztetowa is popular throughout the year, but is most frequently served at Christmas and Easter.

== See also ==
- Chopped liver
- List of smoked foods
- Livermush
- Liver pâté
- Mazzafegato
