= Speckkuchen =

German quiche

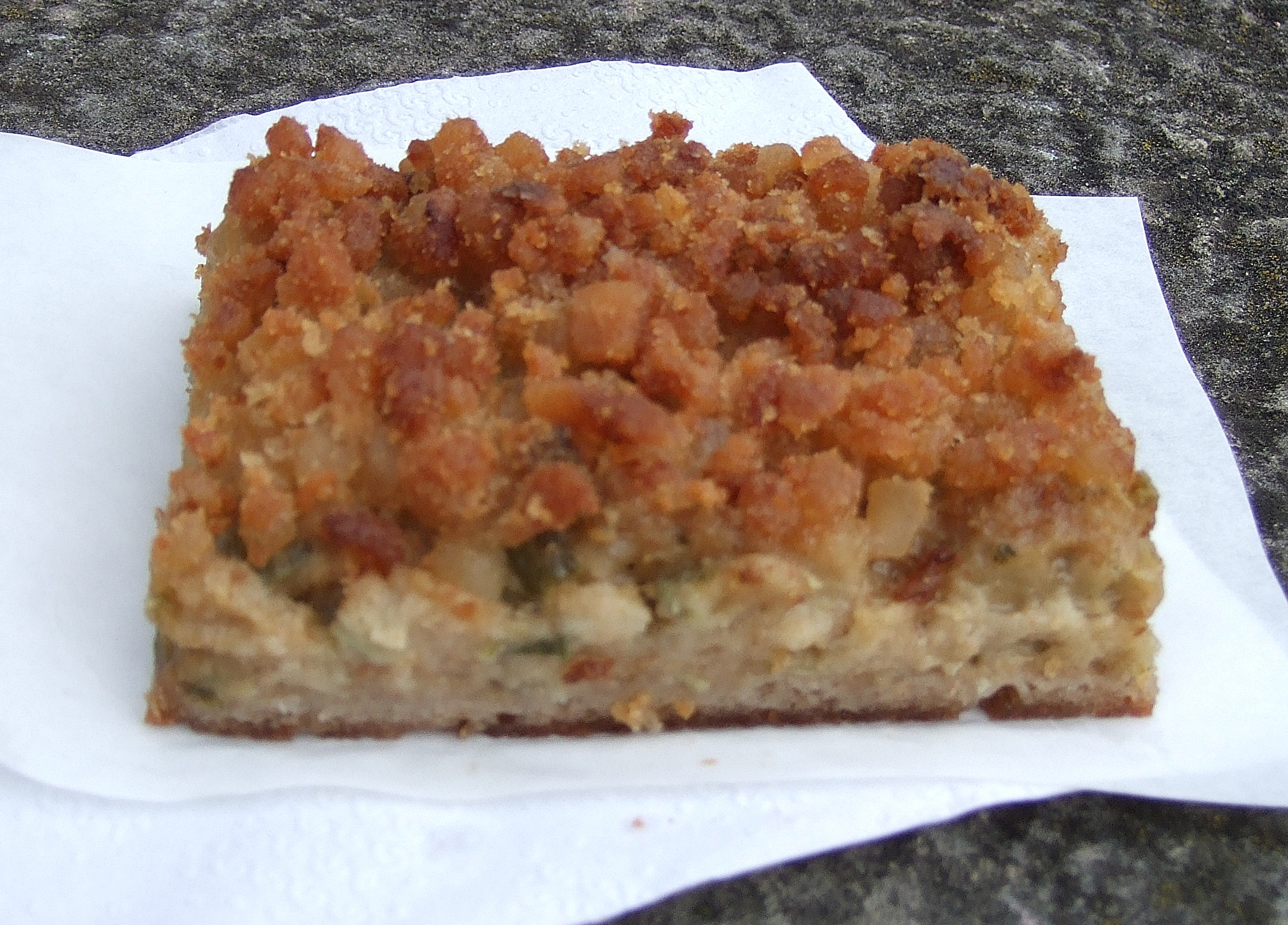
- Type: Quiche
- Place of origin: Germany
- Region or state: Hesse
- Main ingredients: Rye flour crust, bacon, eggs; leeks or onions

Speckkuchen is a type of quiche, a specialty of northern Hesse, Germany. It is a bacon pie/flan with a rye flour crust on the base and made with eggs, and in some villages contains high proportion of leeks or onions. It is popular as a quick snack in Kassel, especially on market days, sold at food stalls and bakeries. As with many regional specialties, every village and every baker has his own Speckkuchen recipe.
