= Mazzafegato =

Italian sausage

Mazzafegato or mazafegghito is a sausage produced in central Italy. It comes from the upper Tiber Valley, Valtiberina (where it is also called sambudello), in Tuscany and Umbria, and from Marche.

== Etymology ==
The name means 'killing/butchering liver' (ammazza fegato).

== Production ==
Mazzafegato is produced with the same mixture as sausage or soppressata, mainly composed of second- and third-choice meat (scraps), and about 15% pork liver or other offal.

It is seasoned with salt, pepper, possibly garlic, and pine nuts in the Umbrian recipe, and is stuffed into a small-diameter casing previously washed and flavored in hot wine. The mazzafegato from the Camerte area, in the upper Marche region, may contain orange peel in small quantities or, alternatively, fennel flower. A sweet version is also common in Umbria, which involves the addition of modest quantities of orange peel, sugar and raisins. The production of the area of Fano nell'Urbinate is called salsiccia matta (lit. 'crazy sausage').

This sausage was made during butchering season, and it was typical for the family to make it and eat it together. It was grilled and served with wild greens. Reportedly its production has dwindled, with the risk of disappearing, as there is not much of a market for this kind of intensely flavored product.
