= Haddekuche =

German spice cake

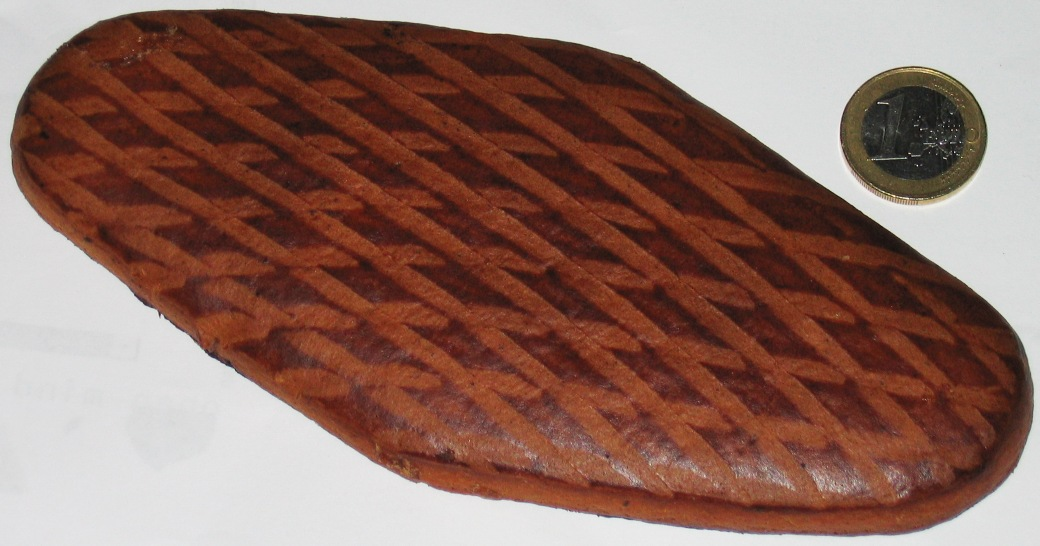
- Frankfurter Haddekuchen
- Type: Gingerbread
- Place of origin: Germany
- Region or state: Frankfurt

Haddekuche is a traditional biscuit made in Frankfurt, Hesse; Rhenish Hesse; and other parts of South Hessen, Germany. It closesly resembles a diamond-shaped gingerbread with a diamond-themed pattern imprinted on the biscuit itself. The word "Haddekuche" is Hessian dialect for Standard German harter Kuchen meaning "hard cake". This is most likely because it tends to dry relatively quickly and then become very hard.

Haddekuche has often been made and produced in Frankfurt by pretzel vendors that roam the Apfelwein bars in the city (primarily in Sachsenhausen, Heddernheim, and Niederursel) and other parts of the region, but availability of the biscuit has diminished considerably over the years and some claim the biscuit has almost gone extinct. One of the few bakeries left selling the biscuit claims they only sell 30 of them a month across two branches, mostly to tourists. The diamond pattern on the biscuit closely resembles the pattern of another item strongly associated with Hessen—the Geripptes drinking glass for Apfelwein. Owing to the baking process and the need to protect the biscuit from damage during transport, the edges of the biscuit are rounded.

The biscuit is also featured in the popular 1980s song Die Hesse komme! ("the Hessians are coming!") by the Rodgau Monotones, in which they jokingly compare many Hessian delicacies such as Handkäse with more typical German cuisine.

Another use for the biscuit is as a form of thickening agent in sauces with dishes such as Sauerbraten.

== Literature ==
- Rita Hens: Frankfurt: Reisen mit Insider-Tipps. Marco Lolo Verlag, Lonely Planet 2014.
