= Heidegeist =

Herbal liqueur

Heidegeist (also: guter Heidegeist) is a herbal liqueur that is sold especially in the area of the Lüneburg Heath in northern Germany. The name means "heath spirit" or "heath ghost".

Heidegeist contains a total of 31 heather ingredients and has an alcohol content of 50%. It is clear in colour and has a strong, minty taste.

Originally manufactured by C.W. Baland & Langebartels from Celle, Heidegeist is now produced, like its sister spirit, Ratzeputz, by Schwarz & Schlichte in Oelde. It is sold in five different bottle sizes and is available in chocolate form with a liquid centre.

The schnaps is drunk well-chilled and neat or is used in cocktails and for cooking. In the Lüneburg Heath, it is often mixed with the ginger flavoured schnaps, Ratzeputz, the resulting drink going by the name of 108er; being derived from the addition of the alcohol content of the two spirits: 50% and 58%.
