= Ratzeputz =

German alcoholic spirit brand

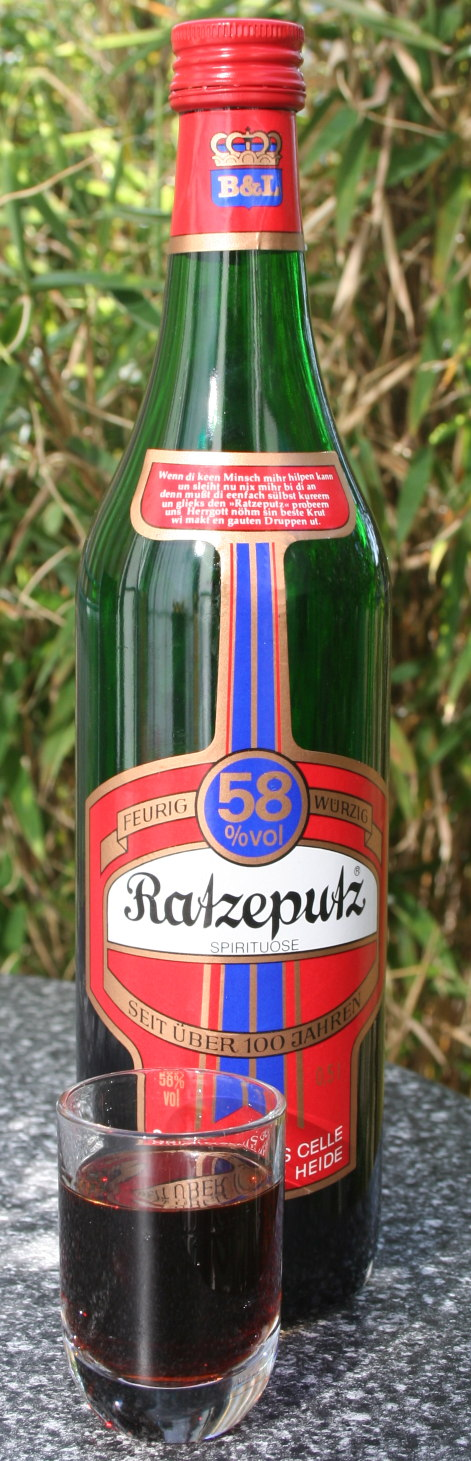
Ratzeputz bottle

Ratzeputz (German: [ˈʁat͡səˈpʊt͡s]) is a schnaps, a type of spirit popular in Germany, which contains extracts and distillates of root ginger. The fresh ginger it contains is said to be beneficial to the stomach.

As of 2006, Ratzeputz contains only 58% alcohol, whereas higher concentrations were common in the past. The ingredients, which are found by most consumers to be sharp, are intended to leave a long aftertaste in the mouth and throat.

Ratzeputz was first created in 1877 by Peter Weidmann, a distiller in Celle. In the town, the Lüneburg Heath region and its surrounding area, Ratzeputz is a well-known, high-alcohol spirit-based speciality. Its strong but delicate ginger flavour has helped it gain considerable international attention as well. Originally bottled by C.W. Baland & Langebartels in Celle, it is now made under licence by Schwarze and Schlichte in Oelde.

Until several years ago Ratzeputz was distilled in the centre of Celle. The reason why the strong smell in the town at weekends has gone is due to the transfer of its production to an industrial estate in Westercelle. The sales outlet immediately next to the distillery (between Neuer Straße and Zöllnerstraße) in the town centre has also been closed and the number of different bottle sizes has been reduced. The original products are still easy to obtain, however, at least in Celle.

A mix of Ratzeputz with the herb-based spirit Heidegeist under the name 108er is especially common in the Lüneburg Heath, its name being derived by adding their alcohol contents of 58% and 50% together.

Several bars in Germany specialize in serving Ratzeputz, the most notable being Ratzeputz Bar on Weserstrasse, Neukölln, Berlin.
