= Kishka (food) =

Type of sausage from Eastern Europe

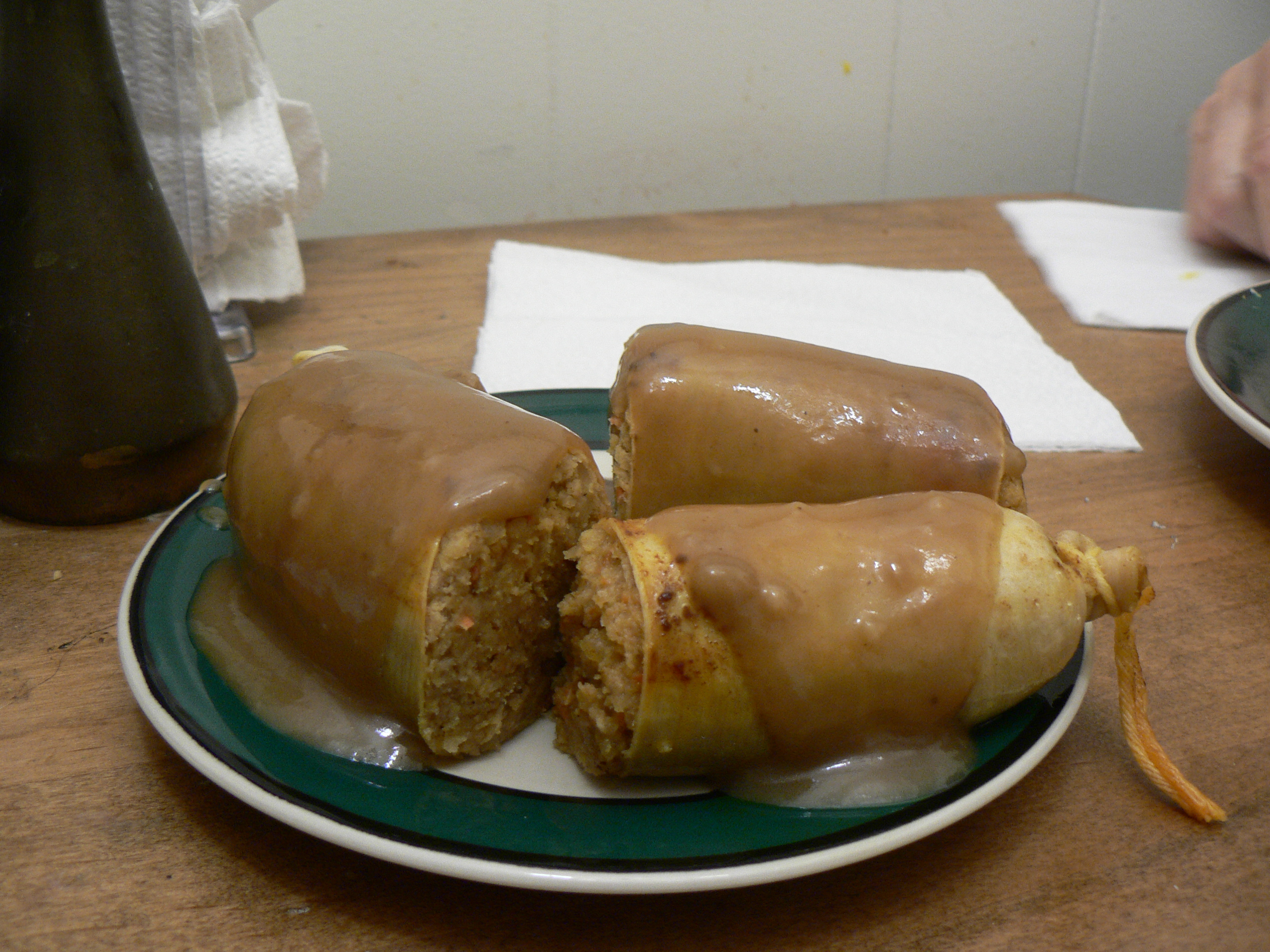
A plate of Ashkenazi-style kishka using synthetic casing

Kishka or kishke (Belarusian: кішка, kishka [ˈkʲiʂka]; Czech: jelito [ˈjɛlɪto]; Slovak: krvavnica [ˈkr̩vaʋɲit͡sa] (regionally also hurka - in Eastern Slovakia, this already contains cooked blood, unlike the krvavnica); Polish: kiszka / kaszanka; Romanian: chişcă/caltaboș; Yiddish: קישקע : kishke; Hebrew קישקע; Russian: кишка [kʲɪʂˈka]; Ukrainian: кишка [ˈkɪʃkɐ]; also Slovene: krvavica/kašnica; Lithuanian: vėdarai; Hungarian: hurka [ˈhurkɒ]) refers to various types of sausage or stuffed intestine with a filling made from a combination of meat and meal, often grain or potato. The dish is popular across Eastern Europe as well as with immigrant communities from those areas. It is also eaten by Ashkenazi Jews who prepare their version according to kashrut dietary laws.

The name kishke is Slavic in origin, and literally means "gut" or "intestine". It may be related to the Ancient Greek word κύστις (kystis), "bladder", as both words refer to a hollow viscus.

== Description ==
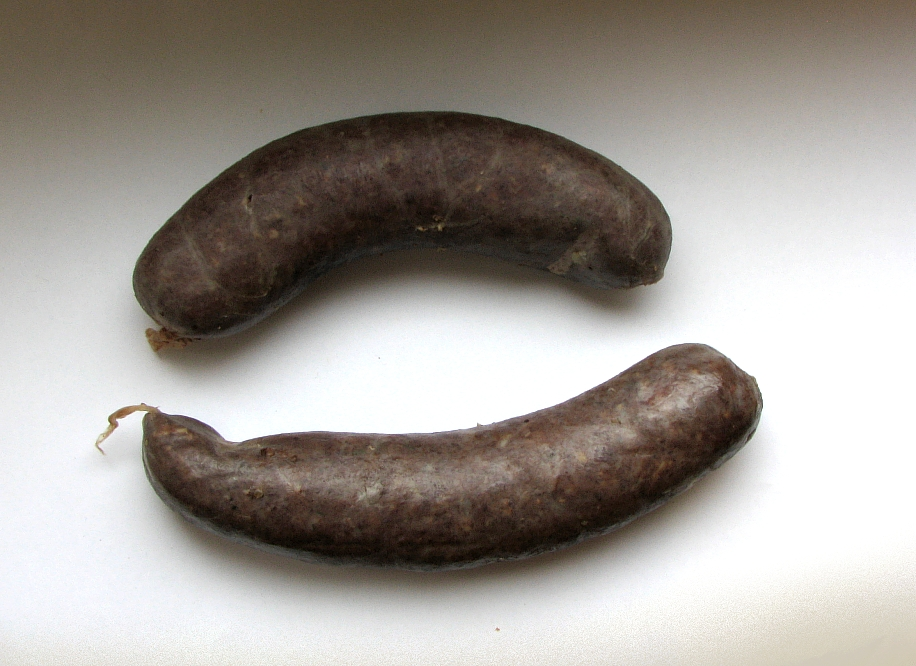
Silesian krupniok

One Eastern European kishka type is kaszanka, a blood sausage made with pig's blood and buckwheat or barley, with pig intestines used as a casing. Similar to black pudding, it is traditionally served at breakfast.

Kishkas can also be made with an organ meat, such as liver and various grain stuffings. The cooked kishke can range in color from grey-white to brownish-orange, depending on how much paprika is used and the other ingredients. Greater Białystok Area kiszka is usually made in a way very similar to the Jewish kishke, but in the majority of cases, pig intestines are used, and ground potatoes are the main ingredient. There are also vegetarian kishka recipes.

The sausages are popular in areas of the Midwestern United States, where many Poles emigrated. There are numerous mail order companies and delis that sell various kishkas. As blood is often used as an ingredient, kishkas are considered an acquired taste. Kosher kishka recipes omit animal blood and pork products.

=== Jewish cuisine ===
Kishke, also known as stuffed derma (from Darm, "intestine"), is a Jewish dish traditionally made from flour or matzo meal, schmaltz and spices. In modern cooking, synthetic casings often replace the beef intestine. Kishke is a common addition to Ashkenazi-style cholent.

Prepared kishke is sold in some kosher butchers and delicatessens; in Israel it is available in the frozen food section of most supermarkets. Non-traditional varieties include kishke stuffed with rice and kishke stuffed with diced chicken livers and ground gizzards. There are also vegetarian kishke recipes.

The stuffed sausage is usually placed on top of the assembled cholent and cooked overnight in the same pot. Alternatively it can be cooked in salted water with vegetable oil added or baked in a dish, and served separately with flour-thickened gravy made from the cooking liquids.

== "Who Stole the Kishka?" ==
"Who Stole the Kishka?" is a polka song written in the 1950s by Walter Dana with lyrics by Walt Solek. It has been recorded and performed by various bands. One popular version familiar to American radio audiences was from a 1963 recording by Grammy award-winning polka artist Frankie Yankovic. It is an homage to kiszka, also known as kaszanka.

Depending on the performer, the song can also include references to other Polish foods such as szynka, chruściki/faworki, pierogi, sernik/serniczek and kielbasa.

== See also ==
- Haggis
- Helzel
- Jewish cuisine
