= Kaszanka =

Traditional European blood sausage

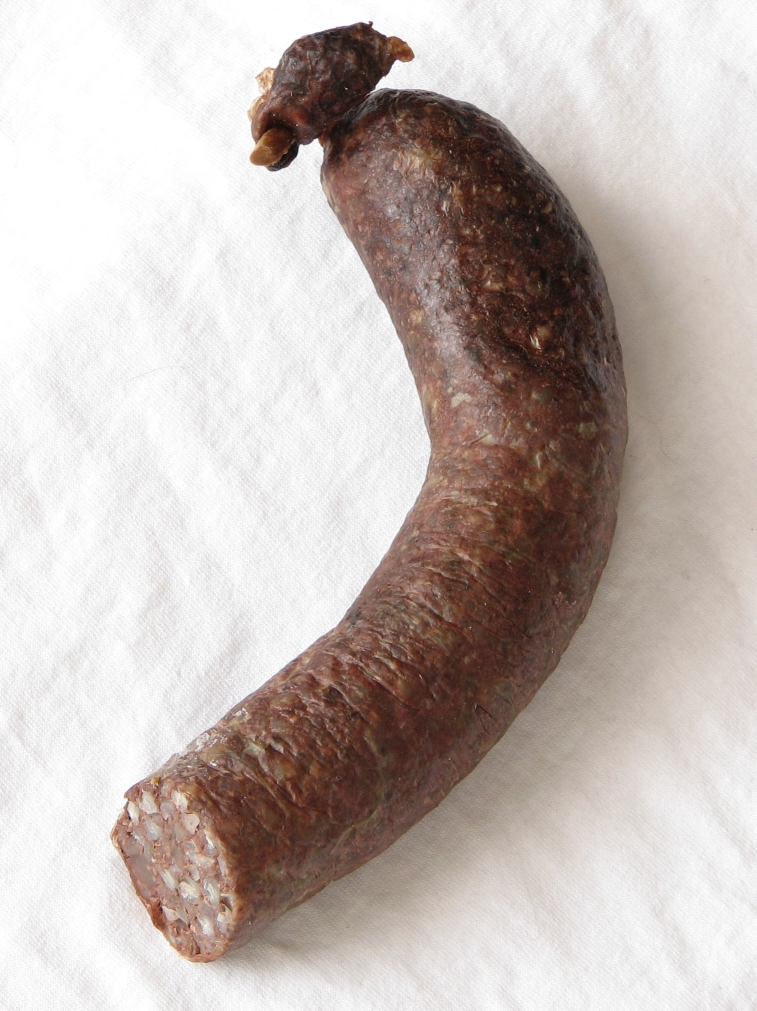
- Traditional kaszanka
- Alternative names: Kiszka; Grützwurst; Knipp; Krupniok (see list below)
- Type: Blood sausage
- Course: Appetizer, main
- Place of origin: Germany or Denmark
- Region or state: Central and Eastern Europe
- Serving temperature: Hot, cold
- Main ingredients: Pork; pig's blood; pig offal; kasha; onion; black pepper; marjoram

Kaszanka is a traditional blood sausage in Central and Eastern European cuisine. It is made of a mixture of pig's blood, pork offal (commonly liver), and buckwheat (kasha) or barley stuffed in a pig intestine. It is usually flavored with onion, black pepper, and marjoram.

The dish likely originated in Germany or Denmark.

Kaszanka may be eaten cold, but traditionally, it is either grilled or fried with onions and then served with potatoes and sauerkraut.

== Other names and similar dishes ==
- крывянка (Kryvianka, Belarus)
- verivorst (Estonia)
- kaszanka (Poland)
- Kiszka (Yiddish קישקע kishke, some districts of Poland)
- Grützwurst (Germany and sometimes Silesia)
- Knipp (Lower Saxony, Germany)
- Göttwust; Grüttwust (Northern Germany)
- krupńok; krupniok (more of a slight name difference than variation; Silesia)
- żymlok (a variation of Krupniok based on cut bread roll instead of buckwheat; Silesia)
- Pinkel (Northwest Germany)
- Stippgrütze (Westphalia, Germany)
- Westfälische Rinderwurst (Westphalia, Germany)
- krëpnica (Kashubia)
- Maischel (Carinthia, Austria): Grützwurst without blood and not cased in intestine but worked into balls in caul fat. The name comes from the Slovenian majželj, in turn derived from the Bavarian Maisen ("slices").
- jelito (Czechia)
- krvavnička (Slovakia)
- hurka (Slovakia)
- véres hurka (Hungarian)
- кров'янка (krovyanka, Ukraine)
- krvavica (Serbia; Slovenia)
- кървавица (Bulgaria)
- chișcă (Romania)

== See also ==
- Ryynimakkara
- Saumagen
- Black pudding
- Haggis
