= Stippgrütze =

German barley and sausage dish

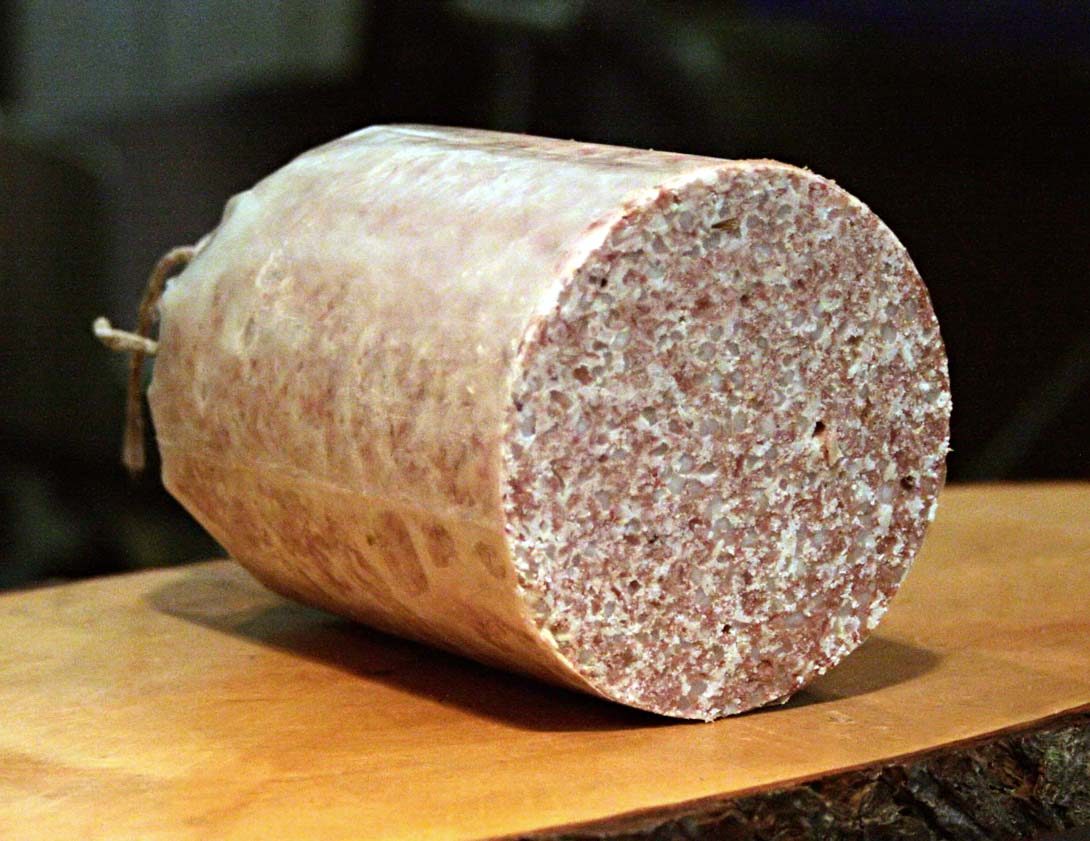
The shop version explains the name Wurstebrei.

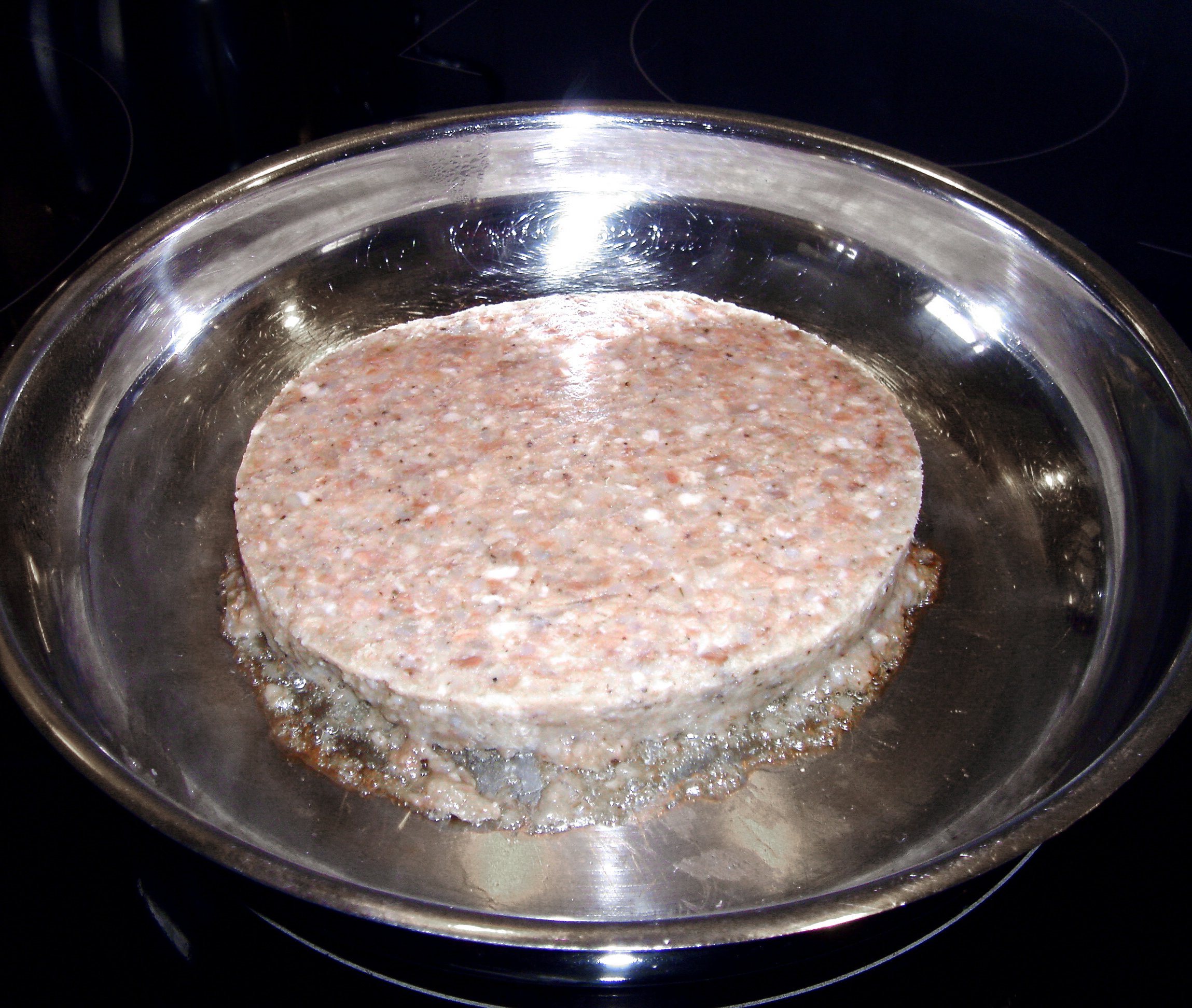
A slice of Stippgrütze is fried without fat.

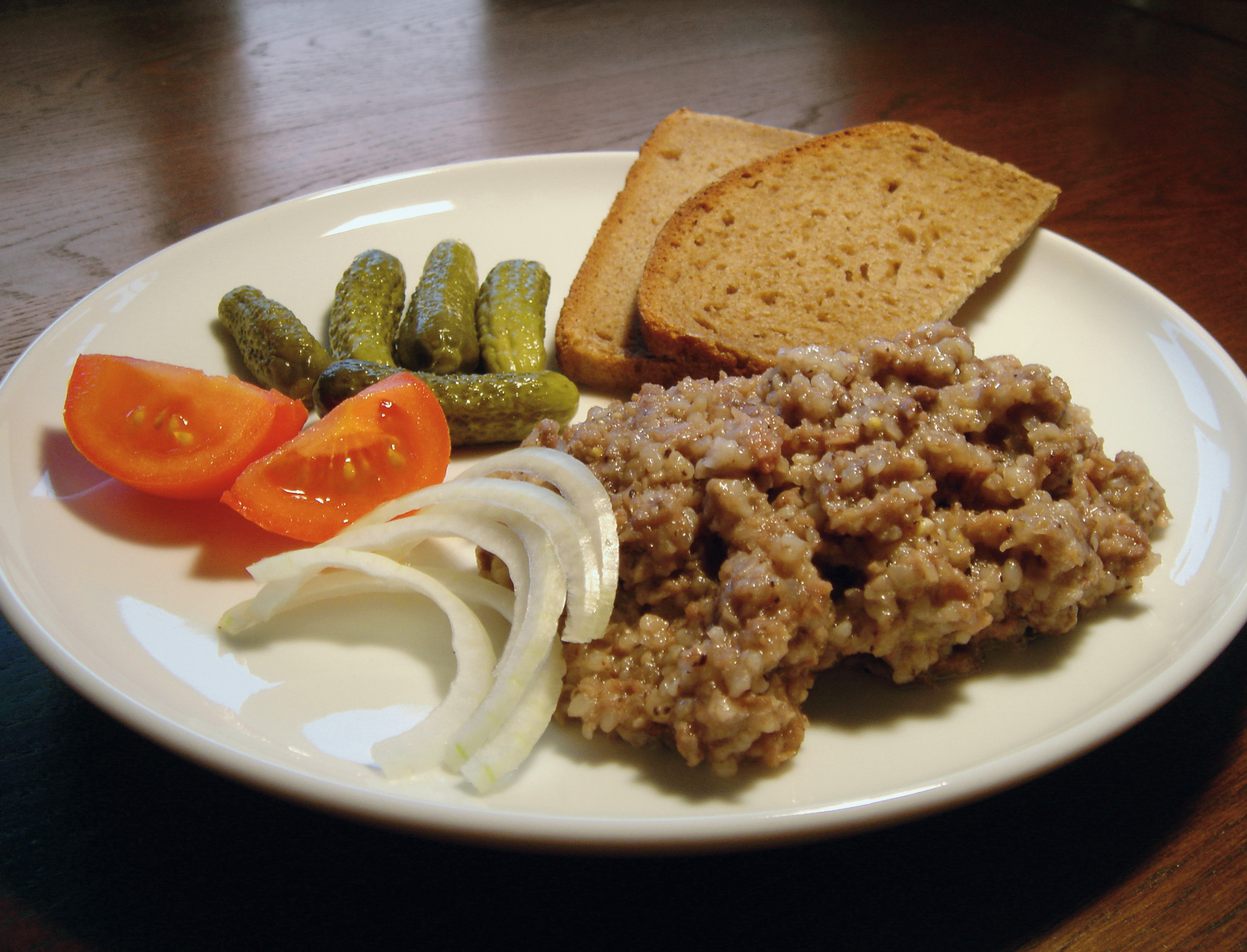
Stippgrütze freshly served

Stippgrütze, also called Wurstebrei, is a German dish from Westphalia which is similar to Grützwurst or Knipp. It consists of barley groats cooked in sausage juices (Wurstbrühe), which are enriched with pieces of meat, offal, such as heart, kidney or liver and seasoned with spices and salt. More rarely, finely chopped onions are added. The cooked ingredients are minced after the juices have been poured off and a crumbly cake is left which is held together with fat and which sets on cooling. There are various recipes, but they all contain barley groats, fat and meat.

A classic recipe contains pig offal or heart, belly pork with rind, lard greaves, barley groats, water, salt, pepper, allspice and thyme. The nutrition varies; one portion made from about 300 g of pork and 60 g of groats contains about 850 kJ.

Its relatively high fat content means that Stippgrütze keeps well and is often preserved or frozen, so that it can be used over the winter. The season for Stippgrütze begins with the traditional Schlachtfest or country feast in October or November, when the pigs are slaughtered, and lasts until spring.

In the shops Stippgrütze is usually sold in sausage form in clear artificial casings about 12 cm in diameter. To prepare it a large piece is fried in a pan without any additional fat, until a firm crust forms on the underside, occasionally it is stirred and fried again. A sort of porridge or puree (Brei) results, hence its other name of Wurstebrei (sausage puree).

Stippgrütze is served hot out of the pan and usually consumed at dinner (evening meal) together with or on top of coarse rye bread. For a main meal around midday salt or roast potatoes are usually served with it. It is common for a Stippgrütze meal to include a pickled gherkin. (Its acidity supports the digestion and palatability of this fatty meal.) Due to its high fat content Stippgrütze is also commonly eaten before enjoying alcoholic drinks.

The use of cooked offal together with coarsely-ground cereal exists in many cultures and used to be viewed as 'poor man's food'. Examples include the Scottish haggis prepared in a very similar way from oats and sheep's innards or the Swedish dish, Pölsa.
