= Weckewerk =

German sausage

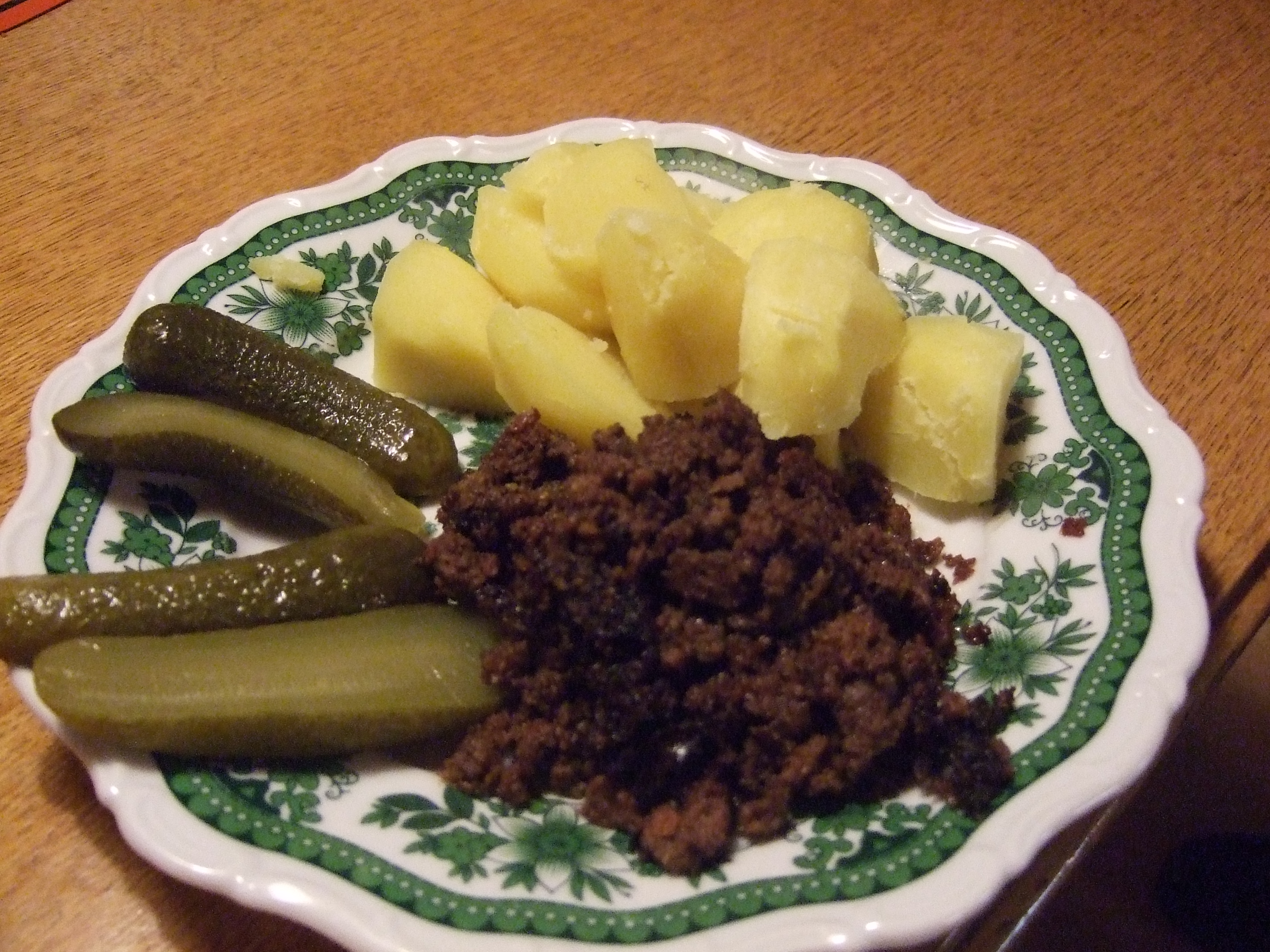
Weckewerk as part of a meal

Weckewerk is a sausage, native to Northern Hesse, Germany. It is made from cooked brawn and minced meat, veal or sausage, and broth of pork, sometimes from cooked meat, blood and offal. The sausage is stretched with stale bread, explaining the name: "Weck" or "Wegge" is the traditional term for roll in Northern Hesse. It is seasoned with onions, salt, pepper, marjoram, regionally also with caraway, allspice and garlic. The ingredients are ground and mixed. To be consumed within a short time, the mixture is packaged in pig intestines. If longer storage is desired, it is preserved in jars or filled in artificial casings.

Weckewerk, also called Weckewurst, can be eaten cold or fried in a pan. The former mayor of Kassel, Philipp Scheidemann, liked Weckewerk almost burnt, therefore this form of preparation is called Bürgermeisterart ("in the fashion of the mayor").

Common side dishes are boiled potatoes, leeks, black pudding, pickled cucumber, and beetroot or a green salad.
