= Black soup =

Ancient Spartan staple soup

- Type: Pork blood soup
- Region or state: Ancient Sparta
- Main ingredients: Pork, pork blood, salt, vinegar

Black soup or black broth (Ancient Greek: μέλας ζωμός, mélas zomós; also αἱματία, haimatía, or βαφά, bapha) was a type of blood soup in the cuisine of ancient Sparta, that was made with boiled pork meat and blood, using only salt and vinegar to flavour. The soup was well known during antiquity in the Greek world, but no original recipe of the dish survives today. The earliest recorded mention of the soup can be dated to the fifth century BC, in a comedy titled The Miners, written by Pherecrates. The ancient sources provide contradictory accounts on whether the soup was a luxurious meal served only at banquets or a dish that could be afforded by all Spartiates. Throughout history, black soup has been praised by and associated with figures such as Benjamin Rush and Adolf Hitler, although Hitler was (debatably) vegetarian.

== Etymology ==
The ancient Greek author, Plutarch, who wrote in the first and second century AD, mentioned a Spartan dish in his Life of Lycurgus named μέλας ζωμός, mélas zōmós. Today, the phrase has been translated to "black soup" or "black broth". In other ancient sources, this same dish was also known as αἱματία, haimatía, which means "blood soup", and βαφά, bapha, which can be translated as "dip sauce". Other times, this dish was simply referred to as ζωμός, zōmós.

In Ancient Greek, the term μέλας, mélas means black, while ζωμός, zōmós could refer to any soup cooked using animal products. The 1st-century AD medical writer Dioscurides recorded that there were many variations of zomós. For example, it could be cooked using frog, crayfish, rooster, beef, deer fat, and fish. The 5th–4th-century BC philosopher Plato also used the term zōmós when referring to a meat dish. Aristotle, writing around the 4th century BC, stated in his Historia Animalium that zōmós could be made using horse, pork, mutton, or goat. Contrarily, the ancient Greeks had another designated name for soups made primarily with vegetables, which was ἔτνος, étnos.

== Ancient sources ==
The majority of the ancient sources that describe black soup were written by non-Spartan authors. These authors include Pherecrates of the fifth century BC, Alexis and Matro of Pitane of the fourth and third century BC, Nicostratus of the fourth century BC, and Euphron of the third century BC. For example, in Pherecrates' comedy, The Miners, a woman returning from the underworld states that she saw black broth free-flowing through the streets. Antiphanes, a contemporary comedian of Alexis, had also noted that black soup was a staple of the Spartan culture in a play titled The Archon. A fragmentary anecdote indicates that Nicostratus once ridiculed a cook for not knowing how to prepare the Spartan black soup, along with other dishes such as "thríon" (θρῖον: stuffed leaves), "kándaulos" (κάνδαυλος: a Lydian dish), and "mattýe" (ματτύη: a type of dessert).

Other references to black soup are indirect. For example, in Aristophane's Knights, one of the lines in this comedy is "He has had tasty stews exported from Athens for the Spartan fleet." Although the reference is not explicit, the fifth century BC poet was suggesting that the Spartan version of stew was not as good as the stew cooked by the Athenians. Classics scholar David Harvey stated that the playwright was likely making fun of Spartan black broth in this passage.

Suda Lexicon, a Byzantine Greek historical encyclopedia compiled much later during the tenth century AD, states that zomós was a stock cooked using pig, cow, goat, sheep, or bear meat. Julius Pollux's lexicographic work, Onomasticon, notes that the black broth was a Spartan dish cooked with meat and blood.

== Origin ==
According to what Euphron (a third-century BC comedy poet) had written in one of his fragmentary (Note: A "fragmentary" text refers to a piece of writing of a certain ancient author that has been passed down to modern scholars through "indirect transmission." "Indirect transmission" refers to how fragmentary texts are often quotations from the lost works of a specific ancient author cited in the writings of other ancient authors.) comedies, titled The Brothers, a cook mentions that a man named Lamprias was responsible for inventing the Spartan black soup. However, this claim would be impossible to verify today.

== Ingredients ==
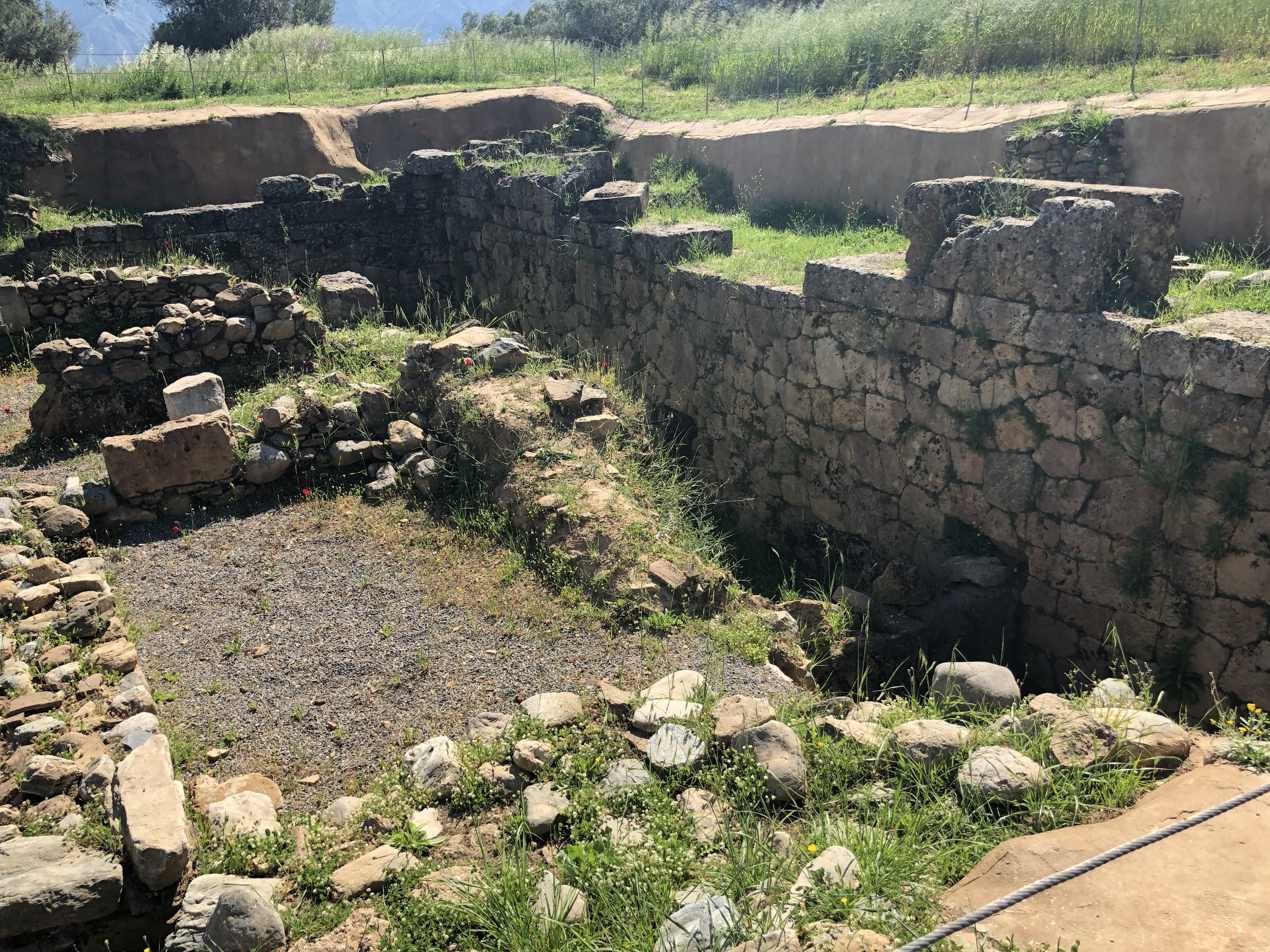
A photograph of the remains of ancient Sparta's agora. Xenophon has described this location as a bustling market during the Classical period, which is where the Spartans would also purchase the pigs for cooking black soup.

No recording of black soup's exact recipe exists today. Ancient literary sources, including historical, medical, and lexicographic, contain descriptions of black soup and its ingredients. Through interpreting these sources, it can be concluded that the Spartans cooked this dish using pig's blood and meat, with salt and vinegar as the only condiments. According to Plutarch's descriptions, the solid meat chunks in the soup were to be taken out and served separately to the younger attendees during banquets.

Plutarch is one of the ancient authors that alluded to this dish in his writings, such as in the Life of Lycurgus. In a passage explaining the Spartan society's dining and banqueting culture, Plutarch states that Sparta's most famous dish was black soup. The text also suggests that the elders would save the meat for the younger attendees, and they themselves would drink only the liquid. From Plutarch's account, "μέλας ζωμός" can be interpreted as a soup dish made primarily using meat.

In another work of Plutarch, De Tuenda Sanitate Praecepta, the author states that the Lacedaemonian (Spartan) cooks could only use vinegar and salt to prepare their food and were supposed to utilize all parts of a sacrificed animal. The historian Maciej Kokoszko theorized that Spartans did not use vinegar to marinate the meat. Instead, the vinegar was mixed with the animal's blood during cooking. As the vinegar was added to the blood, it would slow down the clotting process and prevent the blood from spoiling.

Dicaearchus, writing in the fourth and third centuries BC, stated that one of the dishes once served in Classical Sparta was a "ζωμός" made using boiled pork. The pork was paid for using the money collected from each member eating at the Spartan mess (syssitia) to purchase the pigs at the market. The mess (syssitia) was a membership-based institution that Spartan adults would join upon completing their military training and was essentially a dinner club where men would banquet together. According to Plutarch, each Spartan mess member's monthly contribution included different kinds of produce and cash. This money was specified as "ten Aiginetan obols." The sum collected would allow them to purchase up to a dozen piglets per month as the raw ingredients for cooking black soup. The German scholar, Link, has also theorized that black soup was the contribution made by the poor Spartans to the epaiklon, the extra voluntary donations of pre-prepared dishes and wheat bread.

The British Hellenistic scholar W. Geoffrey Arnott has also raised the speculation that Spartan black soup was meatless, made using a black variety of chickpea or Bengal gram, but this theory has been refuted by classicists such as Maciej Kokoszko.

== Occasions of consumption ==
How often the Spartans consumed black soup and whether it could be considered a delicacy are both debated questions in ancient sources. Seventh-century BC Spartan poet Alcman inferred that the food ordinary people in Sparta consumed was a pea soup, not the meat-based black soup. On this basis, the historian, Hans Van Wees, suggested that black soup could not be a dish that the average Spartans regularly consumed since it would entail the slaughtering of an animal. For example, it was during royal sacrifices that pigs were part of the offerings. There is also other contrary evidence suggesting that black soup was, in fact, a modest dish. In one of Matro of Pitane's poems, black soup appeared in the text alongside a dish named akrokólia (ἀκροκώλια). Akrokólia were boiled animal off-cuts, such as the skin, ears, and snouts, suggesting black soup belonged in the category of inexpensive dishes.

=== Banquets ===
According to Dicaearchus' Tripoliticus, in Classical Sparta, the dishes served for communal banquets were the máza and the following sides dishes: black soup, modest servings of boiled pork meat, olives, cheese, figs, and additional courses such as fish, hare, and pigeon. Spartans also consumed seasonal produce, such as birds and game. Modern scholars have interpreted máza as a type of barley bread, gruel, or flat griddle cake. The writings of Pherecrates and Alexis confirm that Spartans likely served black soup along with máza. Máza was a common food among the ancient Greeks, and the poor would consume it when they could not afford anything else. Because of its flat shape, máza could also be used as plates when no utensils were available. Based on Alexis and Plutarch's account, Maciej Kokoszko has inferred that both the black soup and máza were unsophisticated foods and were not delicacies.

During the Spartan banquets, the meal would end with dessert (ἐπαῖκλα). Plutarch asserts that Spartans also served wine at these banquets. One of the fragmentary poetries written by the poet, Alcman depicts that Sparta once had a luxurious feasting tradition. Plutarch's Life of Cleomenes provides a contradictory account, stating that the banqueting culture in Sparta was "unsophisticated" and Spartans served neither side dishes (karykeíai: καρυκείαι) nor baked goods. Herodotus' Histories contains a story of the Spartan general, Pausanias, ordering his servants to prepare him a Laconian (Spartan) dinner when visiting the lavish military camp of the Persian leader, Mardonius. This anecdote also suggests that the typical meals in Sparta were much less extravagant.

=== Religious celebrations ===
A scholia reference further implies that zomós was made using the leftovers from cooking the sacrificial meat during the Panathenaea celebrations. While the soup was served to the poor, the wealthier individuals could receive servings of the meat. Several ancient fragmentary poetries, including Philyllius' The Island Towns and Epilycus' Coraliscus, have noted that during the Cleaver festival (kopis), black soup was served at the temple of Apollo in Amyclae, a city located in Laconia that was at the time under Spartan control. The same sources also recorded that aside from the soup, barley cakes and wheat loaves would be served as well.

=== Military campaigns ===
There is no recording of the Spartans consuming black soup on military campaigns. The fifth century BC historian, Thucydides' account of the Spartan attack on Pylos in 425 BC includes a description of the Spartan army ration: ground corn, cheese, wine, and "any other food useful in a siege," which was not further specified in the passage. While Spartiate soldiers were typically well-nourished, there is no ancient literary evidence that suggests that black soup was part of their regular diet on military campaigns.

=== Domestic settings ===
Notably, the ancient sources do not provide accounts of whether black soup was cooked or served in domestic settings. The attendance of Spartan banquets was exclusive to male adult citizens. Therefore, there is no ancient recording of whether younger children or women in Sparta also had the chance of tasting and consuming the soup. Sparta's citizen class, known as Spartiates, was also restricted to approximately 6 percent of Spartan society, limiting the dish's potential range further.

== Notoriety ==
The Spartan black soup was known to the other Greeks during antiquity.

Plutarch mentions that one of the kings of Pontus had once purchased a Lacedaemonian cookbook to recreate this dish. After the king has stated his dislike of the dish, the cook responded that one could only appreciate this broth after having swum in the Eurotas River, a famous landmark located within Sparta, suggesting that one could not develop a palate for this particular dish unless raised in Spartan society. Plutarch probably recorded this account, drawing from the earlier writings of Xenophon. Cicero's Tusculan Disputations retells the same story, although the figure of the king of Pontus has changed to the Dionysios of Syracuse.

Plutarch also tells of an account of the Athenian general, Alcibiades attempting to fit into Spartan society by eating black soup when he fled to Sparta from Athens due to political pressure.

Plutarch's Life of Pelopidas has recorded that an inhabitant of Sybaris had once claimed, "it was no great thing for the Spartans to seek death in the wars in order to escape so many hardships and such a wretched life as theirs." Historians such as Maciej Kokoszko and Joan P. Alcock have interpreted this claim as supporting evidence of ancient Sparta's unbearable customs and food.

The broth's unique taste can be cross-referenced by a narration of how willing the Spartans were to share this dish with outsiders, as detailed in another work of Plutarch, the Life of Cleomenes. Cleomenes, a Spartan king who lived in the third century BC, once had a disagreement with his friend over serving the black soup to foreign visitors, who he argued could not appreciate the flavour. Maciej Kokoszko theorized that the Spartans were reluctant to introduce this dish to those who were not part of their community likely because the soup had a unique taste.

== Modern associations ==
As Spartan history gained popularity in the United States in the late 18th-century, Benjamin Rush, one of the signatories of the Declaration of Independence, is recorded to have praised the Spartan black broth.

Adolf Hitler, a vegetarian in his later years, was an admirer of aspects of the ancient Spartan society, and noted their fondness for black soup. He compared the broth to Schwarzsauer, a regional dish of the German state of Schleswig-Holstein. However, it was the example of Roman soldiers eating fruits and cereals and the importance of raw vegetables that he promoted. Shortly before World War II, a paper titled "Spartan Pimpfe" circulated in Germany. The essay claimed that Spartan youths would have black soup as lunch before attending sporting competitions.

W. Geoffrey Arnott, a British Hellenistic scholar, suggested that "the Gypsies still served this dish at fairs in northern England up to the 1940s."

== See also ==
- Ancient Greek cuisine
- Syssitia
- Dinuguan
- Schwarzsauer
- Blood sausage
- Laconophilia

== Bibliography ==
- Alcock, Joan P. Food in the Ancient World. London: Greenwood, 2006.
- Athenaeus. Deipnosophistae, translated by Charles Burton Gulick. Loeb Classical Library. 7 vols. London: William Heinemann, 1927-1941.
- Aristophanes. "Knights." In The Complete Greek Drama. Vol 2, edited by Eugene O'Neill, Jr. New York: Random House, 1938.
- Arnott, W. Geoffrey. Alexis: The Fragments: A Commentary. Cambridge: Cambridge University Press, 1996.
- Aristotle.The History of Animals, translated by D'Arcy Wentworth Thompson. Vol. 4 of The Works of Aristotle. Oxford: Oxford University Press, 1910.
- Boermans, Mary-Anne. "Black Broth." Deja Food. Last modified August 11, 2016.
- Berti, Monica. "Presenting Fragments as Quotations or Quotations as Fragments." Fragmentary Texts: Quotations and Text Re-uses of Lost Authors and Works. Last modified February 18, 2013.
- Cicero. Tusculan Disputations, translated by J. E. King. Loeb Classical Library 141. Cambridge, MA: Harvard University Press, 1927.
- Dalby, Andrew. Food in the Ancient World, From A to Z. London: Routledge, 2013.
- Fisher, N.R.E. “Drink, Hybris, and the Promotion of Harmony in Sparta.” In Classical Sparta: Techniques Behind Her Success, edited by Anton Powell, 26–50. London: Oklahoma University Press, 1988.
- Harvey, David. "Lacomica: Aristophanes and the Spartans." In Shadow of Sparta. Edited by Anton Powell and Stephen Hodkinson, 35–58. New York: Routledge, 1994.
- Herodotus. The Histories, translated by A. D. Godley. Cambridge: Harvard University Press, 1920.
- Hesychius. Hesychii Alexandrini Lexicon, edited by Kurt Latte, Peter Allan Hansen, and Ian C. Cunningham. Berlin: Walter de Gruyter, 2009.
- Hodkinson, Stephen. Property and Wealth in Classical Sparta. Swansea: The Classical Press of Wales, 2009. ISBN 978-1-910589-34-2. OCLC 864900188.
- Hodkinson, Stephen. "Sparta: An Exceptional Domination of State over Society?" In A Companion to Sparta, edited by Anton Powell, 4-29. Vol. 1 of A Companion to Sparta. Hoboken, NJ: Wiley Balckwell, 2018. ISBN 978-1-119-07238-6. OCLC 981761116.
- "How to Make or Cook the Original and Famous Ancient Spartan Black Soup in 7 Steps." Ancient Greece Reloaded. Last modified August 2, 2019.
- Julius Pollux. Vol 1, Pollucis Onomasticon e Codicibus ab Ipso Collatis Denuo. Teubner, 1900.
- Kock, Theodor. Comicorum Atticorum Fragmenta. Lipsiae: B.G. Teubner, 1880–1888.
- Kokoszko, Maciej. "Mélas Zomós (μέλας ζωμός), or on a Certain Spartan Dish. A Source Study." In Studies on Ancient Sparta, edited by Ryszard Kulesza, and Nicholas Sekunda. Akanthina, no. 14, edited by Nicholas Sekunda. Gdańsk: Gdańsk University Press, 2020. ISBN 978-83-7865-945-7. OCLC 1225234705.
- Koster, Willem J. W. Scolia in Aristophanem. Pars I Prolegomena de Comoedia, Scholia in Acharnenses, Equites et Nubes. Fasc. III 2 Continens Scholia Recentiora in Nubes. Groningen: Bouma's Boekhuis, 1974.
- Liddell, Henry George, Robert Scott, Henry Stuart Jones, Roderick McKenzie, and E. A. Barber. A Greek-English Lexicon. Oxford: Clarendon, 1968.
- "Melas Zomos: Spartan Black Stew." The Red Cellar. Last modified 27 November, 2020.
- Meineke, August. Fragmenta comicorum graecorum. Berolini: Typis impensis G. Reimeri, 1839–1857.
- Oxford Classical Dictionary, s.v. “Euphron.” Accessed March 26, 2021.
- Oxford Classical Dictionary, s.v. “Aristophanes(1).” Accessed April 3, 2021.
- Page, D. L., ed. Poetae Melici Graeci. Oxford: Clarendon Press; Toronto: Oxford University Press, 1962.
- “Pandora’s Stories: Black Broth.” LGS Greek Project. Last modified October 30, 2015.
- Pedanius Dioscorides. Pedanii Dioscuridis Anazarbei de Materia Medica Libri Quinque, edited by Max Wellmann. Berolini: Weidmann, 1914.
- Plato. "Lysis." In The Dialogues of Plato, translated by Benjamin Jowett. Chicago: Encyclopaedia Britannica, 1952.
- Plutarch. “Advice About Keeping Well.” In Moralia. Vol 2, How to Profit by One's Enemies. On Having Many Friends. Chance. Virtue and Vice. Letter of Condolence to Apollonius. Advice About Keeping Well. Advice to Bride and Groom. The Dinner of the Seven Wise Men. Superstition, translated by Frank Cole Babbitt. Loeb Classical Library 222. London: William Heinemann, 1928.
- Plutarch. “The Ancient Customs of the Spartans.” In Moralia. Vol 3, Sayings of Kings and Commanders. Sayings of Romans. Sayings of Spartans. The Ancient Customs of the Spartans. Sayings of Spartan Women. Bravery of Women, translated by Frank Cole Babbitt. Loeb Classical Library 245. London: William Heinemann, 1931.
- Plutarch. “The Life of Cleomenes.” In Plutarch’s The Parallel Lives. Vol 10, Agis and Cleomenes. Tiberius and Gaius Gracchus. Philopoemen and Flamininus, translated by Bernadotte Perrin. Loeb Classical Library 102. London: William Heinemann, 1921.
- Plutarch. “The Life of Lycurgus.” In Plutarch’s The Parallel Lives. Vol 1, Theseus and Romulus. Lycurgus and Numa. Solon and Publicola, translated by Bernadotte Perrin. Loeb Classical Library 46. London: William Heinemann, 1914.
- Plutarch. "The Life of Pelopidas." In Plutarch’s The Parallel Lives. Vol 5, Agesilaus and Pompey. Pelopidas and Marcellus, translated by Bernadotte Perrin. Loeb Classical Library 87. London: William Heinemann, 1917.
- Plutarch. "The Life of Alcibiades." In Plutarch’s The Parallel Lives. Vol 4, Alcibiades and Coriolanus. Lysander and Sulla, translated by Bernadotte Perrin. Loeb Classical Library 80. London: William Heinemann, 1916.
- Rawson, Elizabeth. The Spartan Tradition in European Thought. Oxford: Clarendon Press, 1991. ISBN 0-19-814350-8. OCLC 69198.
- Rebenich, Stefan. "Reception of Sparta in Germany and German-Speaking Europe." In A Companion to Sparta, edited by Anton Powell, 695–703. Vol. 2 of A Companion to Sparta. Hoboken, NJ: Wiley Balckwell, 2018. ISBN 978-1-119-07238-6. OCLC 981761116.
- Richard, Carl J. Greeks and Romans Bearing Gifts: How the Ancients Inspired the Founding Fathers. Lanham: Rowman & Littlefield, 2009. ISBN 9780742556249.
- Suda. Suidae Lexicon, edited by Ada Adler. Leipzig: Teubner, 1928–1938.
- Suda. "Suda On Line: Byzantine Lexicography," edited by David Whitehead, William Hutton, Catharine P. Roth, Patrick Rourke, and Elizabeth Vandiver, contributed by Ada Adler, Raphael A. Finkel, and Ross Scaife. Accessed April 3, 2021.
- "The Ancient Spartan Black Broth (Melas Zomos): How to Make the Famous Spartan Black Soup?" Greece High Definition. Last modified October 31, 2020.
- Thucydides. The Peloponnesian War. London, J. M. Dent; New York, E. P. Dutton, 1910.
- Van Wees, Hans. "Luxury, Austerity and Equality in Sparta." In A Companion to Sparta, edited by Anton Powell, 202–235. Vol. 1 of A Companion to Sparta. Hoboken, NJ: Wiley Balckwell, 2018. ISBN 978-1-119-07238-6. OCLC 981761116.
- Van Wees, Hans. "The Common Messes." In A Companion to Sparta, edited by Anton Powell, 236–268. Vol. 1 of A Companion to Sparta. Hoboken, NJ: Wiley Balckwell, 2018. ISBN 978-1-119-07238-6. OCLC 981761116.
- Wehrli, Fritz. Dikaiarchos. Basel: Schwabe, 1967.
- Wilkins, John. The Boastful Chef: The Discourse of Food in Ancient Greek Comedy. Oxford: Oxford University Press, 2001.
- Wilkins, John M., and Shaun Hill. Food in the Ancient World. Malden, MA: Blackwell Publishing, 2006.
- Xenophon. "Constitution of the Lacedaimonians." In Xenophon in Seven Volumes. Vol 7, Scripta minora. Pseudo-Xenophon. Constitution of the Athenians, translated by E. C. Marchant, and G. W. Bowersock. Loeb Classical Library. London: William Heinemann, 1925.
- Xenophon. Hellenica. Vol 1, Books 1-4, translated by Carleton L. Brownson. Loeb Classical Library 88. Cambridge, MA: Harvard University Press, 1918.
