= Blood soup =

Soup that uses blood as a principal ingredient

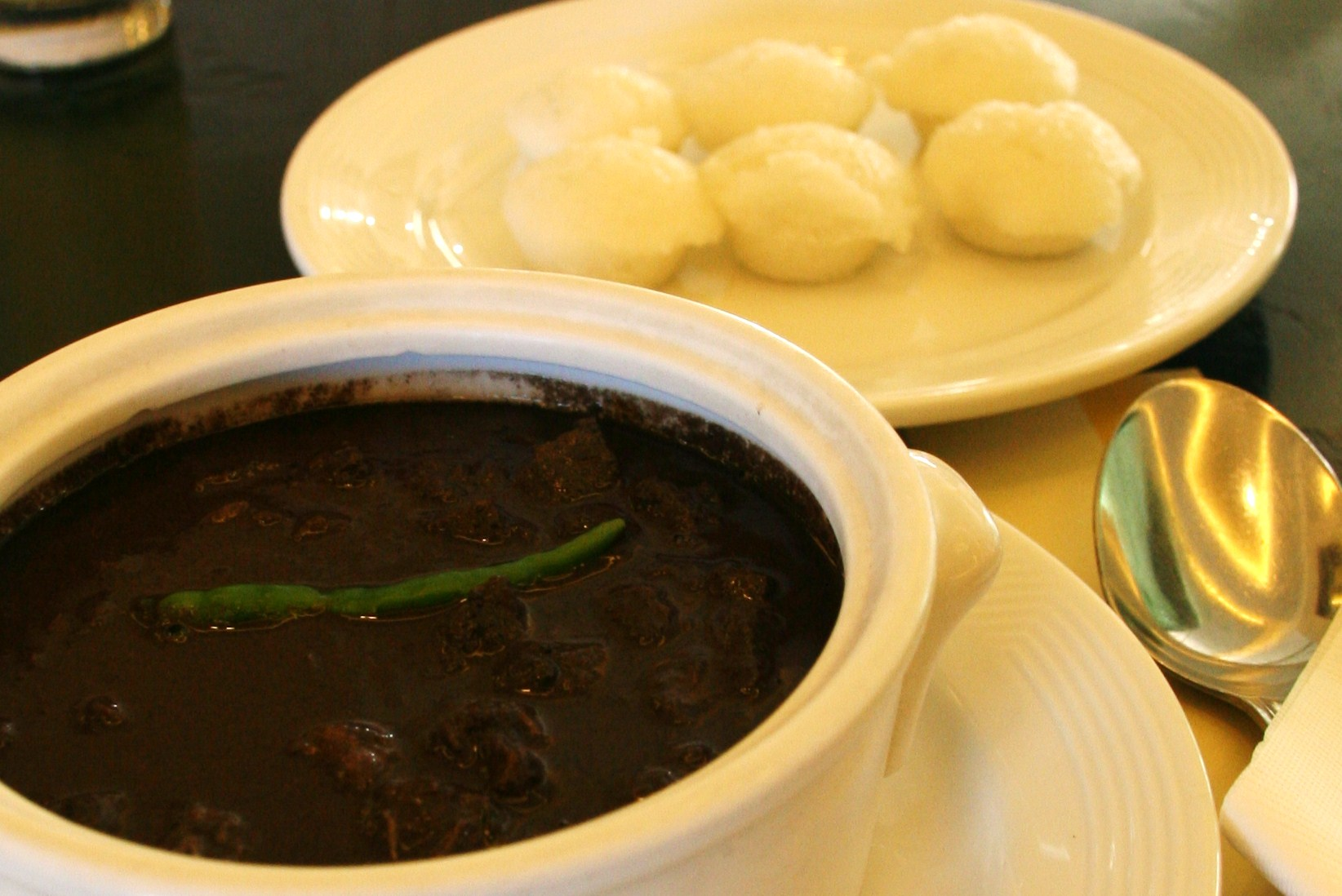
- Dinuguan, a blood soup from the Philippines
- Type: Soup
- Main ingredients: Blood

Blood soup is any soup that uses blood as a principal ingredient.

== List of blood soups ==
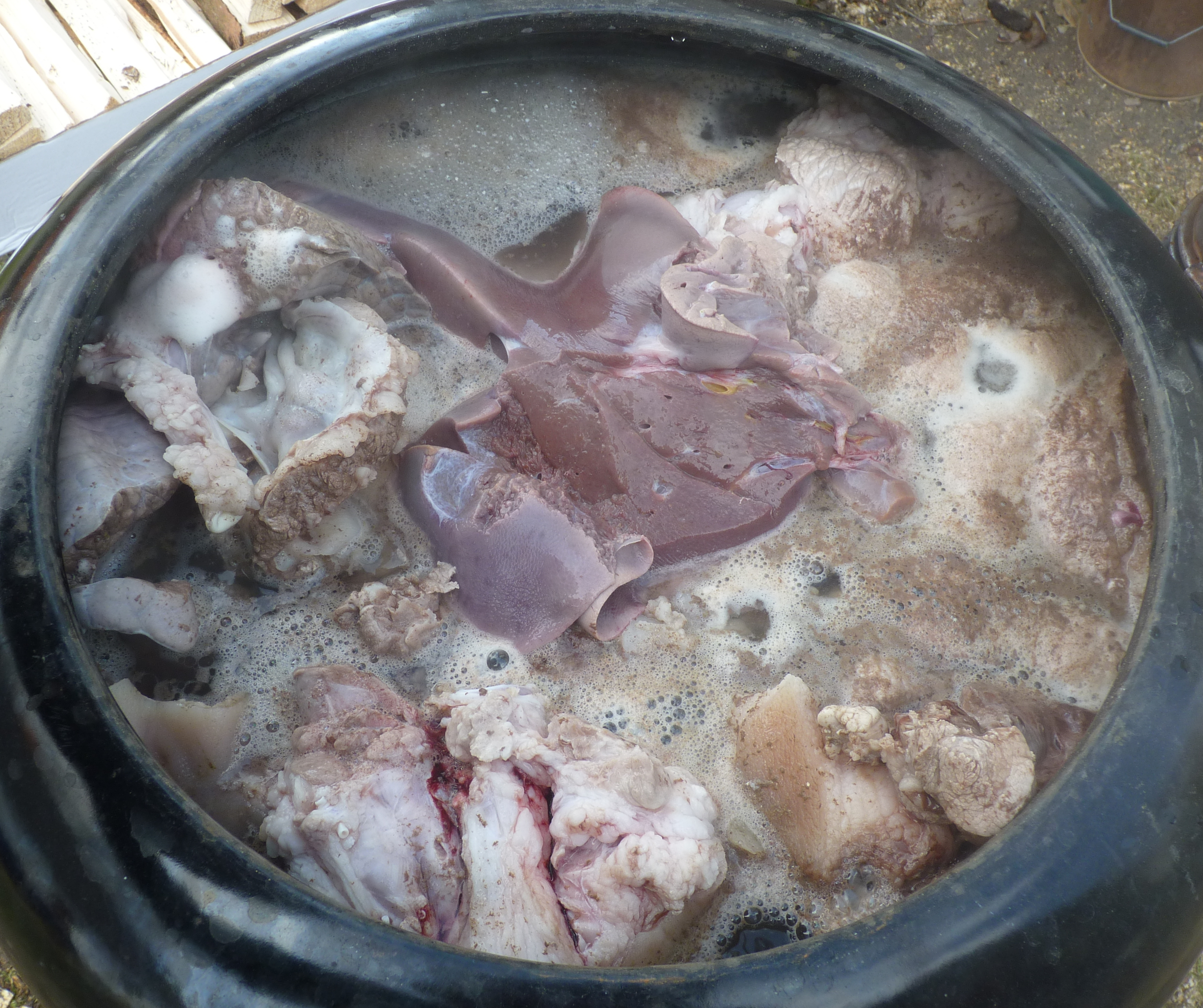
Prdelačka

Examples of blood stew include:

- Black soup, a historical pork-blood soup of Ancient Greek cuisine particularly associated with ancient Sparta.
- Chicken and duck blood soup, a blood soup popular in Shanghai
- Chornaja Poliwka, Belarusian soup made of duck, goose or pig blood and clear broth
- Czernina, or Duck Blood Soup, a Polish soup made of duck, goose or pig blood and clear broth
- Dinuguan, a soup from the Philippines made of pig blood and pork offal or meat
- Duck blood and vermicelli soup, a traditional delicacy in Nanjing
- Fritada, a special type of dish cooked with goat (cabrito) blood, prepared in Northern Mexico, and a regional specialty in the city of Monterrey.
- Godlja, a traditional Slovenian blood soup
- Juka, a Lithuanian blood soup from the Dzūkija region
- Mykyrokka, a traditional soup dish in Middle-Finland
- Prdelačka, a traditional Czech pork blood soup made during the pig slaughter season
- Saksang, a savory spicy dish from the Bataks of Indonesia made with pork or dog meat stewed in blood with coconut milk and spices
- Schwarzsauer, a German blood soup with various spices cooked in vinegar-water and a sort of black pudding made with vinegar
- Seonjiguk, a Korean soup made with thick slices of congealed ox blood and vegetables in a hearty beef broth, known as a hangover cure
- Svartsoppa, a soup consumed in Scania with goose blood (or sometimes pig blood) as the main ingredient
- Tiết canh, a Vietnamese duck blood soup
- Yawarlukru, An Ecuadorian speciality from the highlands region

== See also ==
- Black pudding
- Coq au vin
- List of soups
