= Argentine tea culture =

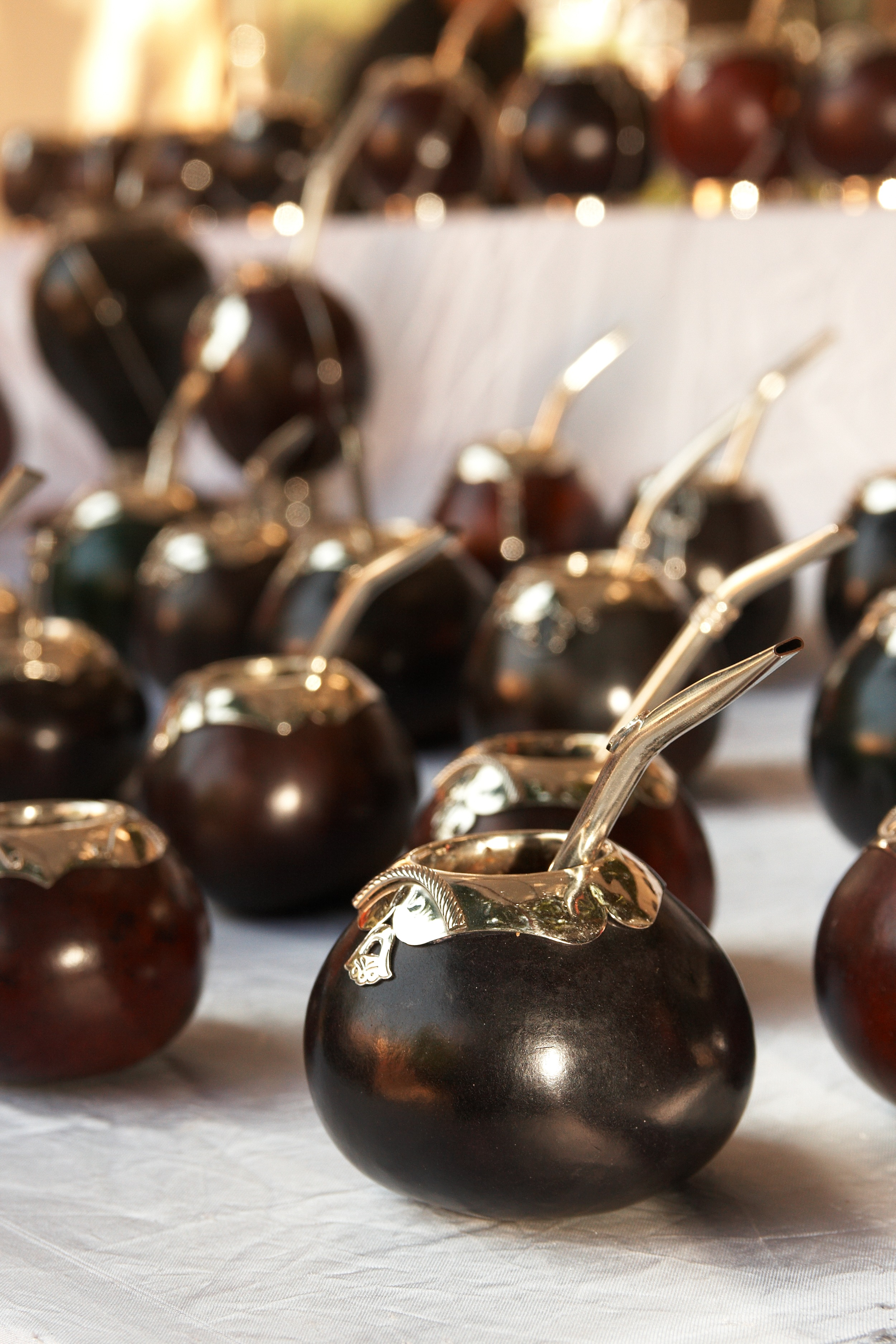
Mate tea served in traditional gourd cups in Argentina.

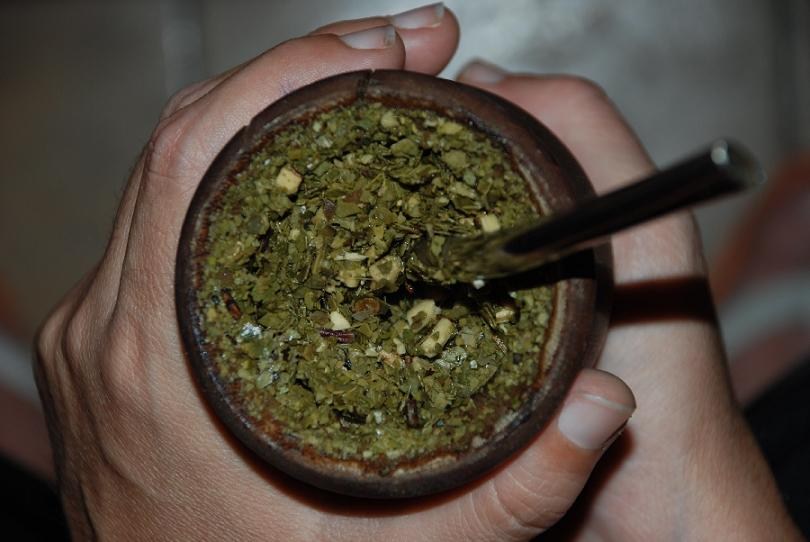
A cup of freshly made mate.

The Argentine tea culture is influenced by local and imported varieties and customs. The country is a major producer of tea (Camellia sinensis), but is best known for the cultivation and consumption of mate, made with the leaves of the local yerba mate plant.

== History ==
When Jesuit missionaries first came to Argentina, they tried to ban the popular indigenous tea, yerba mate, out of concern about its addictive qualities. They ultimately reversed their stance and began cultivating yerba mate on plantations in the Misiones province in particular (and elsewhere in South America), until the expulsion of the religious order from the Americas in 1767 during the Suppression of the Society of Jesus.

The first varieties of non-native tea to be grown in colonial Argentina were introduced from Russia in 1920. Beginning in 1924, the Argentine government urged farmers to experiment by planting tea seeds that the government imported from China and then distributed to interested farmers. Farmers tested the cultivation of this tea in the provinces of Misiones, Corrientes, Formosa, Chaco and Tucuman. Immigrant farmers also experimented with planting imported tea on their land. Low prices for tea on the world market dampened farmers' enthusiasm for imported tea crops, however. This tea was also considered inferior to foreign teas. Therefore, domestic production was small prior to 1951, when Argentina's government imposed a ban on imported tea. Tea remained a popular beverage, so the demand led to increased cultivation of local tea. In 1952, new tea plantations were established in Misiones Province in northeastern Argentina, growing a better quality tea than had been cultivated previously. Increased demand for tea led in turn to more farmers cultivating it . Argentina has expanded its export market over the decades, reaching its current status as the ninth largest tea-producer worldwide.

== Tea production ==
Argentina is an important tea-producing nation, the world's ninth-largest tea producer as of 2005 with an estimated annual production of 64,000 metric tons.

The Argentine regions with the largest concentration of tea cultivation are the highlands of the Misiones and Corrientes provinces in northeastern Argentina, where the climate is hot and humid. The major plantations are on relatively flat land where highly mechanized production can occur. The growing season for tea is from November to May. The teas from Argentina today are some of the least expensive in the world and they are mainly used for processing into ready-to-drink (RTD) and iced tea, given their deep color and brisk taste.

Tea exports from Argentina total about 50 million kilograms annually. Argentine tea is primarily used for blending. The largest export market is the United States, where the majority of consumption is for iced tea. The United Kingdom and other parts of Europe also are markets for the country's tea. Although Argentina is responsible for majority of the nations tea production for export across the globe, only about 5 percent of the production is consumed locally. The 78,000 mt (metric tons) that was exported in 2015 represents 4 percent of the total world tea exports and they go to a well diversified range of customers with the main buyer being the US, which purchased 55,300 mt of tea from Argentina in 2015. The tea production as well as trade, in Argentina is only expected to increase from now into the future, as the nation is becoming more aware of the developing tea business.

== Yerba mate ==
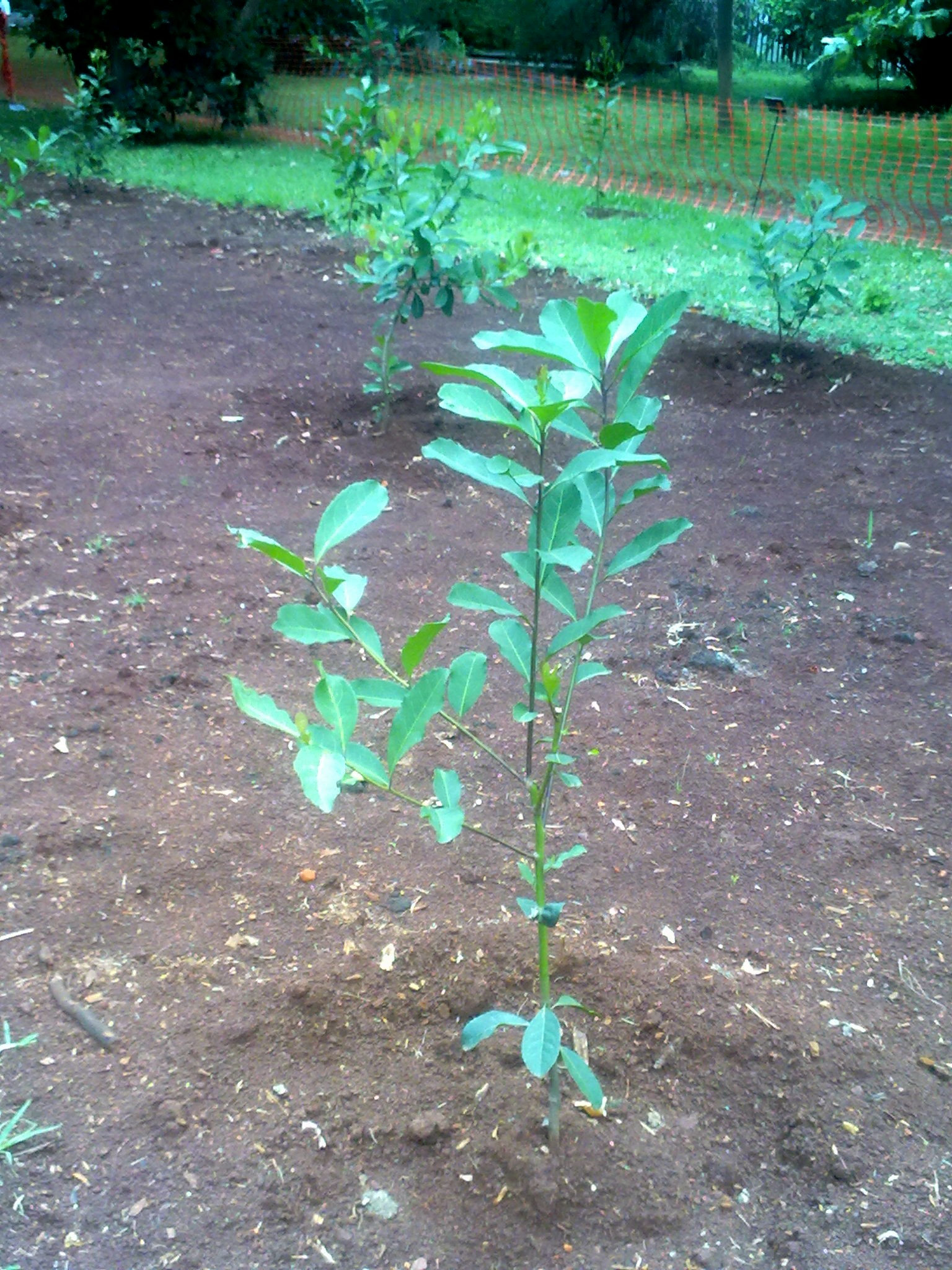
A yerba mate plant in the Botanical Garden of Buenos Aires, Argentina.

Mate is a tisane, or herbal tea, that is popular in Argentina as well as in Brazil, Paraguay and Uruguay. Mate is the Quechuan word for "gourd". Mate is served in a hollow gourd (or occasionally a horn or a hoof), and drunk through a metal straw called a bombilla. This serving style originated with a native culture, the Guarani. The Guarani called the yerba mate plant Caa'. Indigenous peoples made bombilla straws from hollow cane, and made a filter at the end with vegetable fibers; today's bombilla straws, although made of metal, retain the filter feature at the end that is submerged in the gourd.

An elaborate ritual exists for sharing mate:

The cebador [server] pours water slowly as he or she fills the gourd. The gourd then passes clockwise, and this order, once established, continues. A good cebador will keep the mate going without changing the yerba for some time. Each participant drinks the gourd dry each time.

The French Society of Hygiene explained yerba mate by saying, "Yerba Mate raises morale, sustains the muscular system augments strength and allows one to endure privations. In a word, it is a valiant aid." Considered to have medicinal properties by the indigenous South Americans, Mate has a range of active compounds. It has antioxidant and cholesterol-lowering properties, and contains vitamins C, B1, and B2. Colonists and other outsiders observed that gauchos of Argentina and adjoining countries subsisted on a diet of little more than meat and mate without developing scurvy. Mate developed a reputation as a healthy beverage that helped spread its popularity. Mate drinking is widespread in Argentina today. Every year, Argentines consume an average of 5 kg of mate per person. It is a popular morning beverage, due to its high caffeine content. Mate tea served in a traditional gourd cup should never be stirred with the straw; doing so is considered poor etiquette in Argentine tea culture. It is also considered poor manners to wipe the bombilla when sharing mate.

Alternative styles of mate are also popular in Argentina. The beverage called mate cocido is simply yerba mate brewed in a tea bag, similar to Asian style tea, and served with milk or sugar. Mate cocido is a less bitter variation on the traditional mate drink. Orange peels and hot milk added to the yerba mate create a beverage called mate de leche con cascarita de naranja.

A museum dedicated to the history of yerba mate is located in Tigre, near Buenos Aires.

== Tea-drinking customs and establishments ==
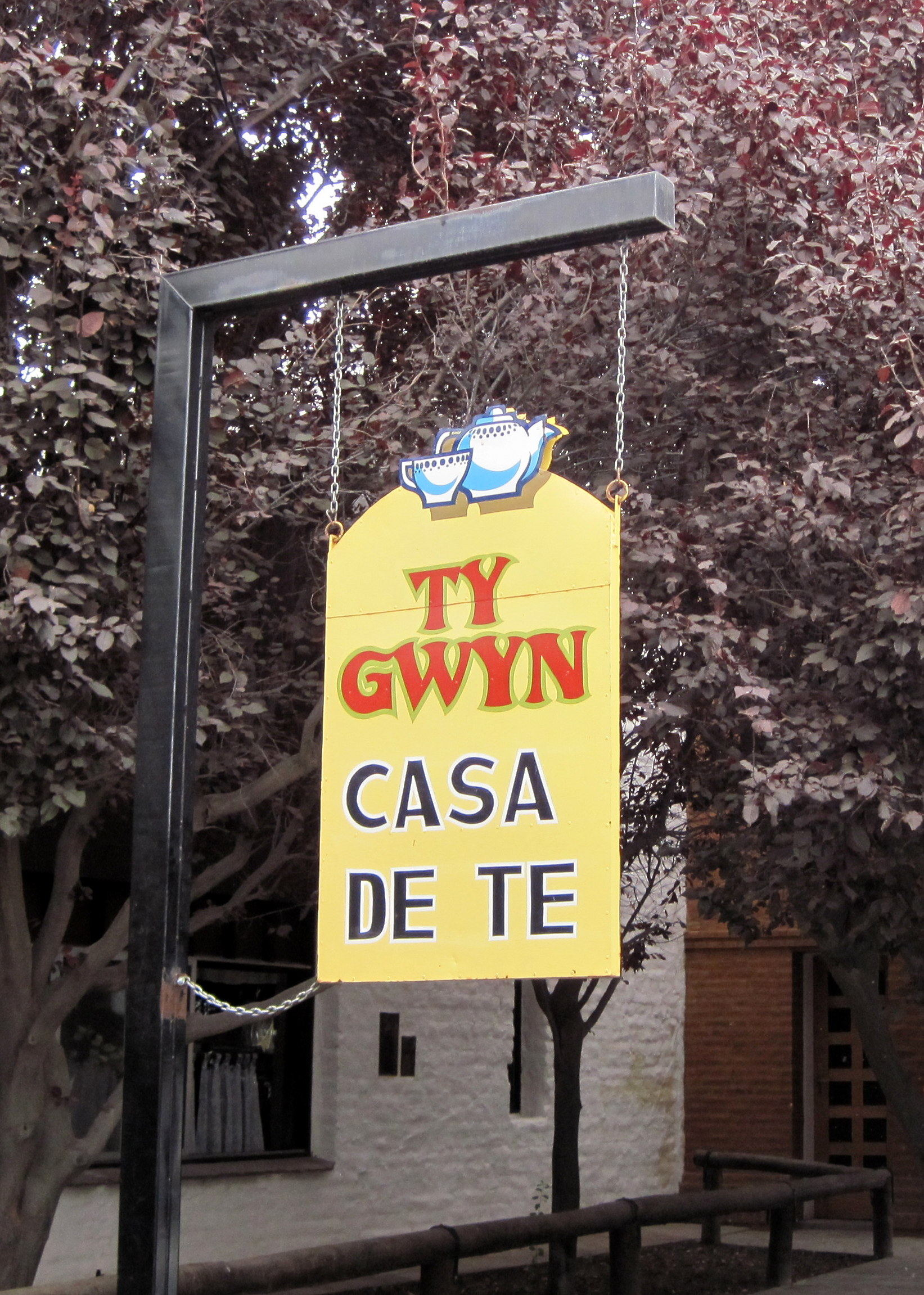
A Welsh tea house in Gaiman, Chubut

The southernmost region of Argentina, Patagonia, and the town of Gaiman in particular, are known for several traditional Welsh tea houses popular with tourists. The tea houses were established by Welsh people who emigrated to Argentina seeking cultural freedom during a time in the 19th century when the Welsh language was suppressed in Great Britain. The Welsh tea customs are similar to those practised throughout Great Britain and Ireland, with tea being served at approximately 4:00 p.m., the tea beverage being mixed with milk and sugar and consumed alongside cakes and pastries, the most popular of which being the 'torta negra galesa', or Welsh black cake. The interior of the tea houses are decorated with family heirlooms and ornamental kitchenware that bear Welsh names and writings in order to increase authenticity, as well as a gift shop for tourists. While inside, traditional Welsh music is typically played in the background, and larger groups of visitors may be treated to a live Welsh choral singing performance.

A combination of British tea culture and Argentine cuisine can be found in some establishments in Buenos Aires, where tea is served in the late afternoon following the British custom. Traditional British tea varieties such as Earl Grey are served with scones, tarts and finger sandwiches, or the customer's selection from a tea menu of Argentine dishes such as asado de tira (beef ribs). Other options include tereré, an infusion of mate made with cold water instead of warm, and locro, a thick bean stew.

Young Argentines' tastes in tea beverages are increasingly influenced by global retail trends. Argentine consumers can purchase Moroccan mint tea or Chinese green tea as well as more traditional varieties. In a concession to Argentine tea culture, when Starbucks opened its first outlet in Argentina, it announced that it would include a mate latte drink on its menu.

== See also ==
- Mate (drink)
