= Juka =

Juka can refer to:

== People ==
- Xhelal Juka (1926–2012), Albanian footballer
- Ivona Juka Croatian and Montenegrin film director
- Juka Fukumura (福村 寿華; born 1996), Japanese competitor
- Juka, a nickname of Bosnian gangster and warlord Jusuf Prazina
- Juka, the Japanese musician now known as Shaura

== Games ==
- Juka and the Monophonic Menace an action-adventure video game

== Others ==
- Juka (soup), a blood-based Lithuanian dish
- Juka, an acrobatic aircraft manufactured by Jurgis Kairys
