= Duck blood and vermicelli soup =

Traditional delicacy of Nanjing, China

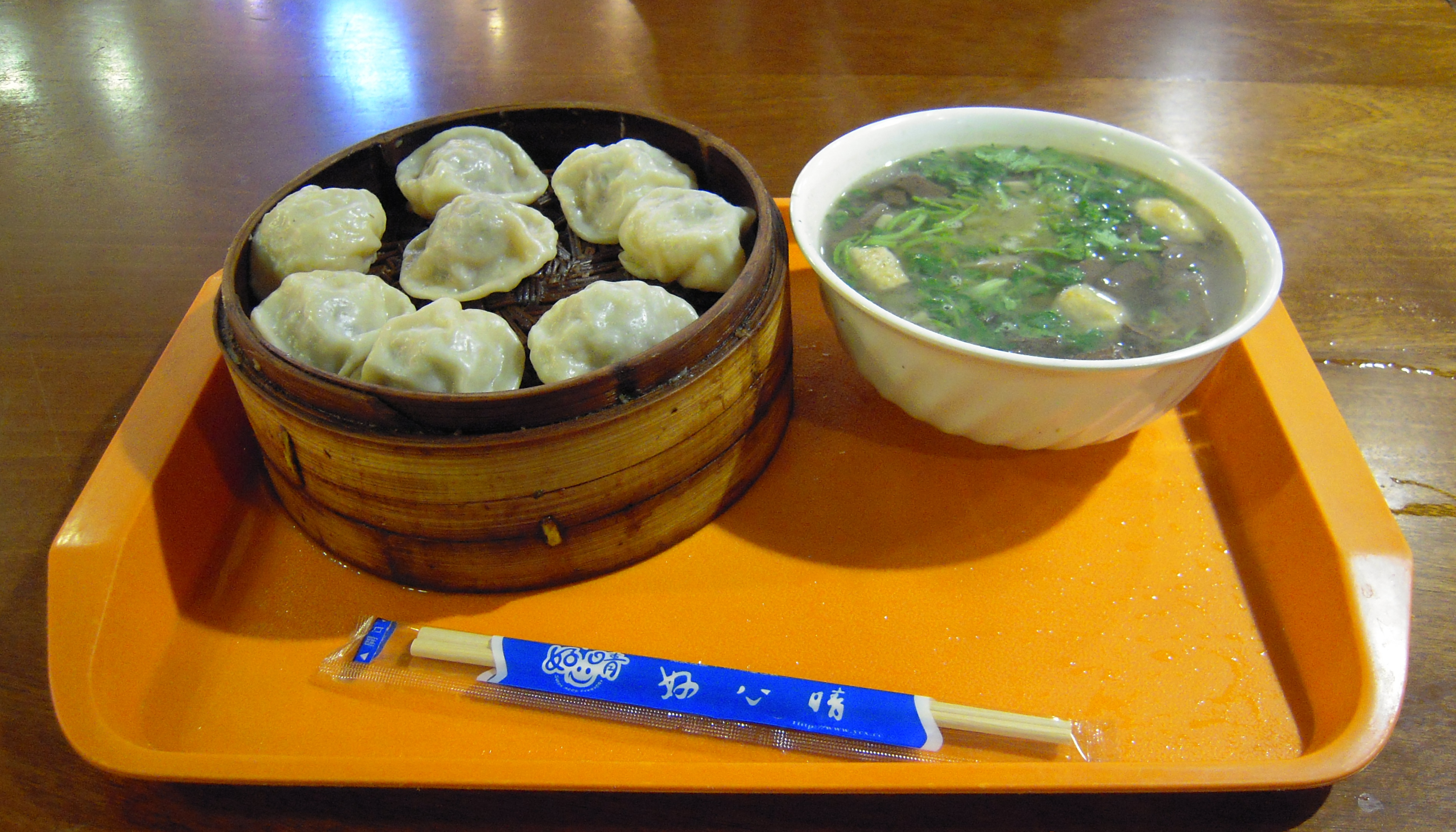
- Xiaolongbao and duck blood and vermicelli soup
- Alternative names: 鸭血粉丝汤
- Place of origin: China
- Region or state: Nanjing
- Main ingredients: Duck blood, Chinese vermicelli

Duck blood and vermicelli soup (Chinese: 鸭血粉丝汤) is a traditional delicacy of Nanjing, capital of Jiangsu province, and is also eaten in other regions of China. A similar dish is eaten in Poland, Belarus, and Lithuania, where it is called czernina.

== Legend ==
Duck blood and vermicelli soup is a traditional delicacy in Nanjing. It is said that once there was a poor man in Nanjing. He killed a duck and used a bowl to hold the duck's blood, but accidentally dropped some vermicelli into the bowl. He cooked them together and surprisingly found that the soup was delicious. A rich man heard the story and employed the poor man to cook the dish for his family.

== Ingredients ==
Duck blood, vermicelli, dried fried tofu, dried small shrimp, duck gizzards, duck intestines, duck livers, scallion, and coriander are used to make the soup. Chili oil and vinegar are sometimes added to the soup base in Nanjing.

Authentic duck blood and vermicelli soup is cooked with more than twenty Chinese herbal medicines. Some of those who prepare it this way believe that these ingredients promote blood circulation, remove toxins and maintain beauty, as well as aiding digestion and warming the stomach.

The main ingredient, vermicelli, is made of sweet potato. It is smooth, soft, and waxy. Other ingredients are duck blood, dried fried tofu, dried small shrimp, duck gizzards, duck intestines, and duck livers. Salt, shallots, gingers, sesame oil and caraway are common seasonings.

== See also ==
- Blood soup
- Chicken and duck blood soup
- Czernina
- Jiangsu cuisine
- List of Chinese soups
- List of duck dishes
- List of soups
