= Locro =

Type of squash or potato stew

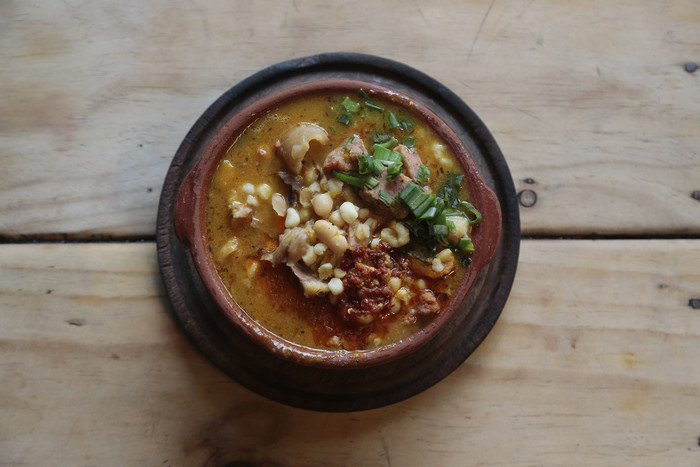
- Typical Argentine locro
- Type: Stew
- Place of origin: Andean civilization
- Region or state: South America
- Associated cuisine: Peruvian, Bolivian, Ecuadorian, Argentinian, Paraguayan, Chilean, Colombian
- Serving temperature: Hot
- Main ingredients: Squash, corn, papa chola potatoes, sometimes meat (usually beef, sometimes beef jerky or chorizo), vegetables, hot sauce (cayenne pepper, paprika)

Locro or lojro (from the Quechua ruqru) is a hearty thick squash or potato stew, associated with Native Andean civilizations, and popular along the Andes mountain range. It is one of the national dishes of Peru, Bolivia, Ecuador, Chile, Paraguay, Argentina and Southwestern Colombia. Locro is among the most important main foods representing Argentinan gastronomy, ranking as third among 28 different foods in a study regarding traditional Argentinan gastronomy.

== History ==
The background of Locro dates back to the time of the Inca Empire, but due to the lack of manuscripts from said time period, much information stems from hearsay and indirect accounts provided by Spanish contemporary witnesses. The first version of Locro was made of potatoes, chili peppers, salt, water and Chuño, which allowed the populations to subsist despite their otherwise low-protein-containing diet.

== Composition ==
The dish is a classic squash, hominy, beans, and potato or pumpkin soup well known along the South American Andes. In some regions, locro is made using a specific kind of potato called papa chola, which has a unique taste and is difficult to find outside of its home region.

The defining ingredients are squash, corn, some form of meat (usually beef, but sometimes beef jerky or chorizo), and vegetables. Other ingredients vary widely and typically include onions, beans, squash, or pumpkin. It is mainly eaten in winter.

In Ecuador, a variant known as yahuarlocro is popular. It incorporates lamb entrails and lamb blood into the recipe.

In Peru, locro is a rather thick stew with macre pumpkin as the main ingredient. It includes potatoes, corn, chili, onions, cheese and green peas. It is usually served with white rice and occasionally with some kind of meat, but is traditionally a vegetarian dish.

In Argentina its consumption has spread from the Northwest and Cuyo to the rest of the country. In the Argentine province of Neuquén, in addition to locro made with corn, a kind of locro is prepared with peas, and in the Northeast of Argentina locro is also prepared on the basis of cassava.

Although the Argentine locro has Indo-American origins, its preparation in Argentina for at least three centuries synthesizes the European gastronomic contributions: for example, pork, chorizos, tripe and numerous seasonings have been contributed by the Europeans (especially by the Spanish).

There are several classic types of locro: corn, beans, cassava and wheat, although an expert cook can make an excellent synthesis of two or more of these types of locro to include all the ingredients.

Thus, the Argentine locro is prepared according to a multitude of recipes, the only invariable thing being its vegetable base and the cooking procedure, over low heat for several hours. According to the region, it is prepared with fresh or dried beef jerky (charqui), offal (such as intestines, tripe, ribs, trotters, tail, ears and hide), sausages, pork ribs and bacon; the meats are cooked separately and then added to the preparation of vegetables, among which pumpkin usually stands out (especially the round, gray kind known as zapallo plomo), which usually gives its yellow color to the locro, and white corn grains, beans and even wheat grains. In Argentina locro with white corn is preferred. Locro based on crushed corn grains is called frangollo, with vegetables which, due to starch, make the preparation reach the density of a cream. It is a hearty and nutritious dish typical of winter. It is seasoned accordingly, with a spicy sauce prepared with oil (or fat), ground chili, paprika, green onion and salt, called quiquirimichi.

The succulent locro (dense and with varied and abundant ingredients) usually receives the name of locro pulsudo; on the other hand, it is called huaschalocro, 'poor locro' without meat or huascha locro (from Quechua wakcha luqru), to the "light" locro prepared with the minimum of ingredients and with a thick sticky consistency. A gastronomic variety close to huaschalocro is mote.

It is also called pulsudo in Argentina to the locro that besides being substantial and full of calories is very spicy, like the locro with cumbarí bell pepper as it happens in certain zones of the Argentine Northwest and especially in certain zones of the Argentine province of La Rioja.

Locro casserole is food with many calories and nutrients and is very suitable for consumption during winters or in cold areas. It is traditionally consumed on a massive scale on May 1 and May 25, the day that commemorates the May Revolution and the formation of the first Argentine patriotic government, which was established on May 25, 1810. For this reason, it has gone from being a regional and traditional dish to being one of Argentina's national dishes to celebrate patriotic dates: on the two Argentine patriotic dates – May 25, date of the de facto or concrete independence of Argentina since 1810, and July 9, the date on which, in 1816 in San Miguel de Tucumán, Argentina's independence was explicitly proclaimed. The breakfast of chocolate infusions with milk and pastries given in schools on May 25 and July 9 is usually traditional, as opposed to the also traditional mate cocido, which is usually given during most of each year in public schools, military barracks and regiments, etc., accompanied by pastelitos criollos. Eventually, there is the custom of inviting guests with small casseroles of locro at wedding celebrations.

On cold days, locro is often consumed with red wine such as Argentine malbec, whereas on warm days, an Argentine torrontés white wine, which is described as fresh and fruity honeyed, is often preferred.

According to authors such as Victor Ego Ducrot, the Argentine locro became one of the Argentine national dishes during the Argentine War of Independence, and especially in the Gaucho War, when the gauchos who had fought in the ranks of the Army of the North then spread the typical stew of the Argentine Northwest in Argentina pampeana, litoral, cuyana, etcetera; on the anniversary of the Revolution of May, that is to say on May 25, 1910, practically (although no legislation is known in this respect) locro was made official as national food on the two main patriotic dates.

== Gallery ==
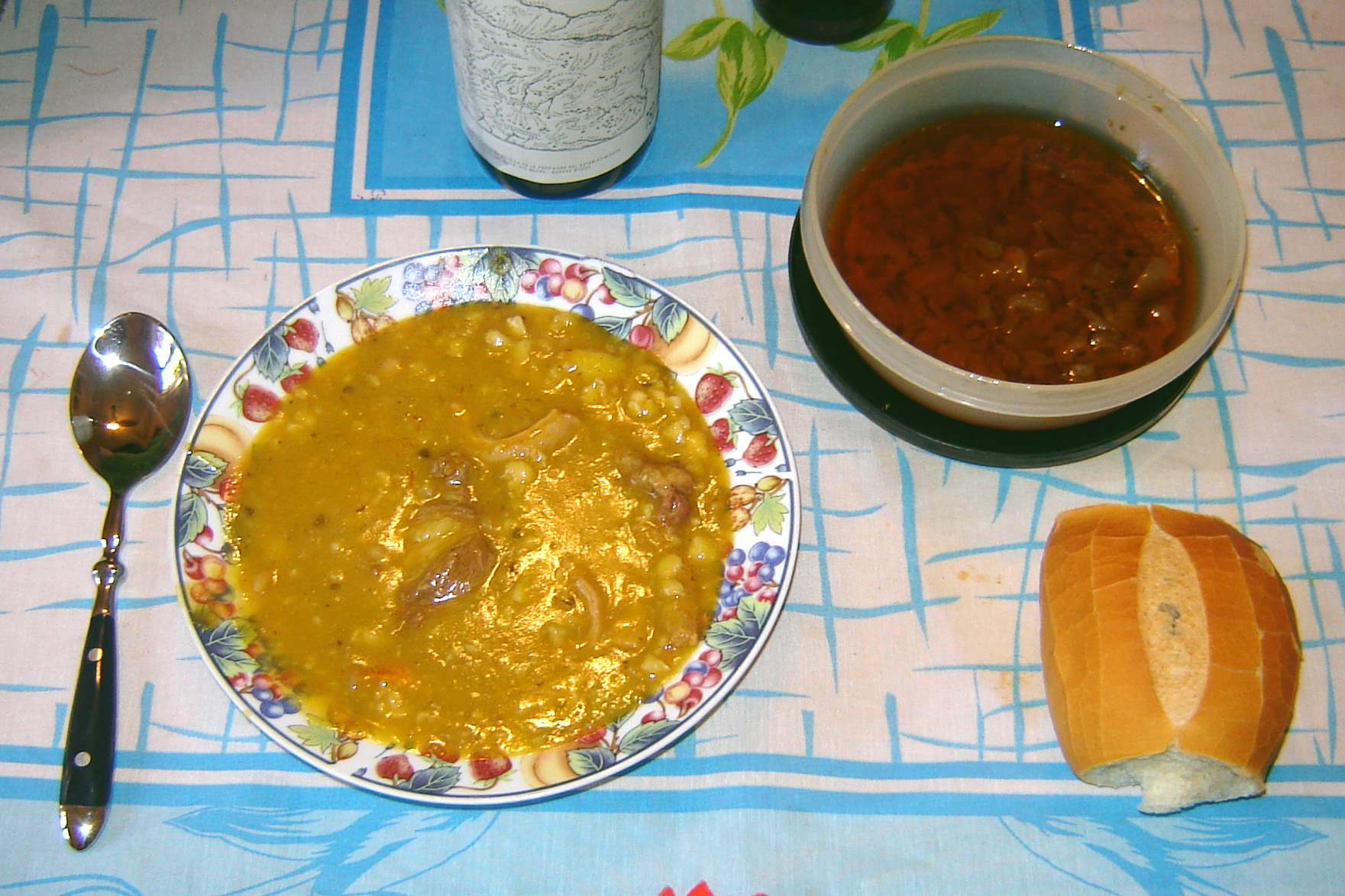
Locro at the table, with quiquirimichi and bread.

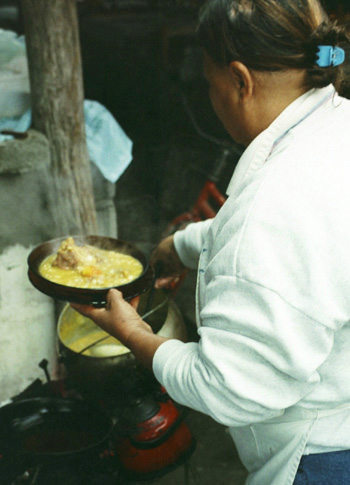
Locro being served at Simoca market, Argentina

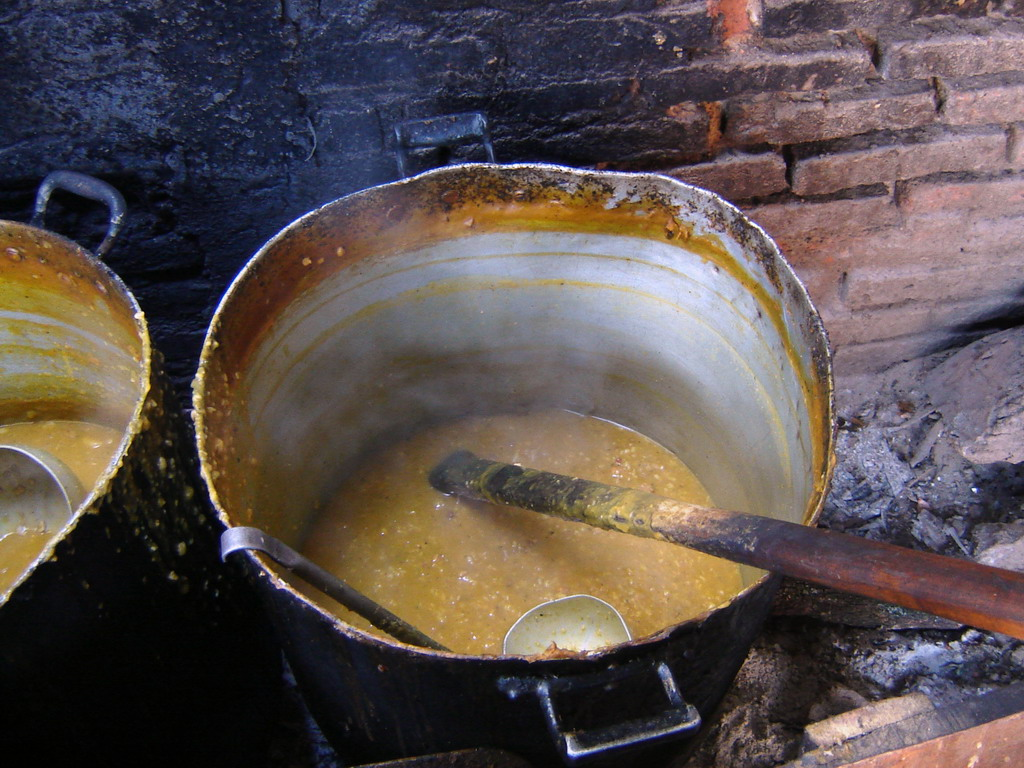
Big pots of locro cooked on coal

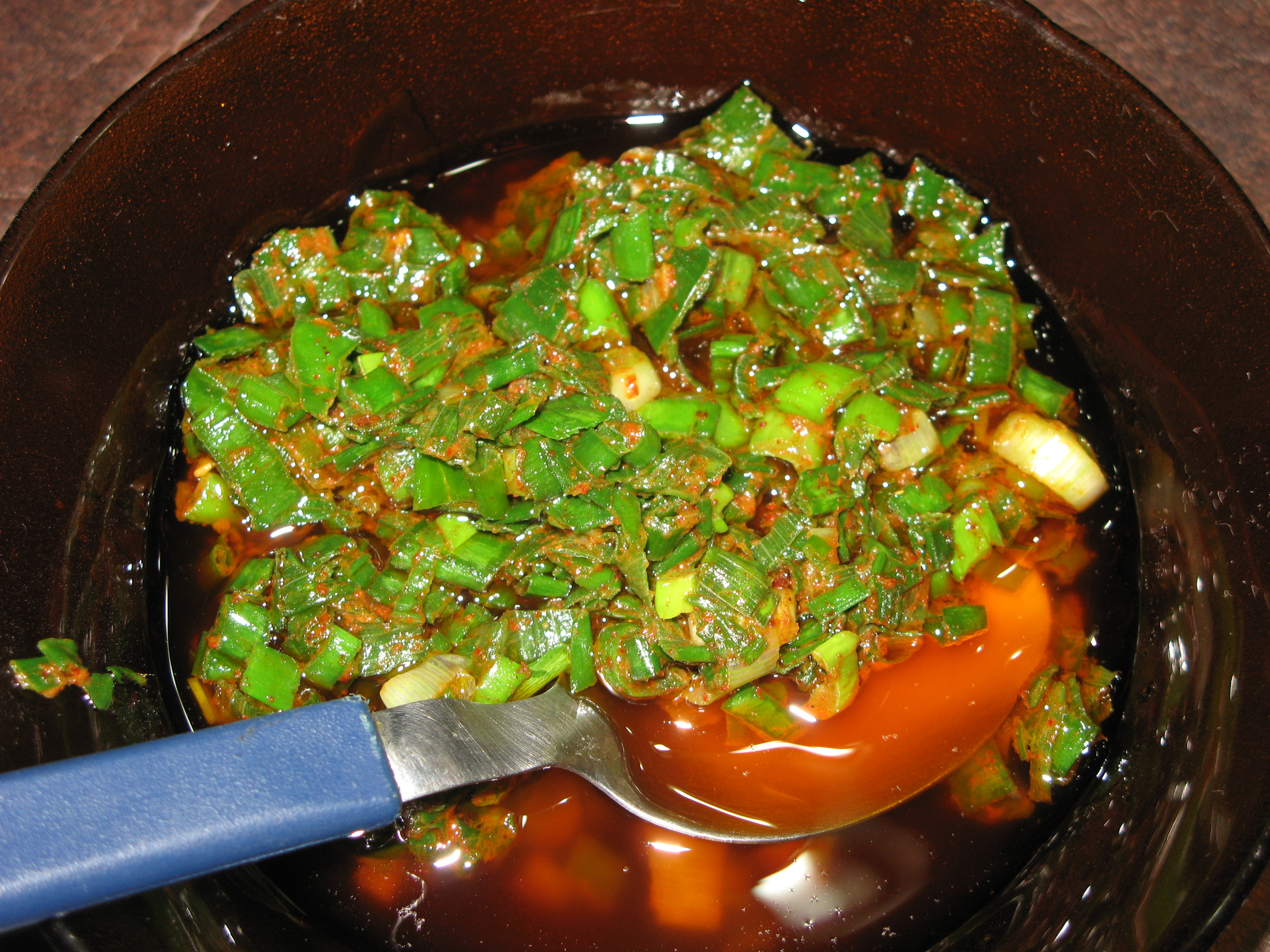
Argentine Quiquirimichi

== See also ==
- List of Ecuadorian dishes and foods
- List of stews
