= Chicken and duck blood soup =

Shanghainese soup-based blood dish

Chicken and duck blood soup (Chinese: 鸡鸭血汤; pinyin: jī yā xiě tāng) is a Shanghainese soup-based blood dish, using the blood of chicken and duck as a principal ingredient. Created by Xu Fuquan, a hawker from Shanghai, and described to be sour and spicy in taste, the dish is viewed as a healthy food with medicinal value in Shanghai.

== History ==
Chicken and duck blood soup was invented by little-known Shanghainese hawker Xu Fuquan, who made the dish by mixing hot chicken and duck blood with the head and feet of a chicken, before boiling it in an iron pot, which he dubbed a "metal cow". In 1973, during his visit to Shanghai, then-King of Cambodia Norodom Sihanouk tried chicken and duck blood soup and reportedly enjoyed the dish a lot, having consumed countless bowls of it.

== Preparation and description ==
The soup is made by boiling the blood of chicken and duck, alongside a handful of chicken organs and other body parts. Chicken and duck blood soup is described as having a sour-spicy taste. The dish is viewed as a healthy food with medicinal value in Shanghai.

== Cultural impact ==
Chicken and duck blood soup is so famous in Shanghai that one source goes on to label it as a cultural icon of the city. It is sold mostly at Shanghai's City God Temple. Kellie Schmitt of CNN describes the dish as one of "Shanghai's weirdest foods", although adding that it "tastes better than it looks".

== See also ==
- Czernina
- Duck blood and vermicelli soup
- Shanghai cuisine
- List of Chinese soups
- List of duck dishes
- List of soups
