= Schwarzsauer =

Blood soup

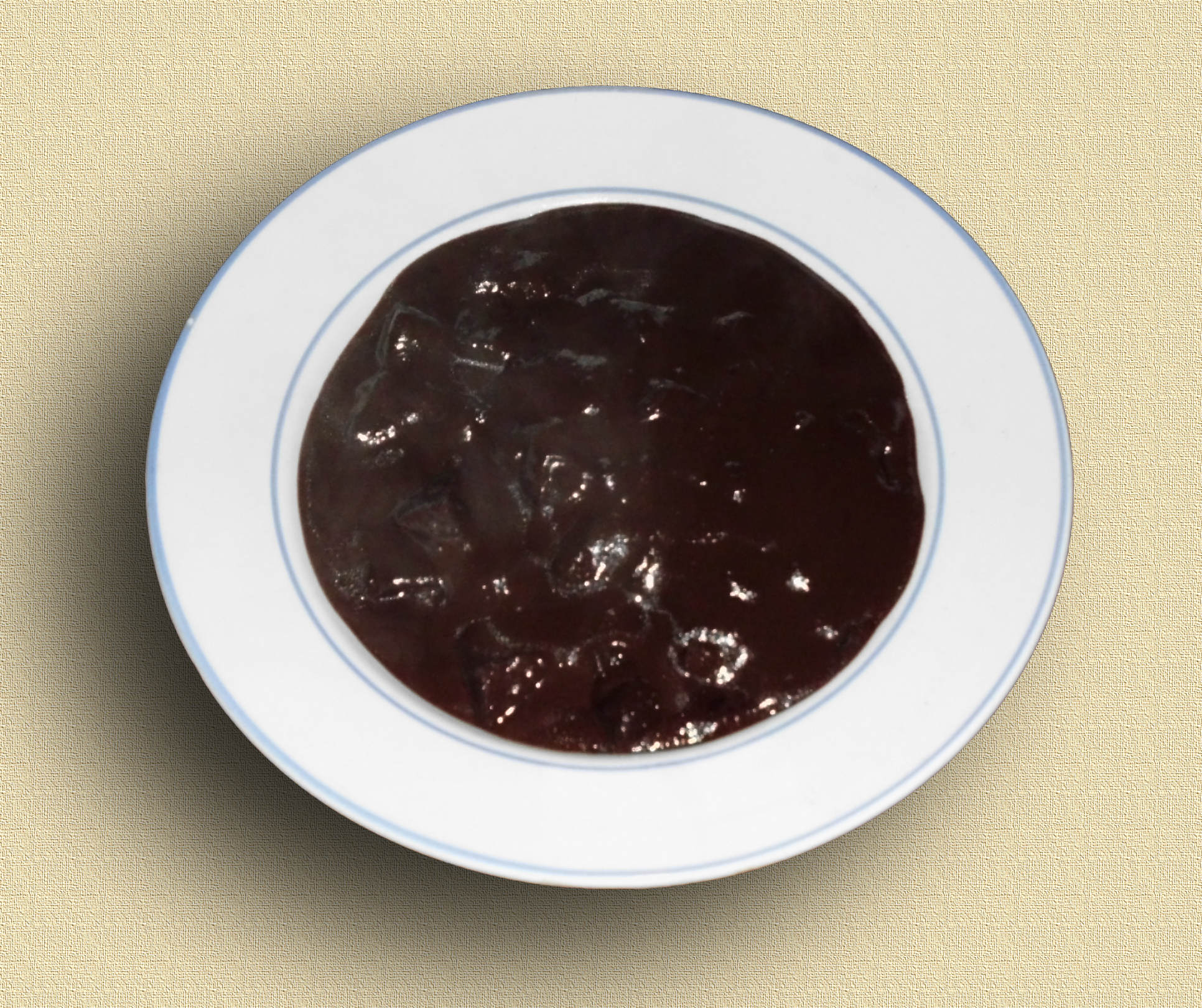
Schwarzsauer

Schwarzsauer (German: [ˈʃvaʁt͡sˌzaʊ̯ɐ]) is a North German blood soup with various spices cooked in vinegar-water and a sort of black pudding made with vinegar. It is a traditional dish in parts of northern Germany and formerly also in East Prussia. It is similar to the Spartan black soup.
