= Kandaulos =

Ancient Greek luxury dish

Kandaulos (Ancient Greek: κάνδαυλος, also κάνδῡλος, ὁ) was an ancient Greek luxury dish of Lydian origin. The Ionian rich savoury confection was a new delicacy in Athens in the early 4th century BC. According to the Greek rhetorician and grammarian Athenaeus (late 2nd century AD), kandaulos came in three forms. One of them was sweet, and is described by one Hellenistic source as a πλακοῦς, flat cake. A second was savoury, consisting of meat and broth with breadcrumbs. However, what these two kinds of kandaulos had in common with one another or with the third kind is not clear.

The term kandaulos appears to be related to the Lydian word Kandaules (Κανδαύλης), recorded by Hipponax and Herodotus. This was a title of Hermes and Heracles and name or title of a Lydian king. But Tzetzes, a Byzantine poet and grammarian from the 12th century, says that kandaules was also Lydian for dog-throttler.

Athenaeus (Deipnosophists XII 516c-d) quotes a brief recipe for the meaty version of kandaulos from Hegesippus of Tarentum, an author of Greek works on cookery and on cake-making of the 4th century BC:

The Lydians used also to speak of a dish called kandaulos, of which there were three varieties, not one merely; so exquisitely equipped were they for luxurious indulgence. Hegesippus of Tarentum says that it was made of boiled meat, bread crumbs, Phrygian cheese, anise, and fatty broth.

In the original Greek:

καὶ κάνδαυλον δέ τινα ἔλεγον οἱ Λυδοί, οὐχ ἕνα ἀλλὰ τρεῖς· οὕτως ἐξήσκηντο πρὸς τὰς ἡδυπαθείας. γίνεσθαι δ᾽ αὐτόν φησιν ὁ Ταραντῖνος Ἡγήσιππος ἐξ ἑφθοῦ κρέως καὶ κνηστοῦ ἄρτου καὶ Φρυγίου τυροῦ ἀνήθου τε καὶ ζωμοῦ πίονος.

== See also ==
- Ancient Greek cuisine
