= Pork blood soup =

Soup made with pork blood

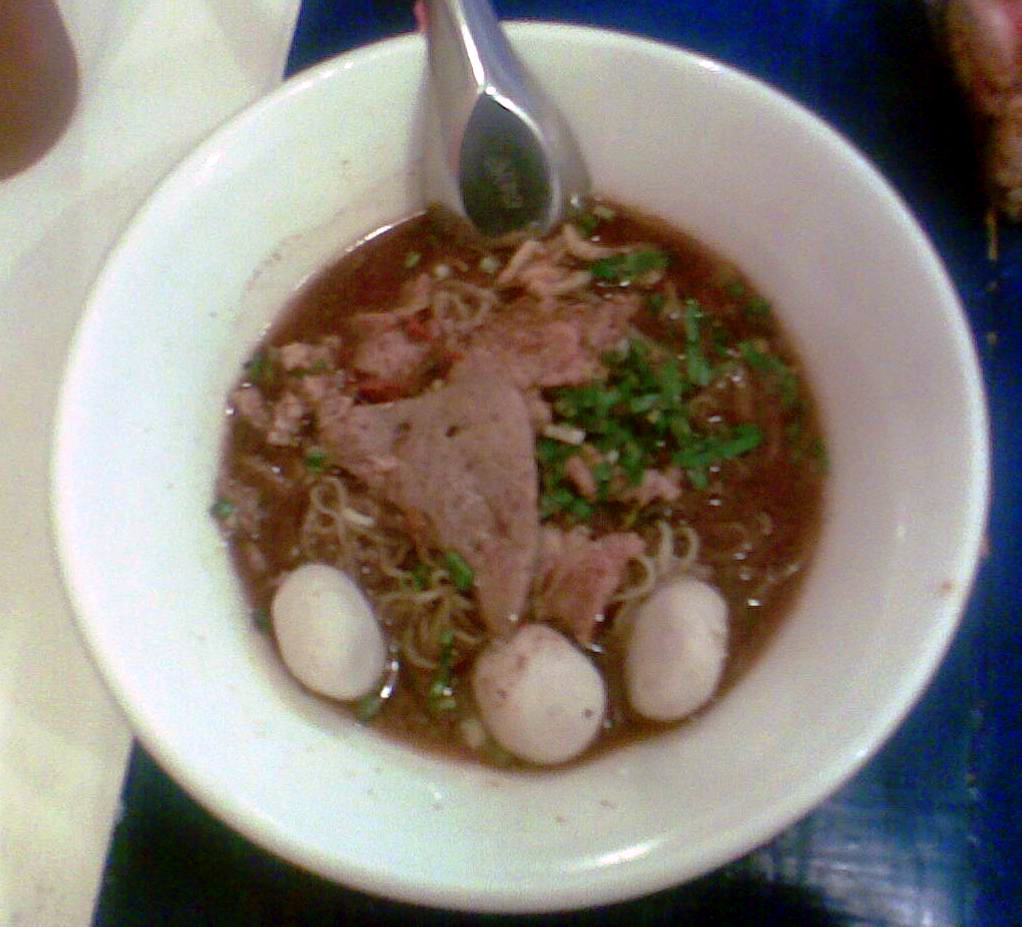
Kuaitiao nam tok is a Thai noodle soup; one of its main ingredients is raw blood.

Pork blood soup is a soup that uses pork blood as its primary ingredient. Additional ingredients may include barley and herbs such as marjoram, as well as other foods and seasonings. Some versions are prepared with coagulated pork blood and other coagulated pork offal, such as intestine, liver and heart.

== Varieties ==
=== China ===
Pork blood soup is soup in Chinese cuisine, and was consumed by laborers in Kaifeng "over 1,000 years ago", along with offal dumplings called jiaozi.

=== Czech Republic ===
Prdelačka (literal meaning: "arse soup", from colloquial term prdel, 'arse') is a traditional Czech pork blood soup made during the pig slaughter season. It is prepared with pork blood pudding, potato, onion and garlic as primary ingredients.

=== Thailand ===
Pork blood soup is soup in Thai cuisine. Guay Tiao Namtok is a Thai pork blood soup noodle that is prepared with pork blood as a soup base. The dish may come from Chinese cuisine, since some part of southern Chinese evacuated to Thailand for a century.

== See also ==
- Blood as food
- Blood soup – contains a list of blood soups
- List of Chinese soups
- List of pork dishes
- List of soups
