= Juka (soup) =

Lithuanian blood soup

- Type: Blood soup
- Place of origin: Lithuania
- Region or state: Dzūkija
- Main ingredients: Goose, duck, or chicken blood

Juka or Kruvainė is a blood soup from the Dzūkija region of southern Lithuania. It can be made using goose, duck, or chicken blood.

== See also ==
- List of soups
