= Yawarlukru =

Traditional Ecuadorian stew

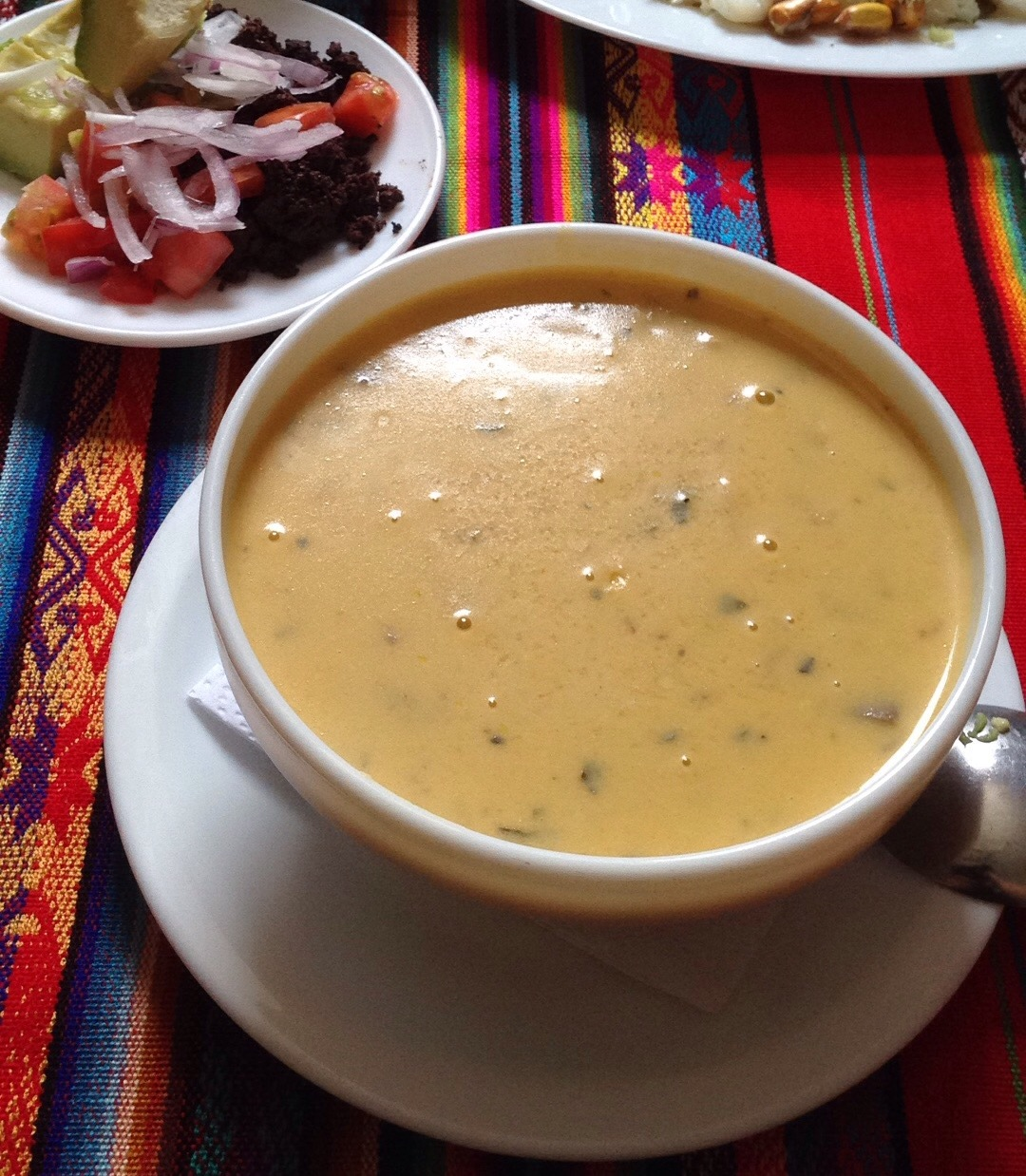
A bowl of Yawarlukru

Yawarlukru or Yawar lukru (Kichwa, Yahuarlocro, Yahuar Locro; transl. blood soup) is a traditional stew of Ecuadorian cuisine in the Andes with lamb's entrails including brain, intestines, liver, lung, tongue, and rumen. It is usually served with fried lamb blood, avocado and pickled red onion rings.
