= Breakfast by country =

Breakfast, the first meal of the day eaten after waking from the night's sleep, varies in composition and tradition across the world.

== Africa ==
Breakfast in Africa varies greatly from region to region.

=== Algeria ===
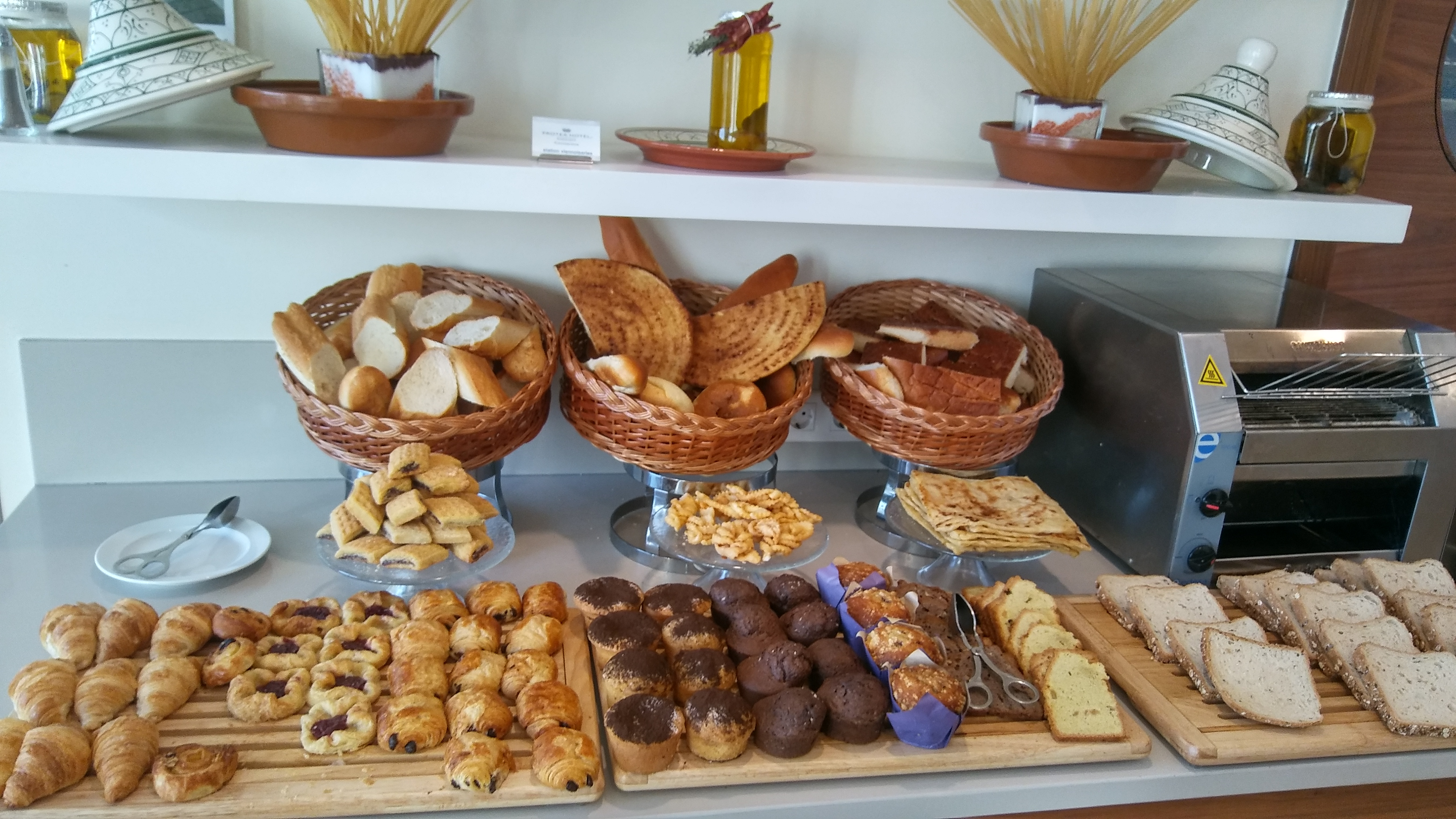
Algerian breakfast foods

Due to Algeria's history of having been a colony of France, breakfast in Algeria is heavily influenced by French cuisine and most commonly consists of café au lait or espresso along with a sweet pastry (some common examples are croissants, mille-feuilles, pain au chocolats known as "petits pains", etc.) or some kind of traditional bread with a date filling or jam (kesra, bradj, etc.)

=== Egypt ===
Most Egyptians begin the day with a light breakfast. Ful medames (dish of cooked fava beans), one of Egypt's several national dishes, is typical. It is seasoned with salt and cumin, garnished with vegetable oil and optionally with tahini, chopped parsley, chopped tomato, garlic, onion, lemon juice and chili pepper, and often served topped with a boiled egg. It is scooped up and eaten with the staple whole wheat pita bread called Eish Masri or Eish Baladi (Egyptian Arabic: عيش Egyptian Arabic pronunciation: [ʕeːʃ]; Modern Standard Arabic: ʿayš) and usually accompanied by taʿamiya (Egyptian Arabic: طعمية) which is the local variant of falafel made with fava beans, fresh cut homemade French fries and various fresh or pickled vegetables (called torshi). Several kinds of cheeses are popular, including gebna bēḍa or Domyati cheese, gebna rūmi (Roman cheese) which is similar to Pecorino Romano or Manchego, and Istanbuli cheese (a brined white cheese with peppers added to the brine which makes it spicy). Fried eggs with pastirma is also a common breakfast food in Egypt.

=== Malawi ===
For breakfast, some children in Malawi eat porridge, cornbread, savory fritters, and boiled starchy vegetables, such as white potatoes, sweet potatoes, or pumpkin, and drink sweet black tea.

=== Morocco ===
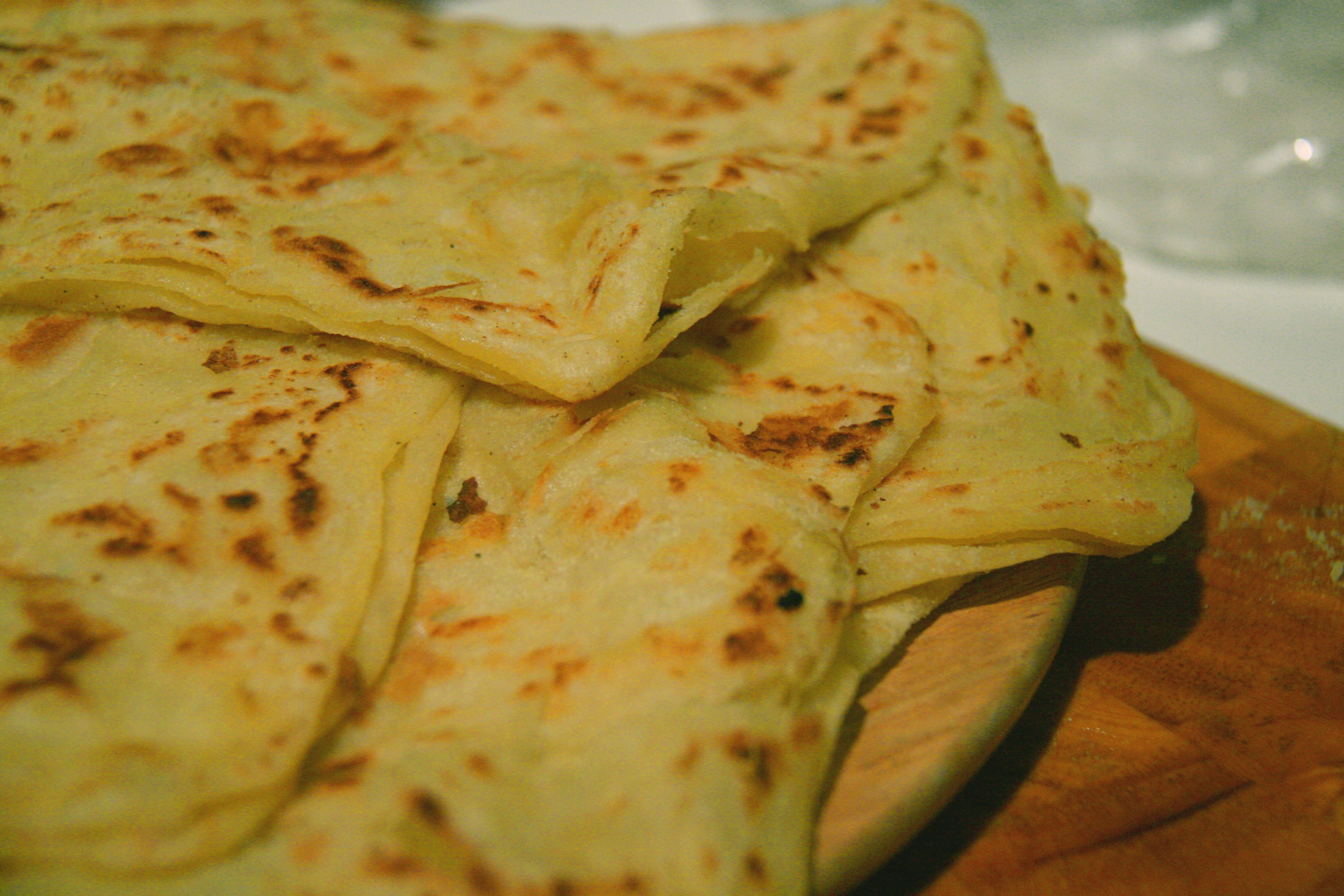
Msemen, a common breakfast in Moroccan cuisine

For breakfast, many Moroccans eat bread, harcha (semolina griddle cakes), or msemen (oiled pancakes) with olive oil, tea, and different kinds of Moroccan crepes.

=== Nigeria ===
Nigeria has over 250 different ethnic groups, with a corresponding variety of cuisines. For the Hausa of northern Nigeria, a typical breakfast consists of kosai (cakes made from ground beans which are then fried) or funkaso (wheat flour soaked for a day then fried and served with sugar). Both of these cakes can be served with porridge and sugar known as koko. For the southwestern Yoruba people (Ilé Yorùbá) one of the most common breakfasts is Ògì— a porridge made from corn, usually served with evaporated milk. Ògì is eaten with Acarajé (akara) or Moi moi. Both are made from ground bean paste; akara is fried in oil, and moi moi is wrapped in leaves or foil and then steamed. Ògì can also be steamed in leaves to harden it and eaten with akara or moi moi for breakfast. English tea or malta is served as a breakfast drink. Another popular option in southwest Nigeria is Gari, which is eaten like cereal. Gari, known in Brazil as farofa, is made from the root of cassava. For breakfast, it is soaked in water and sweetened with sugar.

=== Senegal ===
Breakfast typically consists of café Touba, (Note: The World Bank wrote that a progressive elimination of imported coffee seems common in poorer areas of Senegal as a result of the global recession of 2009: a Senegalese restaurant owner stated, "We weren't used to consume [sic] the Tuba Coffee for breakfast, but since the crisis people drink it a lot, also children.") spiced coffee with abundant sugar sometimes consumed with dried milk, or kinkeliba tea. Small beignets and fresh fruit, including mangoes and bananas, are often part of a simple breakfast, and are accompanied by baguette with various spreads: Chocoleca (a Nutella equivalent made from peanuts), butter, or processed mild cheese.

=== Somalia ===
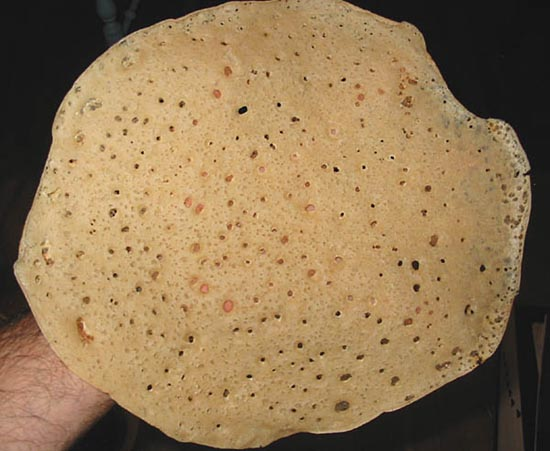
Canjeero (injera), a popular dish in Somalian cuisine

Breakfast (quraac) is an important meal for Somalis, who often start the day with some style of tea (shaah). The main dish is typically pancake-like bread (canjeero, canjeelo). It might also be eaten with a stew or soup (maraq). Lahoh is a pancake-like bread originating in Somalia, Djibouti and Yemen. It is often eaten along with honey and ghee or beef jerky (muqmad) and washed down with a cup of tea.

=== Tunisia ===
In Tunisia, Lablabi is a common and popular breakfast stew.

Tunisians also adopted a lot of habits from the French Breakfast during colonization such as having a slice of Baguette with Jam and butter as well as orange juice and coffee with milk.

=== Uganda ===
In Uganda, most tribes have different cuisines but the most popular breakfast dishes are porridge and katogo. Porridge is made by mixing maize flour or millet flour with water and bringing the mixture to a boil. While katogo is made from matoke (green bananas), peeled and cooked in the same pot with a sauce (beef, peanuts, beans, or greens), katogo is served with tea or juice. Both dishes are popular in all regions of Uganda.

== Asia ==
Breakfasts vary widely throughout Asia. In Arab countries, breakfast is often a quick meal, consisting of bread and dairy products, with tea and sometimes jam. Flat bread with olive oil and za'tar is also popular.

=== Bangladesh ===
The typical Bangladeshi breakfast consists of flour-based flatbreads such as chapati, roti, or paratha, served with a curry. Usually, the curry can be mixed vegetable (sobji), home-fried potatoes (alu vaji), lentil (dal), scrambled eggs (dim vaji). Luxurious breakfast usually includes chicken rejala, beef or mutton paya and liver curry (gila-kolija). The breakfast varies according to location and the eater's income. In villages and rural areas, rice with curry (potato mash, dal) is mostly preferred by day laborers. In the city, sliced bread with jam, jelly, butter and omelette is chosen due to time efficiency. In Bangladesh tea is preferred to coffee and is an essential part of most breakfasts. Having toasted biscuits, bread or puffed rice with tea is also very popular.

=== China ===
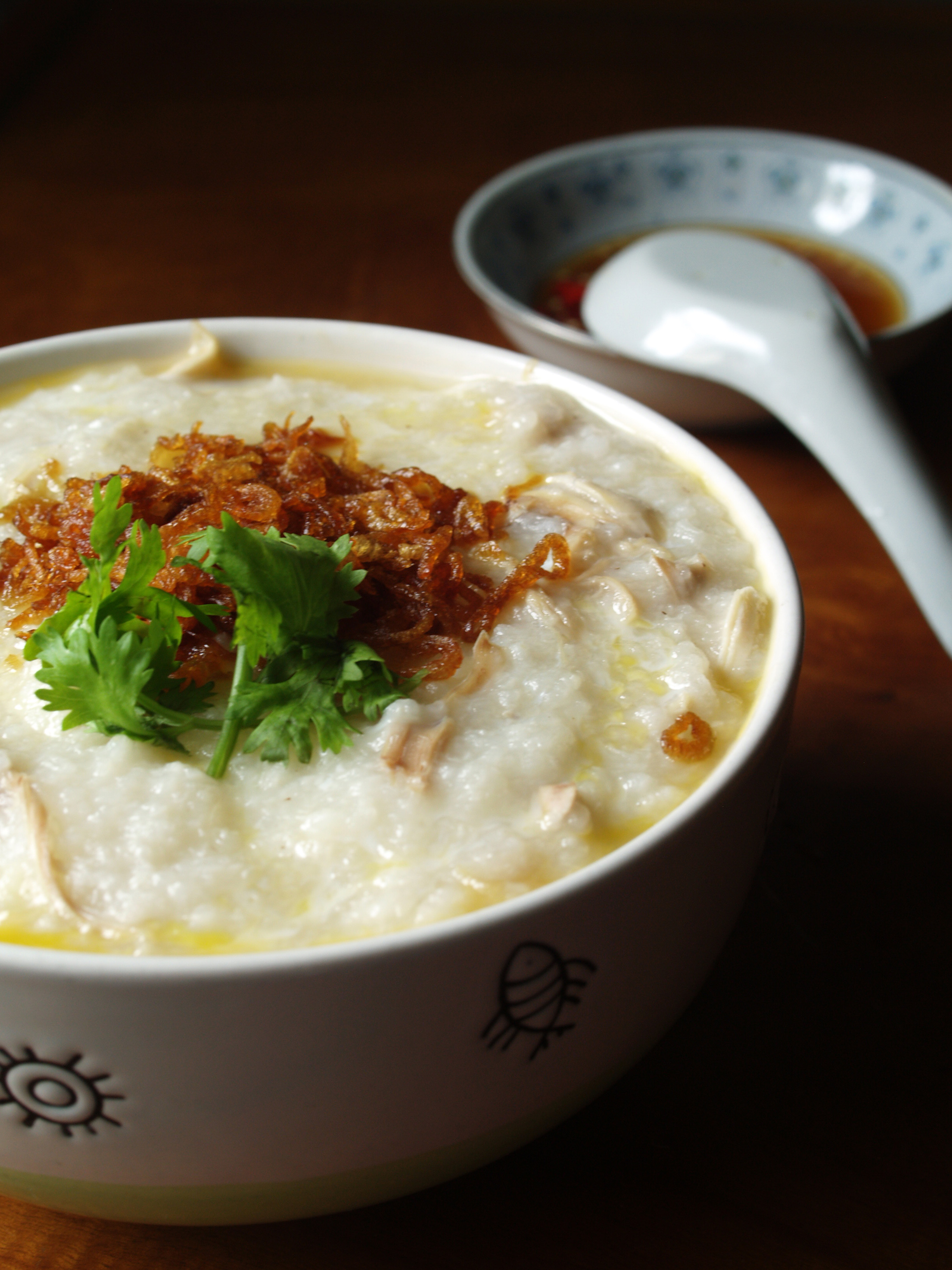
Chinese homemade congee

As mainland China is made up of many distinct provinces, each with its own unique cuisine, breakfast in China can vary significantly from province to province. In general, basic choices include sweet or salty pancakes, soup, deep-fried bread sticks or doughnuts (youtiao), buns (mantou), porridge (congee), and fried or soup-based noodles. These options are often accompanied by tea or sweetened soybean milk. However, condiments for porridge and the soup base tend to vary between provinces and regions. The types of teas that are served and spices that are used can also differ significantly between the provinces.

==== Hong Kong ====
Due to its nearly two centuries' history as a British colony and proximity to China's Canton region, both English and traditional Cantonese style breakfasts are of somewhat equal popularity in Hong Kong, as well as the hybrid form of breakfast commonly offered in Cha chaan teng. Cha Chaan Teng breakfasts often include Hong Kong-style milk tea, pan-fried egg, bread, Cantonese noodles, or Hong Kong-style macaroni in soup. Traditional Cantonese breakfast may include dim sum, which includes a variety of different ingredients and is prepared in numerous different forms from delicately wrapped baby shrimp steamed dumplings to sweet water chestnut cake. Each dish is designed to be sampled and diners can go through a large selection of dim sum quickly accompanied by a generous amount of good tea. Tieguanyin is the most common accompaniment, but other teas such as pu'er and oolong are also common. Fried and rice-based noodles and cakes are also popular. In modern times, dim sum is commonly prepared and served in Yum Cha restaurants rather than at home because of the skill and efforts involved in the preparation.

=== India ===
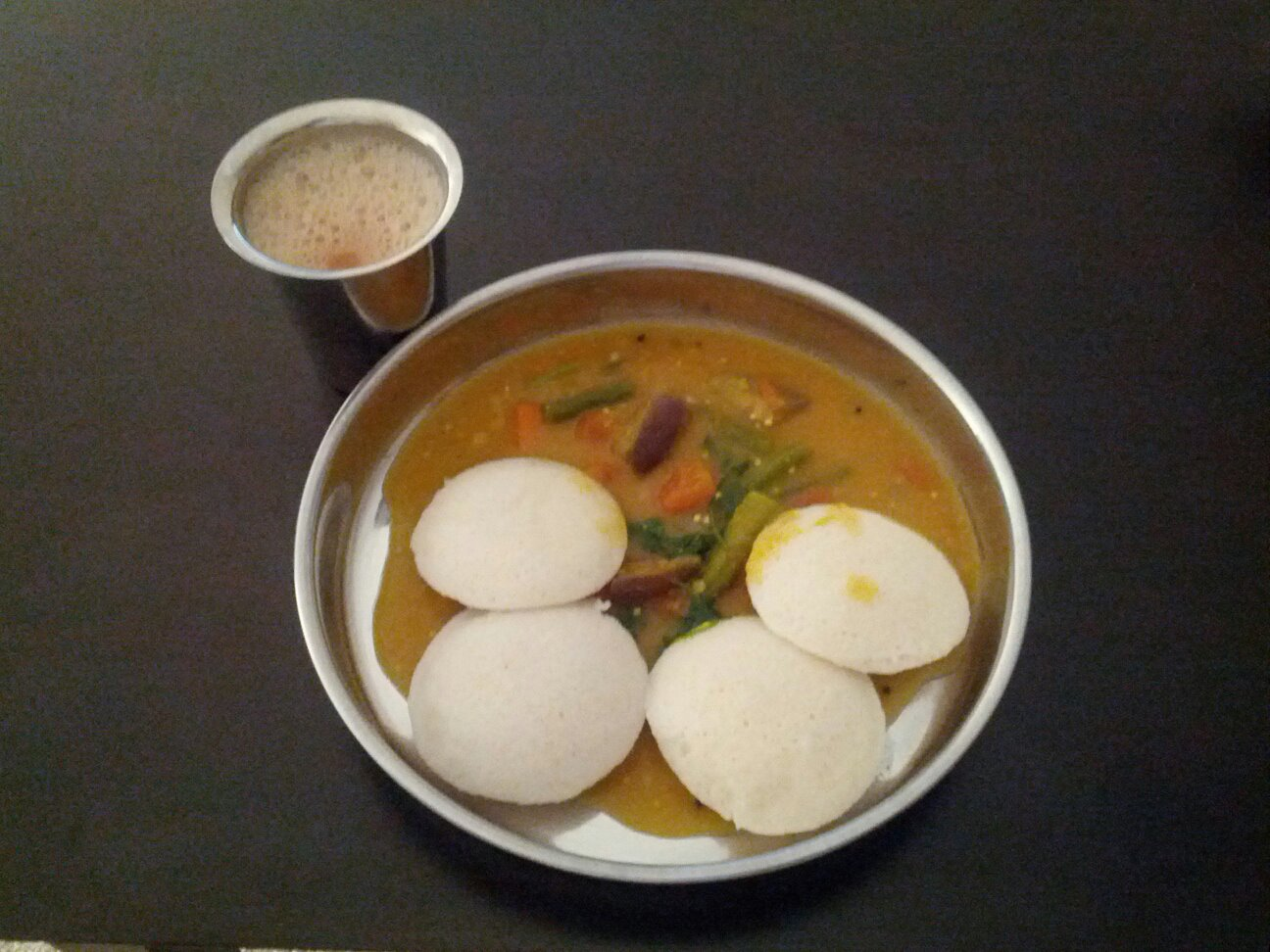
Idli and sambar - a South Indian breakfast

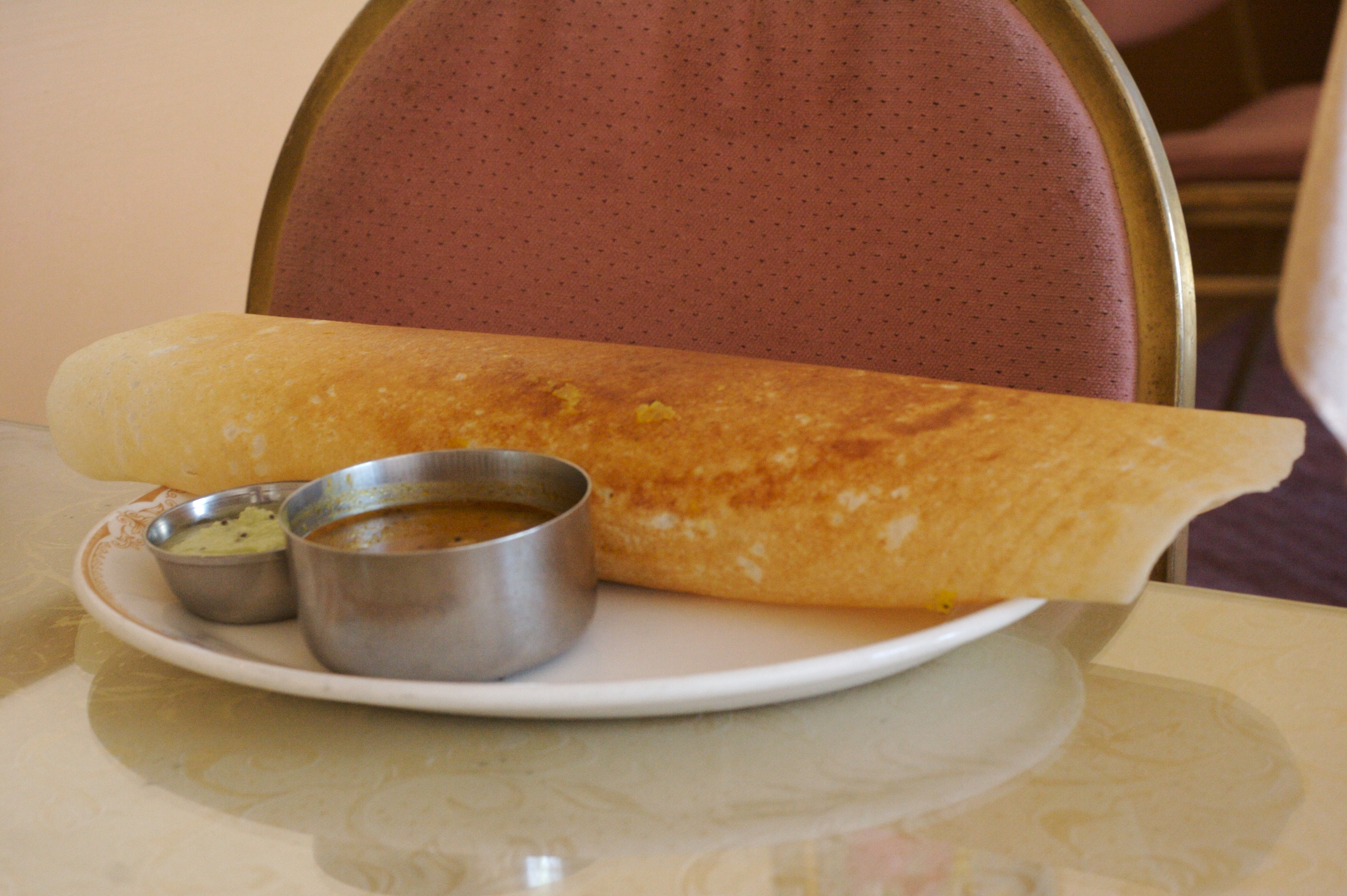
South Indian dosa served with chutney and sambar

Indian breakfasts vary by region. A typical south Indian breakfast consists of idli, vada, or dosa coupled with chutney and sambar. Many variations of these dishes exist such as rava idli, thayir vadai (yogurt vada), sambar vada and masala dosa. Other popular south Indian breakfast items are pongal, bisibelebath, upma, and poori. The state of Kerala has some special breakfast items such as appam, parotta, puttu, idiyappam, and palappam.

The people of Bihar in eastern India eat litti chokha and dahi chura.

A typical north Indian breakfast may either be a type of paratha or roti served with a vegetable curry, curd, and pickles. There are several varieties of parathas available depending on the type of stuffing such as aloo paratha, paneer (cottage cheese) paratha, mooli paratha (radish paratha), etc. Other popular breakfast items in the north are poori bhaji, poha, and bhindi bhujia.

Among Bengals roti and curry are the general variants in breakfast. The menu may also include "Indian French toast" which is also known as "Bombay toast", chire bhaja (flaked rice fried in oil with salt added to taste), and boiled eggs.

In Western India, a Gujarati household may serve dhoklas, khakhras, or theplas for breakfast, the most popular of which is methi thepla. In Mangalore, the breakfast dish oondees may be served. In Maharashtra, the typical breakfast (nashta) consists of kande pohe, upma, ukkad, and thalipeeth. Sometimes, chapati bhaji or a chapati roll with tea becomes breakfast. In South India, a Tamil household may serve idlis, dosas, or vadas for breakfast, the most popular of which is Idli.

In Kashmir, people prefer to have their authentic traditional food items like Noon Chai, Chhir Chot, Kahwa, Girda, Lavasa Masala Tchot and Bakarkhani for breakfast. Sometimes they also eat Chochwor and Roth in their morning meal.

Apart from traditional breakfast, factory produced bread is consumed throughout India with butter, jelly or jam or as French toast, where bread is fried with egg, onions and oil.

=== Indonesia ===
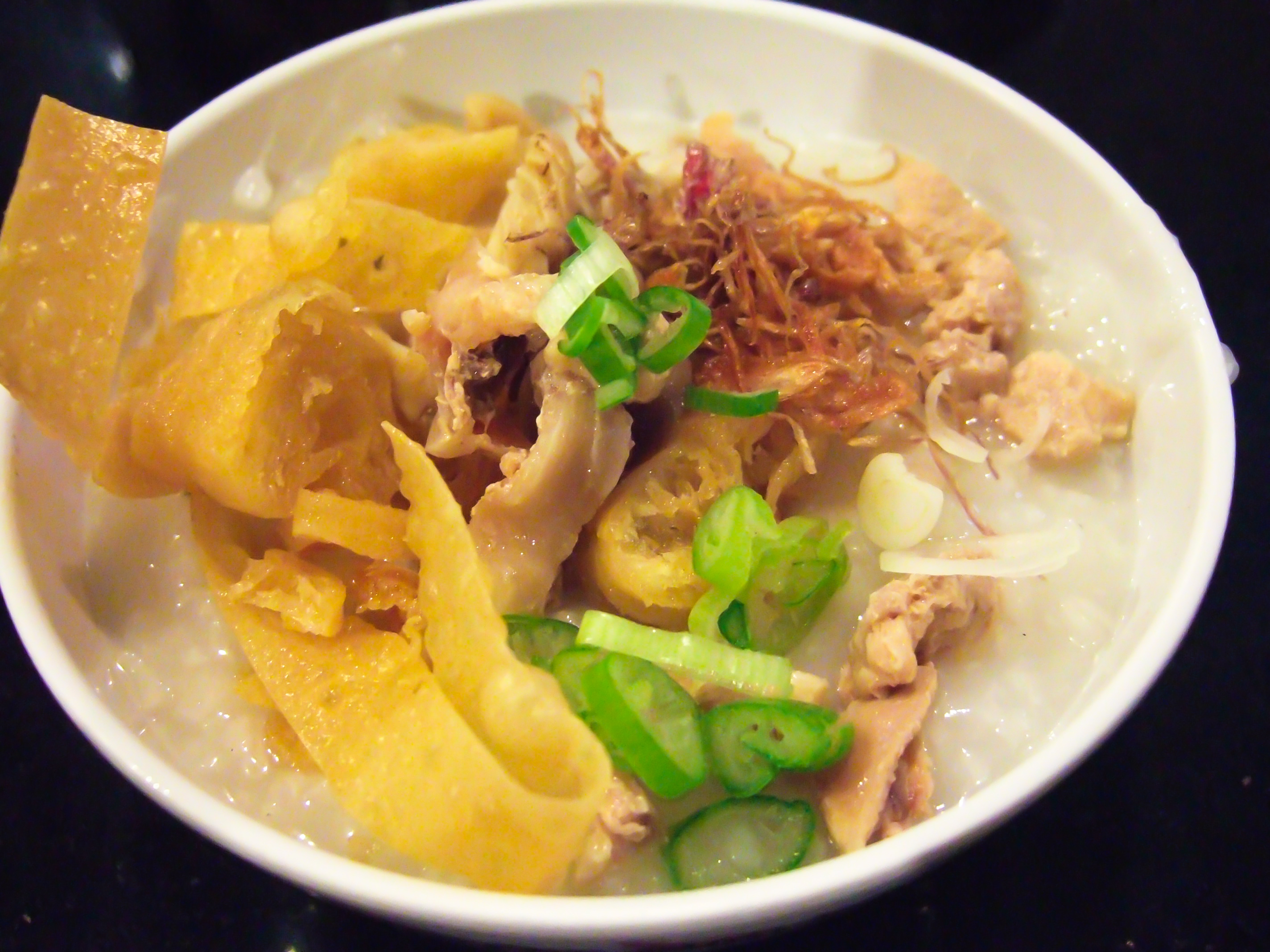
Indonesian chicken porridge

Indonesia is a great melting pot country and multiracial nation with more than 600 ethnic groups. In Indonesian, breakfast is known as sarapan or makan pagi, breakfast options are different in the different areas. Rice is a staple food in Indonesia and commonly served at breakfast. A typical Indonesian breakfast, bubur ayam is a rice congee with shredded chicken meat served with some condiments, such as chopped scallion, crispy fried shallot, celery, tongcai, fried soybean, cakwe, both salty and sweet soy sauce, and sometimes topped with yellow chicken broth and krupuk. Steamed rice in coconut milk known as nasi uduk is made by cooking rice soaked in coconut milk instead of water, along with clove, cassia bark, and lemongrass to add aroma. Sometimes knotted pandan leaves are thrown into the rice while steaming to give it more fragrance. The coconut milk and spices imparts an oily, rich taste to the rice. Nasi gurih, nasi lemak and nasi liwet are breakfast dishes that are similar to nasi uduk.

In eastern Indonesia, a sago congee papeda is a staple breakfast of native people in Maluku and Papua. Papeda is made up of sago starch and generally consumed with mackerel.

However, bread is also a popular choice for breakfast. Roti bakar is a sandwich toast filled with hagelslag or spreads. Kue may be eaten throughout the day for light breakfast, such as arem-arem, bagea, bahulu, gapit, kochi, nagasari, lemper and serabi.

Other typical Indonesian breakfasts include bakpau (meat bun), bihun goreng (fried rice vermicelli), bubur cha cha (cha-cha porridge), bubur kacang hijau (mung beans porridge), bubur sumsum (gruel), burgo (rice pancake in coconut milk-based soup), gado-gado (salad with rice cake in peanut sauce), gudeg (jackfruit curry), ketoprak (salad with rice vermicelli in peanut sauce), lontong sayur (rice cake and vegetable in coconut milk-based soup), nasi campur (mixed rice), nasi goreng (fried rice), nasi kari (rice and curry), nasi kuning (turmeric rice), nasi padang (rice with a variety of dishes), nasi pecel (rice with salad in peanut sauce), panekuk (pancake), roti canai (flatbread), roti gambang (herbs bread), roti jala (net bread), roti john (sandwich with minced meat and egg), sayur sop (vegetable soup in clear broth), soto (traditional soup with different variations) and tinutuan (leafy vegetables porridge).

=== Iran ===
Breakfast in Iran can vary significantly from province to province. Breakfast in Iran generally consists of different kinds of flatbread – such as barbari, tafton, sangak, or lavash or gerdeh – eaten with white cheese, butter, jam, marmalade (morabba), honey, clotted cream (sar sheer), sesame sauce (ardeh) or sesame cream or other sesame products, or nuts and fresh/dried fruits, and accompanied by black tea or coffee. Frequently, breakfast can be as simple as butter and jam on bread with tea. Iranians prefer to drink their hot black tea with sugar. Traditional cooked dishes for breakfast include haleem (wheat and chicken/lamb/turkey porridge eaten with cinnamon), oatmeal or kale pache (sheep's feet, stomach, and other offal), baked beans, adasi (green lentil soup), fried/boiled/soft-boiled eggs, omlet (eggs cooked in tomato sauce).

=== Israel ===
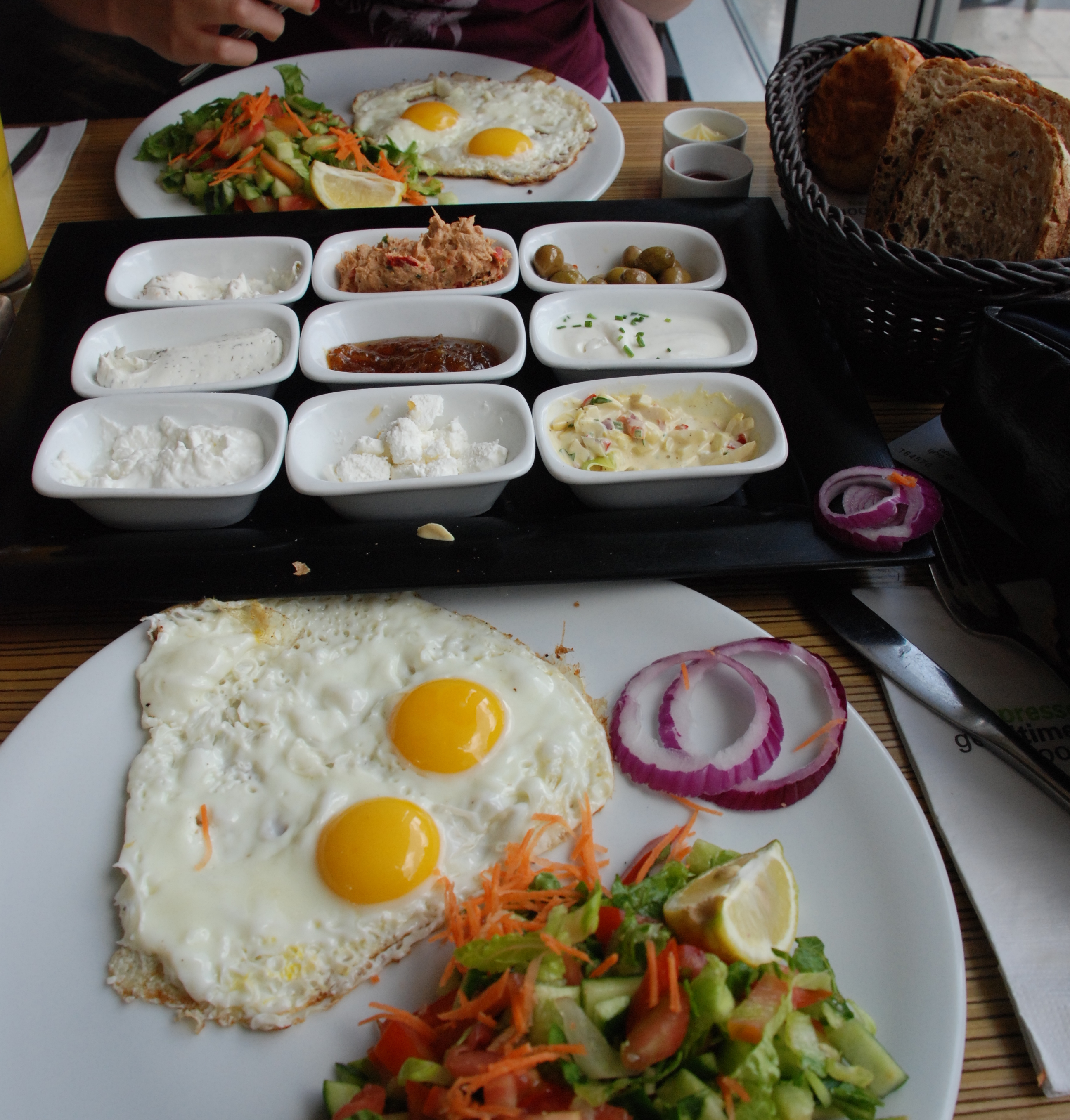
An Israeli breakfast

The Israeli breakfast is a mix of culinary influences from eastern Europe, agrarian Yishuv culture, North African cuisine, and Levantine cuisine. It usually consists of a range of cheeses along with sliced vegetables, scrambled eggs (or another kind of fried egg) and bread, served with spreads like butter, jam, or honey. The most commonly used vegetables are cucumbers, tomatoes, and red bell peppers; carrots, onions and radishes may also be included. Cheeses include, at the very least, cottage cheese, quark or fromage blanc, and a local variety of Edam ("yellow cheese"), and often Tzfatit and labneh too. Side dishes including pickled olives and herring may also be served. Typical Middle Eastern mezze such as Israeli salad, hummus, tehina and baba ghanoush, as well as Shakshouka and a variety of salads may be served. The meal is most often accompanied by coffee, tea and orange juice. A typical Israeli meal could be either dairy- or meat-based, but not both. Only certain types of meat are considered kosher. Israeli hotels usually present this type of breakfast as a buffet. Restaurants may prefer a pre-set "Israeli Breakfast" menu item.

=== Japan ===
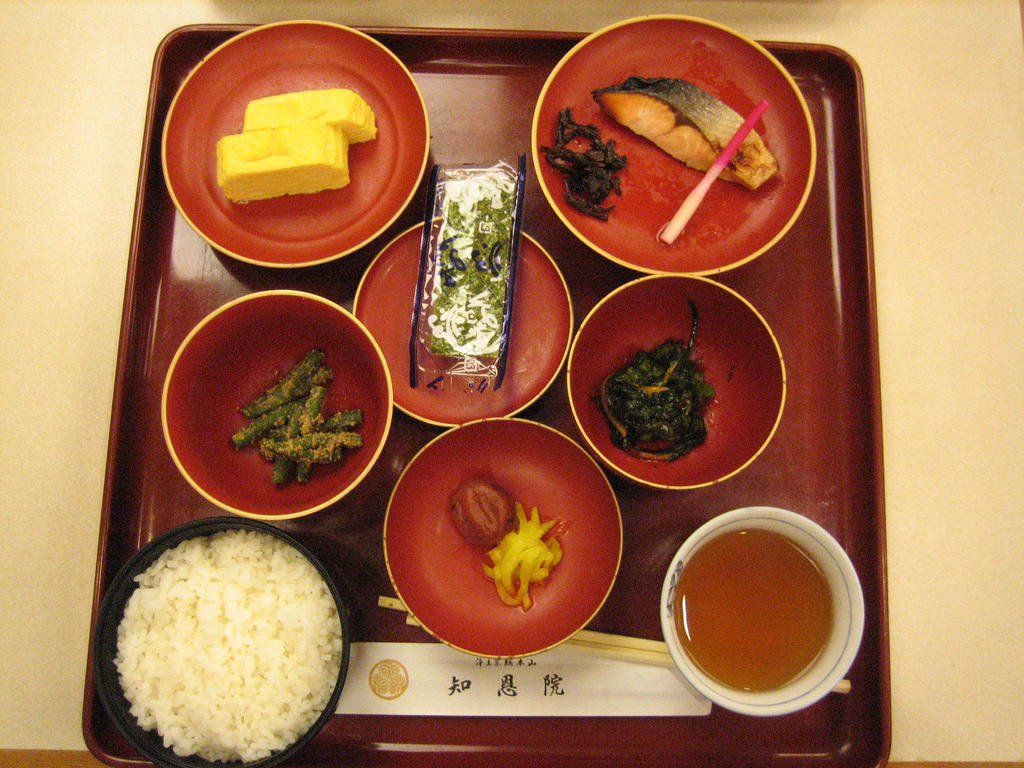
A traditional Japanese breakfast of rice, pickles (umeboshi and takuan), grilled salmon, egg, nori, and vegetables

Breakfast in modern Japanese households comes in two major variations: Japanese style and Western style. Japanese-style breakfasts are eaten widely in Japan, but often only on weekends and non-working days. Younger Japanese couples may prefer Western-style breakfasts because they are generally less time-consuming to prepare. The standard Japanese breakfast consists of steamed white rice, a bowl of miso soup, and Japanese-style pickles (like takuan or umeboshi). A raw egg and nori are often served; the raw egg is beaten in a small bowl and poured on the hot rice to make golden colored tamago kake gohan, whilst the nori (sheets of dried seaweed) is used to wrap rice. Grilled fish and Japanese green tea are often served as well.

Western-style breakfasts in Japanese households are similar to those in the United States. Japanese children often eat corn flakes and drink milk, hot chocolate or fruit juice. Japanese adults (especially younger ones) tend to have toast with butter or jam, eggs, and slices of vegetables. They often drink coffee or orange juice. Traditional Japanese inns (like ryokan) serve complete traditional breakfast. Western-style hotels and restaurants in Japan generally offer a mix of the Western and Japanese styles.

=== Korea ===
Traditionally, Korean breakfasts consist mainly of rice and soup dishes. These can include small amounts of fish or beef, and some form of broth, stew or porridge. Like all Korean meals, breakfast is usually served with banchan, or side dishes consisting of kimchi, Gyeran-jjim (steamed eggs) and tofu.

=== Levant ===
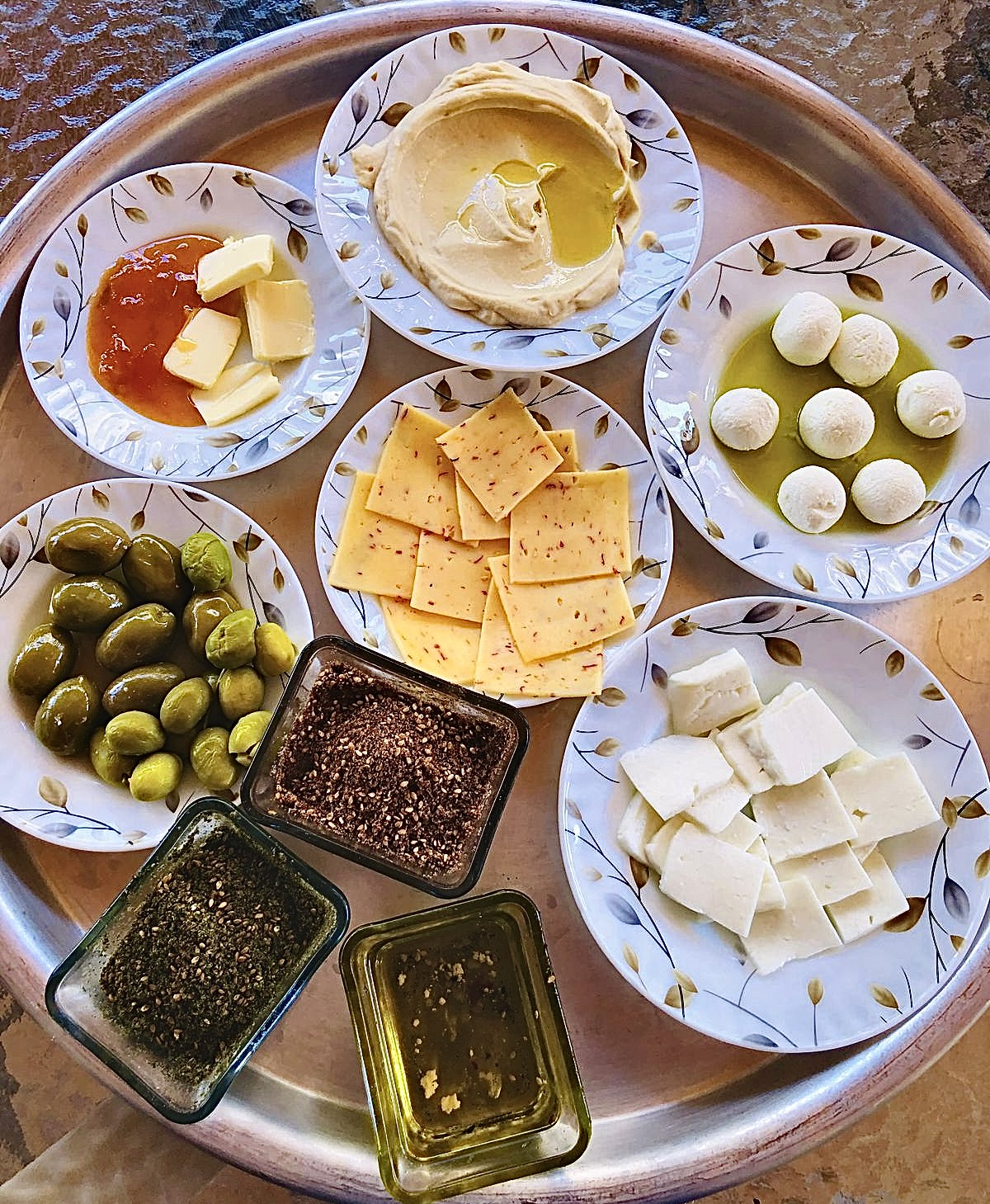
Traditional Levantine breakfast with a variety of olives, cheeses, spices and sauces.

The Levant region includes countries such as Lebanon, Syria, Jordan, Israel and Palestine. These meals reflect culinary traditions and cultural heritage of the area. A popular Levantine breakfast option is Manakish. Manakish is typically served hot and fresh from the oven with a variety of flavors and sides.

=== Malaysia and Singapore ===
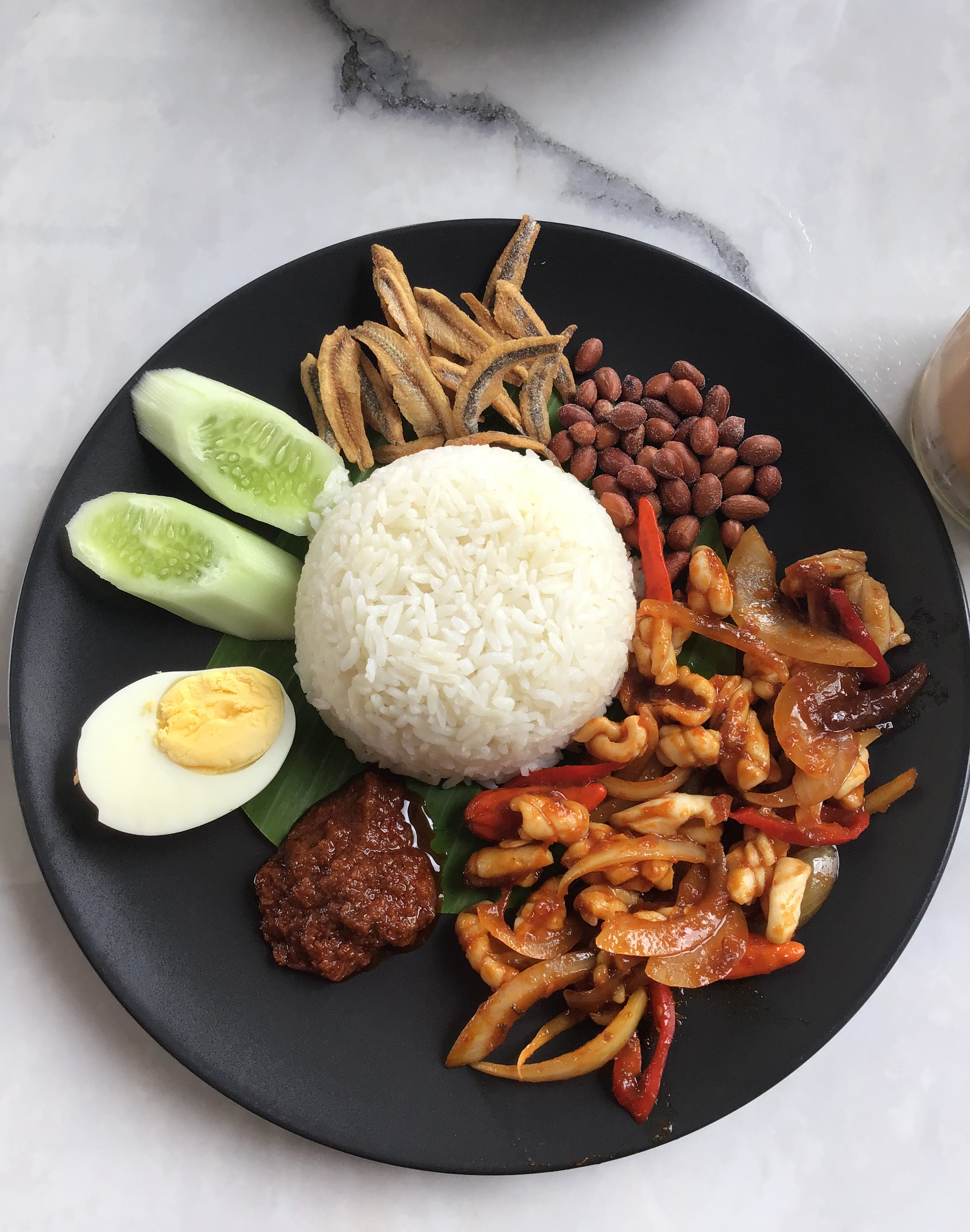
Nasi lemak as served in a Penang restaurant

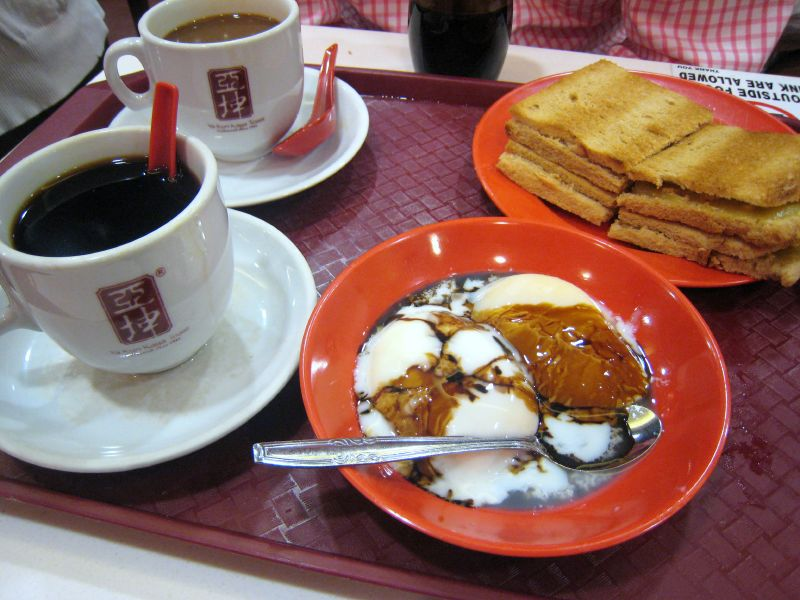
Kaya toast, soft-boiled eggs and two cups of kopi at a Singaporean kopitiam

As multiracial nations, breakfast options vary greatly in both Malaysia and Singapore. Breakfast is typically consumed in various establishments i.e. gerai, kopitiams and hawker centres. A traditional Malaysian and Singaporean breakfast consists of nasi lemak (fragrant coconut rice dish served with various accompaniments, typically sambal, sliced cucumbers, egg, fried chicken, roasted peanuts and fried anchovies), roti canai/prata (Indian-influenced flatbread), teh tarik (milk-infused black tea with a foamy head), kaya toast (coconut milk jam with bread), half-boiled eggs and Kopi (coffee made from robusta beans, typically roasted with butter or margarine and sugar). Locals usually dip the toast into the eggs mixed with soya sauce and pepper. Other commonly consumed dishes include nasi dagang (Coconut rice dish served with pickled vegetables and curried tongkol), nasi kerabu (rice dish served with fresh vegetables and herbs), laksa (rice noodle dish in spicy broth), fishball noodles, bihun goreng (fried rice vermicelli), dim sum and appam (small savoury pancakes).

=== Myanmar ===
In Burma, the traditional breakfast is htamin jaw, fried rice with boiled peas (pè byouk), and yei nway jan (green tea), especially among the poor. Glutinous rice or kao hnyin is steamed and wrapped in banana leaf often served with peas as kao hnyin baung with a sprinkle of crushed and salted toasted sesame. Equally popular is the purple variety of rice known as nga cheik which is cooked the same way and called nga cheik paung. Si damin is sticky rice cooked with turmeric and onions in peanut oil which is served with crushed and salted toasted sesame and crisp fried onions. Assorted fritters such as baya jaw (urad dal) are often served as a complement.

Nan bya or naan (Indian-style flatbreads) again with pè byouk or simply buttered, is served with Indian tea or coffee. It goes well with hseiksoup (mutton soup). Fried chapati, blistered like nan bya but crispy, with pè byouk and crispy fried onions is a popular alternative. Htat ta ya, lit. "a hundred layers", is flaky multi-layered fried paratha served with either pè byouk or a sprinkle of sugar. Eeja gway (Chinese-style fried breadsticks or youtiao) with Indian tea or coffee is another favourite. Mohinga, perhaps the most popular of all, now available as an "all-day breakfast" in many towns and cities, is rice vermicelli in fish broth kept on the boil with chickpea flour or crushed toasted rice, lemon grass, sliced banana stem, onions, garlic, ginger, pepper and fish paste and served with crispy fried onions, crushed dried chilli, coriander, fish sauce and lime. Add fritters such as split chickpea (pè jan jaw), urad dal (baya jaw) or gourd (bu jaw), boiled egg and fried fish cake (nga hpè jaw).

=== Pakistan ===
In Pakistan, breakfast can consist of paratha (a South Asian flatbread) and an omelette with black milk tea. Another common dish is nihari. Nihari is a popular meat-based dish, originally from Old Delhi. It may be served with various South Asian flatbreads (such as the aforementioned paratha). When Pakistan gained independence in 1947, numerous immigrants from Delhi settled in Karachi and established their own restaurants. As a result, nihari is associated with Pakistani cuisine. The dish's name comes from an Arabic word for “morning” (nehar). Other common dishes eaten for breakfast in Pakistan include halwa poori and siri paya.

=== Philippines ===
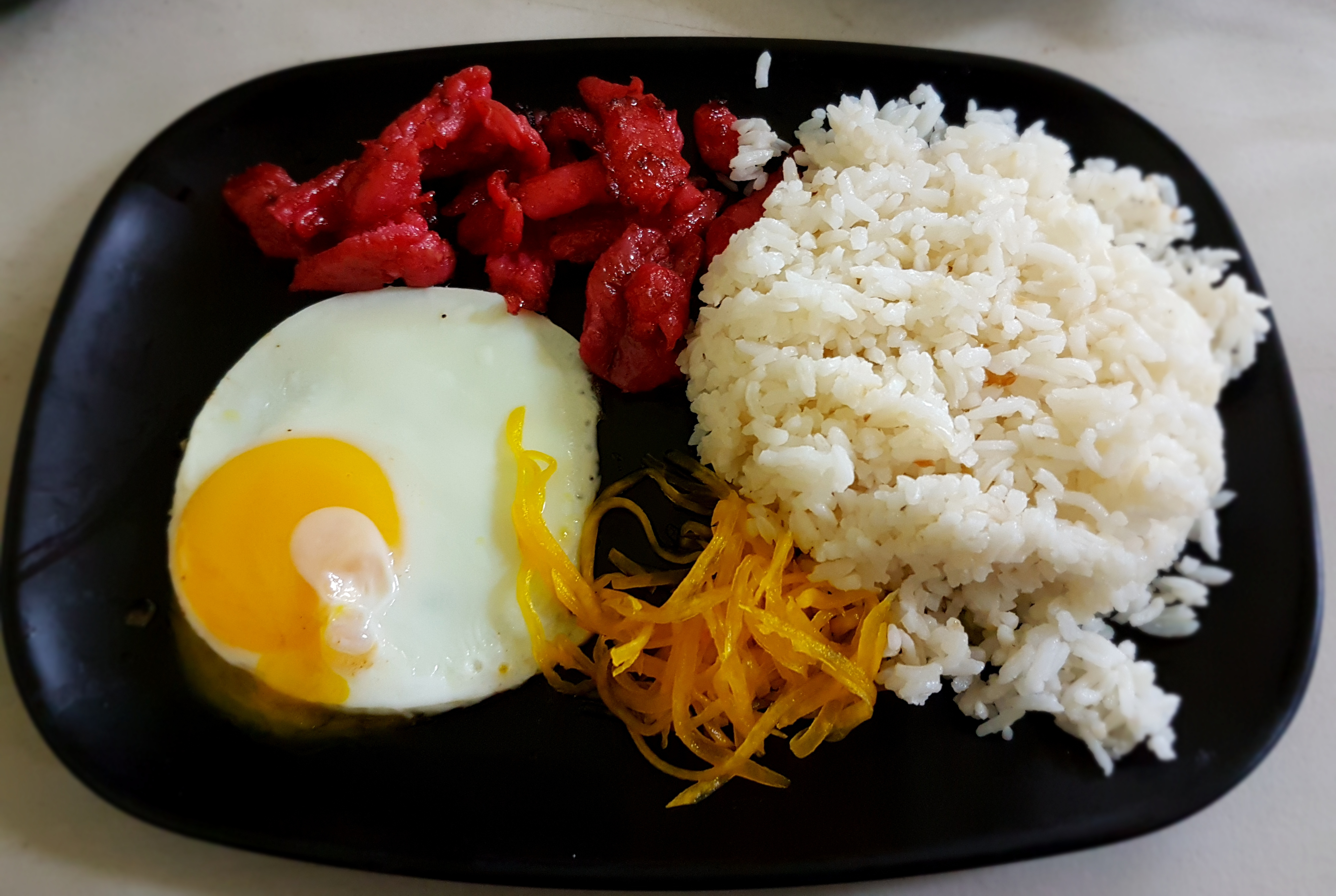
A tocilog served with atchara

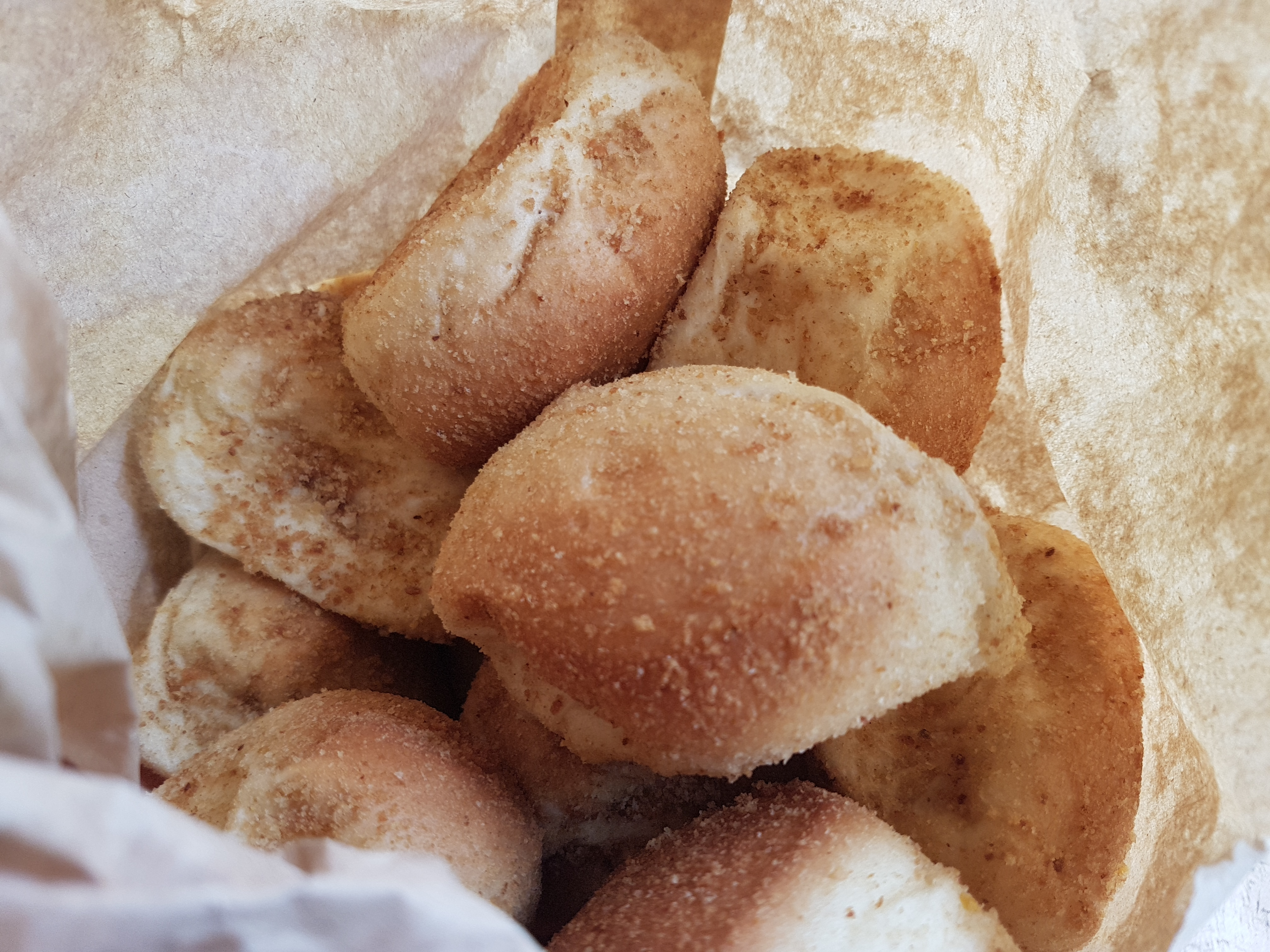
Pandesal

A typical Filipino breakfast usually includes one or more fried eggs (either scrambled or sunny side-up), tocino, dried fish known as tuyo, tapa, and fried rice, normally seasoned with garlic. The word silog is a portmanteau of sinangag (garlic fried rice) and itlog (egg), which form the basis of many breakfast combinations. These combinations include tapsilog (with tapa), tocilog (with tocino), and longsilog (with longganisa). Breakfast is usually served at seven in the morning since school classes start relatively early. If a cooked breakfast is unavailable, a bread called pandesal is eaten instead, together with cheese, peanut butter, jam, or kesong puti as spreads.

Breakfast time typically occurs between 6:00 AM and 9:00 AM, though specific times vary depending on the setting.

=== Taiwan ===
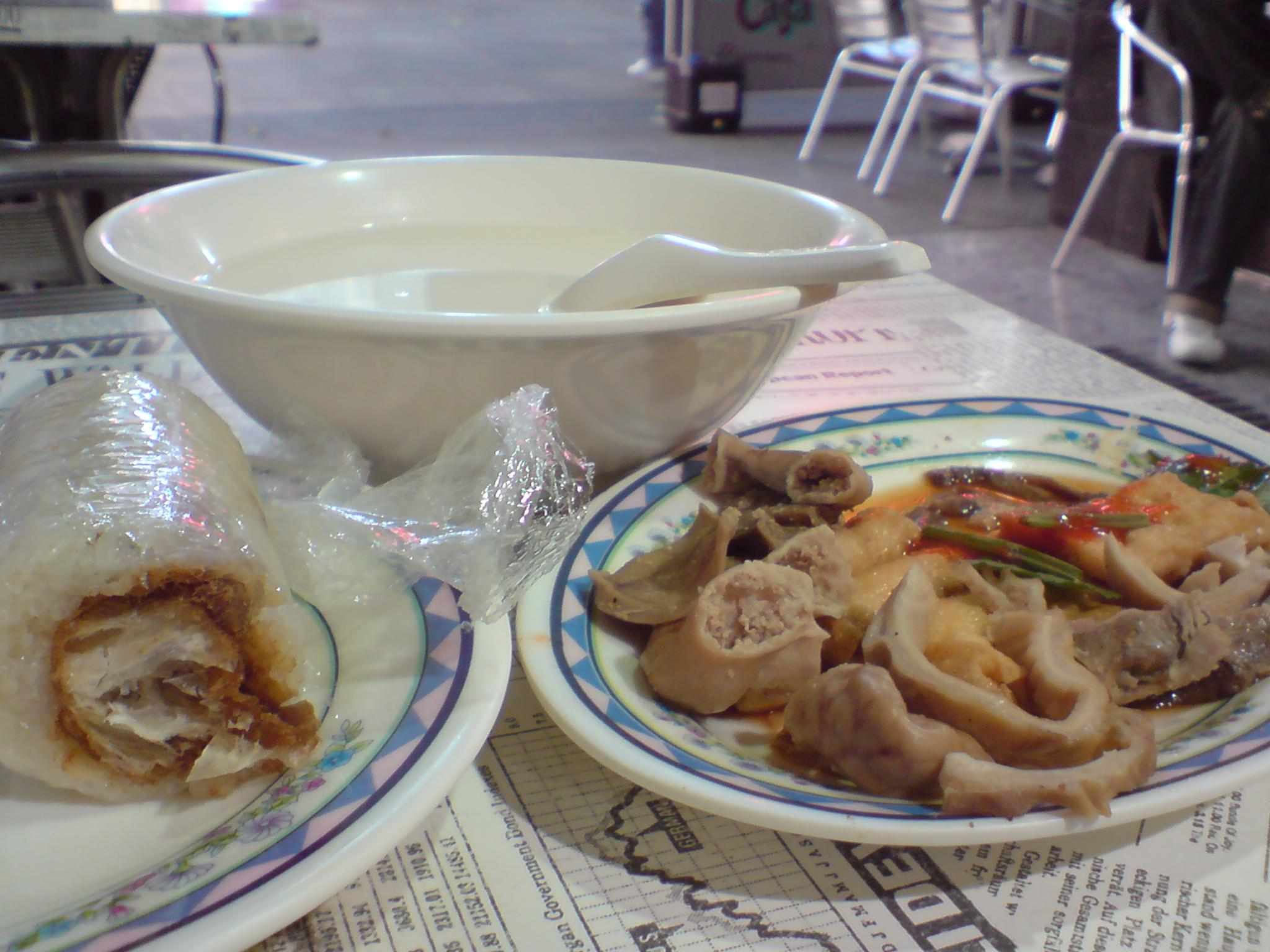
Taiwanese breakfast

Traditional Taiwanese breakfasts consist of a variety of dishes, usually containing a lot of carbohydrates and proteins to start off the day. In northern Taiwan, shaobing and youtiao are common and usually washed down by a hot or cold glass of soymilk or rice milk. Other popular dishes include scallion pancake, turnip cake, and danbing. Down south, typical breakfast dishes include milkfish congee, eel noodles, tube rice pudding, beef soup and bubble tea.

== Europe ==
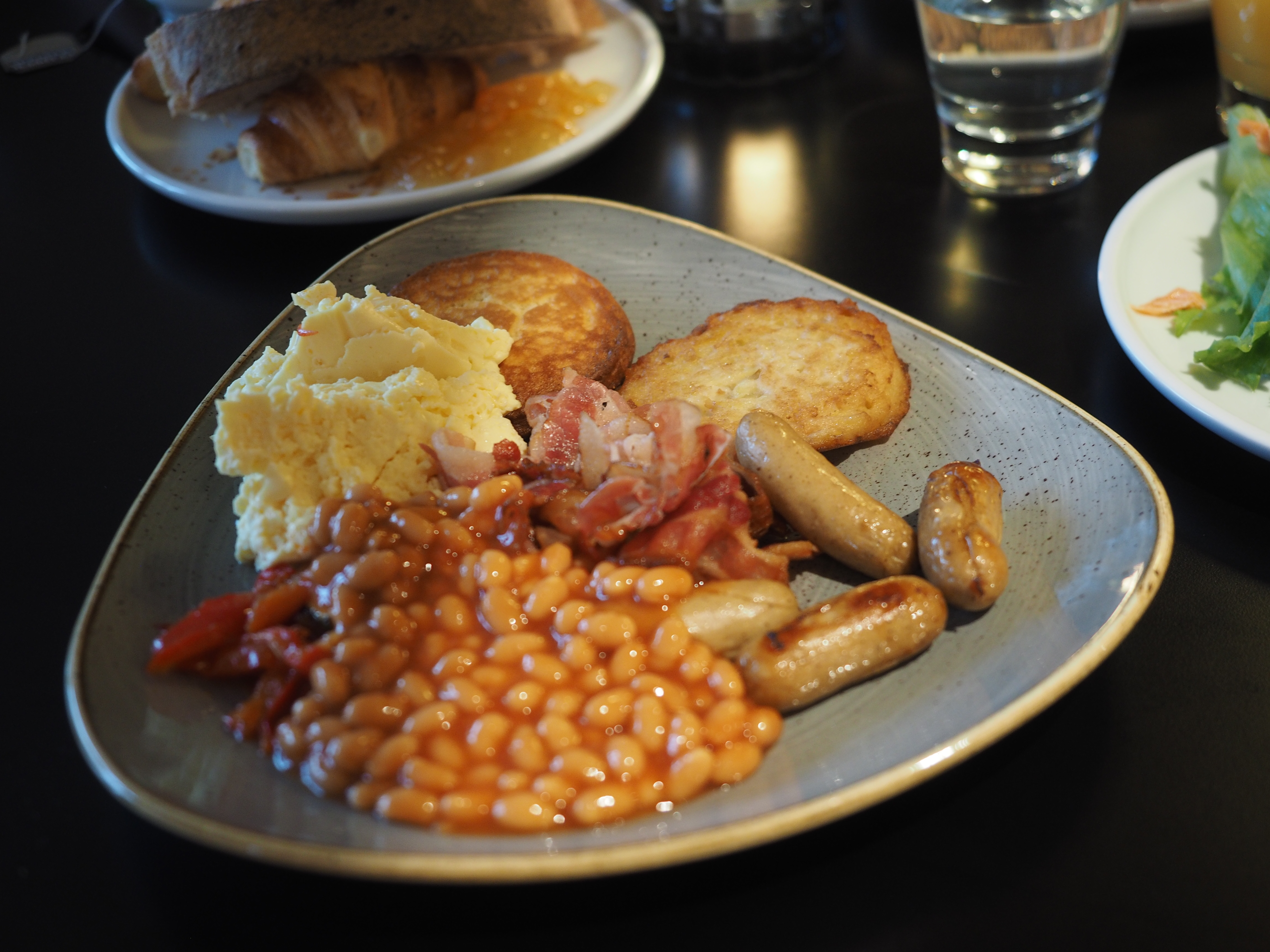
Most hotels in Europe offer a diverse breakfast buffet which is included in the room price for staying guests.

Continental European breakfasts are generally lighter than in the United States of America or the United Kingdom, and apart from coffee, drinks are often cold. Bread with boiled eggs, cheese and cold meat slices (butterbrot) may be found, and pastries and preserves are normal. Muesli, a Germanic breakfast invention, is popular in many places, and fruit and fruit juices are common. Coffee or tea are near-universal.

The apparent lightness of continental breakfast compared to much of the rest of the world and especially the full English breakfast may come from medieval times when breakfast was disapproved of by many clerical and medical writers.

In southeast Europe, in countries such as Bulgaria, Bosnia, Montenegro, North Macedonia and parts of Croatia breakfast usually consists of various kinds of savory or sweet pastry, with cheese, meat or jam filling. The most typical breakfast consists of two slices of burek and a glass of yogurt. Breakfast also often consists of open sandwiches. The sandwich is spread with butter, with toppings added such as prosciutto and yellow cheese.

=== Continental breakfast ===
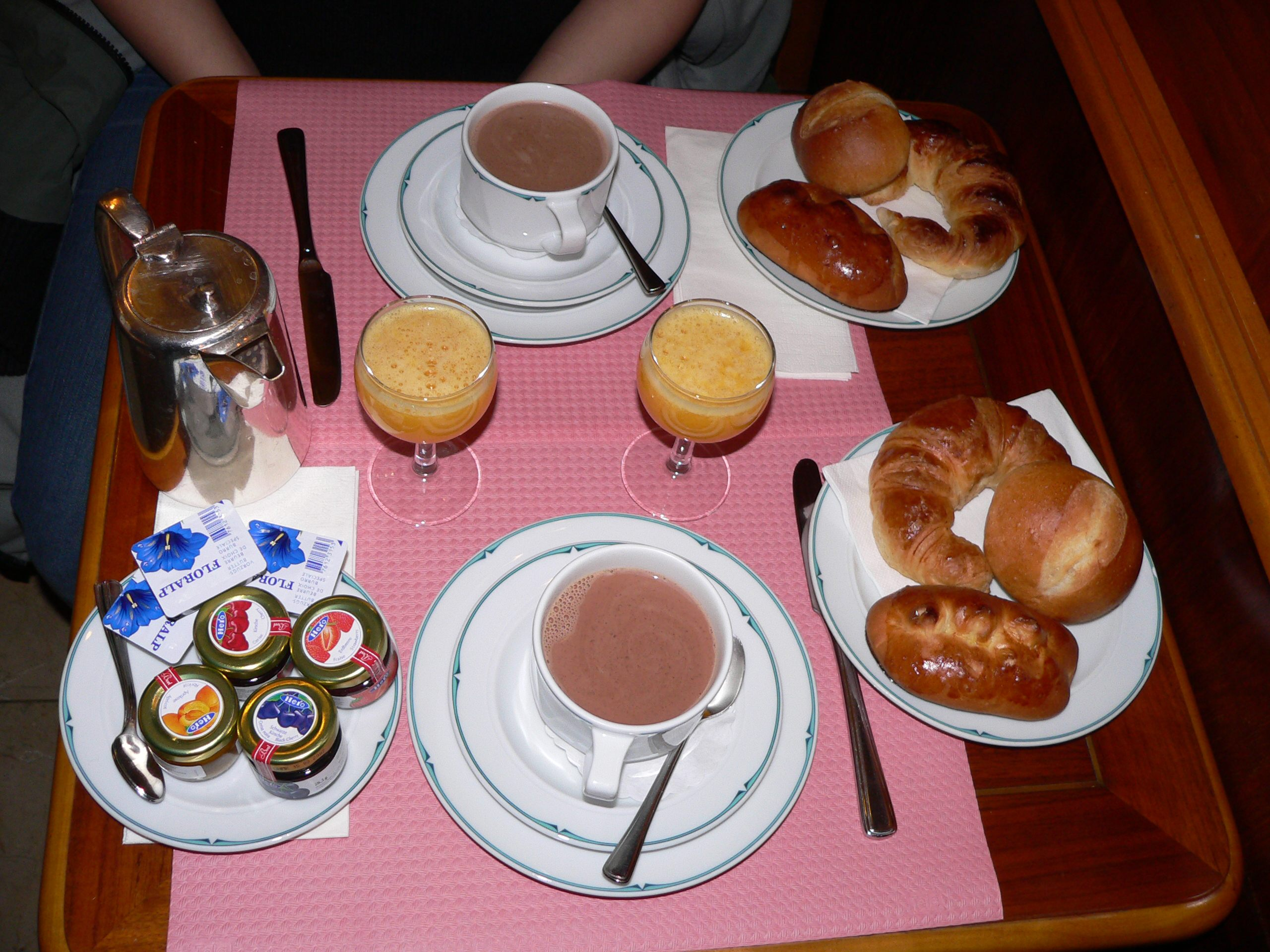
A "continental breakfast" for two people

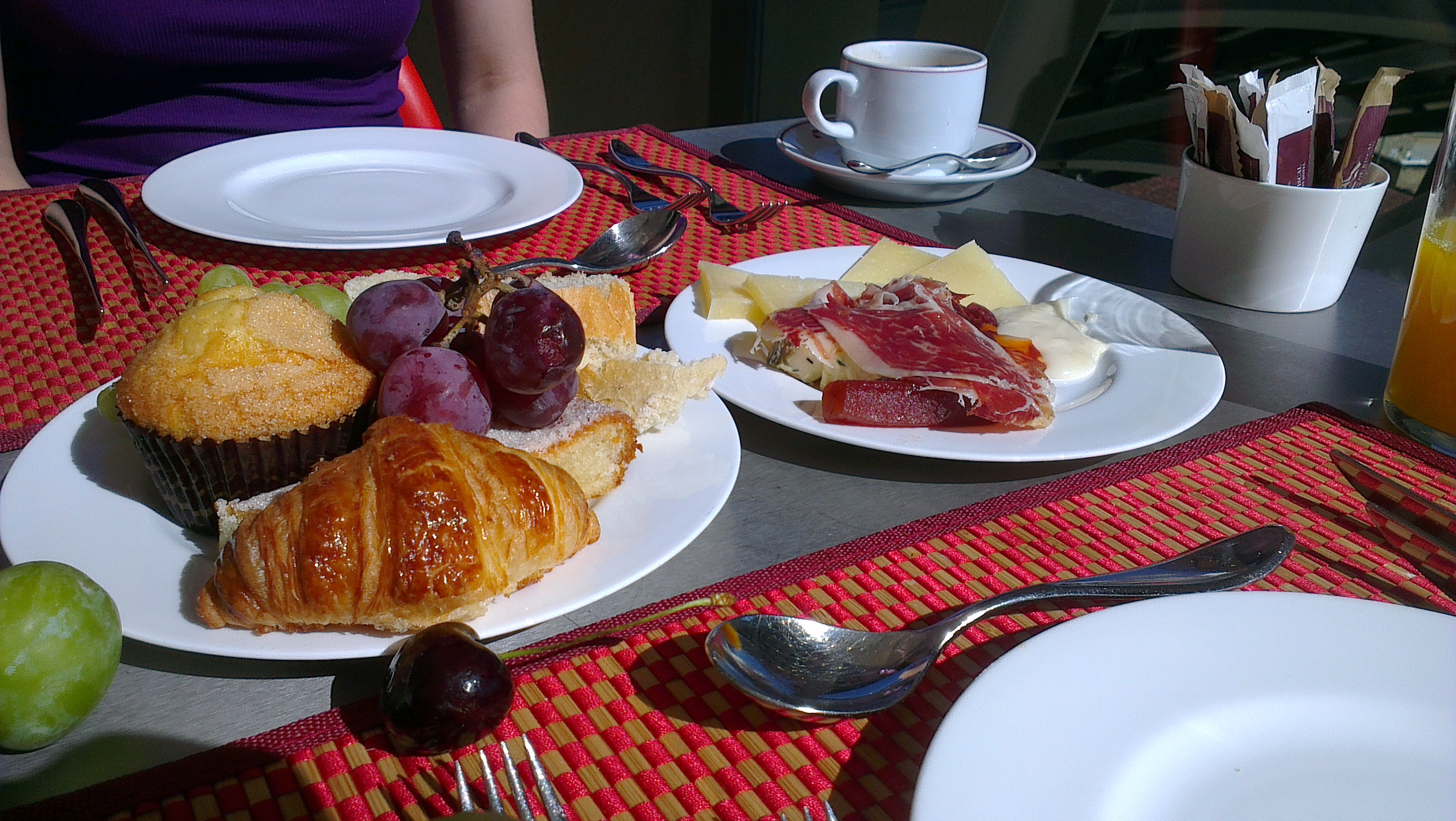
A continental breakfast of muffins, croissants and bread, fruit, slices of cheese and meat

The continental breakfast is a variant of lighter European styles, developed in English-speaking countries by the hotel industry. A continental breakfast usually includes items chosen because they are shelf-stable, and can be served in portion sizes that are appropriate for large groups of people. Typical items include coffee, tea, fruit juice, fruit, baked goods such as bread, muffins, and pastries, along with packets of butter and jam, and cold milk and cereal.

Other possible items include instant oatmeal packets, toast, and pancakes and waffles. The hospitality industry's continental breakfast is influenced by cuisine in France and the Mediterranean, whose breakfasts are lighter and more delicate than the typical full English breakfast, which tends to consist of a large plate of eggs, bacon, sausage, toast, beans, and roasted mushrooms and tomatoes, and American breakfasts featuring eggs, preserved meats, pancakes, potatoes, and toast.

The term originated in America in the late-19th century, first used in 1896 public hygiene book The Sanitarian, a New York published volume with American born Agrippa Nelson Bell as its editor, in which "continental" refers to mainland Europe. The idea itself had been around for a few decades as American hotels endeavored to appeal to the changing tastes of the emerging middle class and European travelers visiting the United States. Economy and limited service hotels, which may not have a full restaurant, often include continental breakfast as part of the room price. Continental breakfasts are also more cost-effective for the establishments serving them, because they require fewer staff to prepare and serve them.

=== Albania ===
In Albania, the breakfast often consists of a scone, milk, tea, eggs, jam or cheese. Meat is not preferred, except for seafood such as canned sardines or tuna which is typically served with condiments such as mustard or mayonnaise. Whole grain cereals and pastries are mostly consumed by children. A shot of raki may be added to coffee as in the Italian Caffè corretto.

=== Croatia ===
In Croatia, the base is a continental breakfast with a variety of pastries with or without fillings (marmalade, chocolate, cheese, ham, nuts, poppy) and fermented milk products (yogurt, soured milk, soured cream). Cold cuts, such as prosciutto, ham, salami, kulen, bacon, and various cheeses, are also favored. Fried eggs or omelet and Vienna sausage with mayonnaise, mustard or ajvar are very often consumed. In continental parts sir i vrhnje (cottage cheese with soured cream and some spices) is traditional. Coffee is much preferred over tea (mostly herbal tea).

=== Denmark ===
A typical breakfast in Denmark consists of slices of rye bread (rugbrød) with yellow cheese, a soft-boiled egg – or more rarely – ham, salami or liver spread (leverpostej), or it may consist of breakfast cereals such as oatmeal or corn flakes, with yogurt being a popular alternative. White bread or bread rolls (rundstykker) are eaten with yellow cheese and different kinds of jams, usually made from berries or citrus fruits, and other toppings, all accompanied by coffee or tea.

Weekends or festive occasions may call for Danish pastries (wienerbrød), chocolate, or a shot of bitters, such as Gammel Dansk.

=== Finland ===
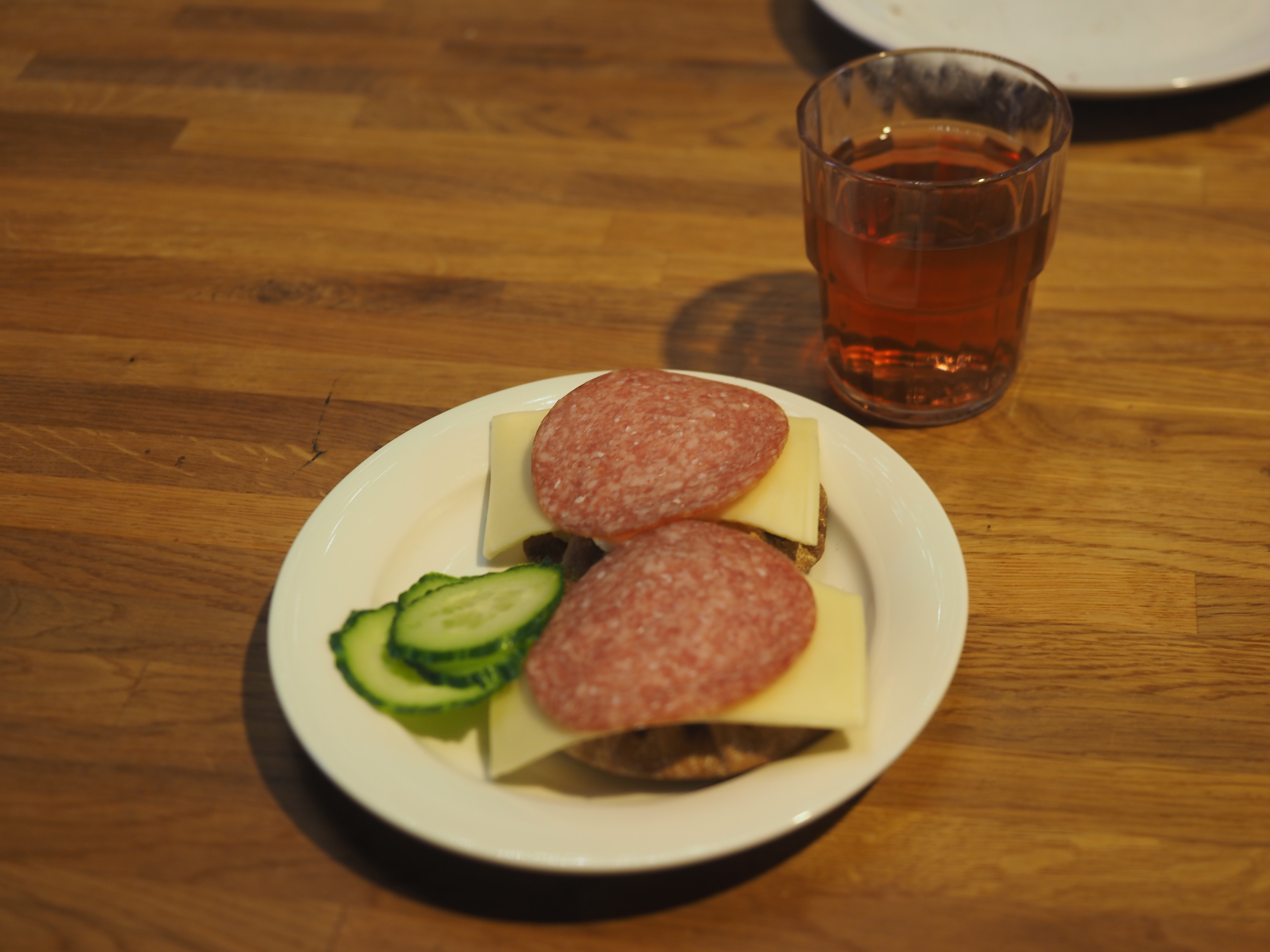
A Karelian pastry with cheese and sausage for breakfast

Breakfast usually consists of coffee or tea with open sandwiches. The sandwich is often buttered, with toppings such as hard cheese or cold cuts. Finns usually do not have sweets on their breads such as jam or chocolate. Sour milk products such as yogurt or viili are also common breakfast foods, usually served in a bowl with cereals such as corn flakes, muesli, and sometimes with sugar, fruit, or jam. Oatmeal or mixed grain porridge may also be served, usually topped with butter.

=== France ===
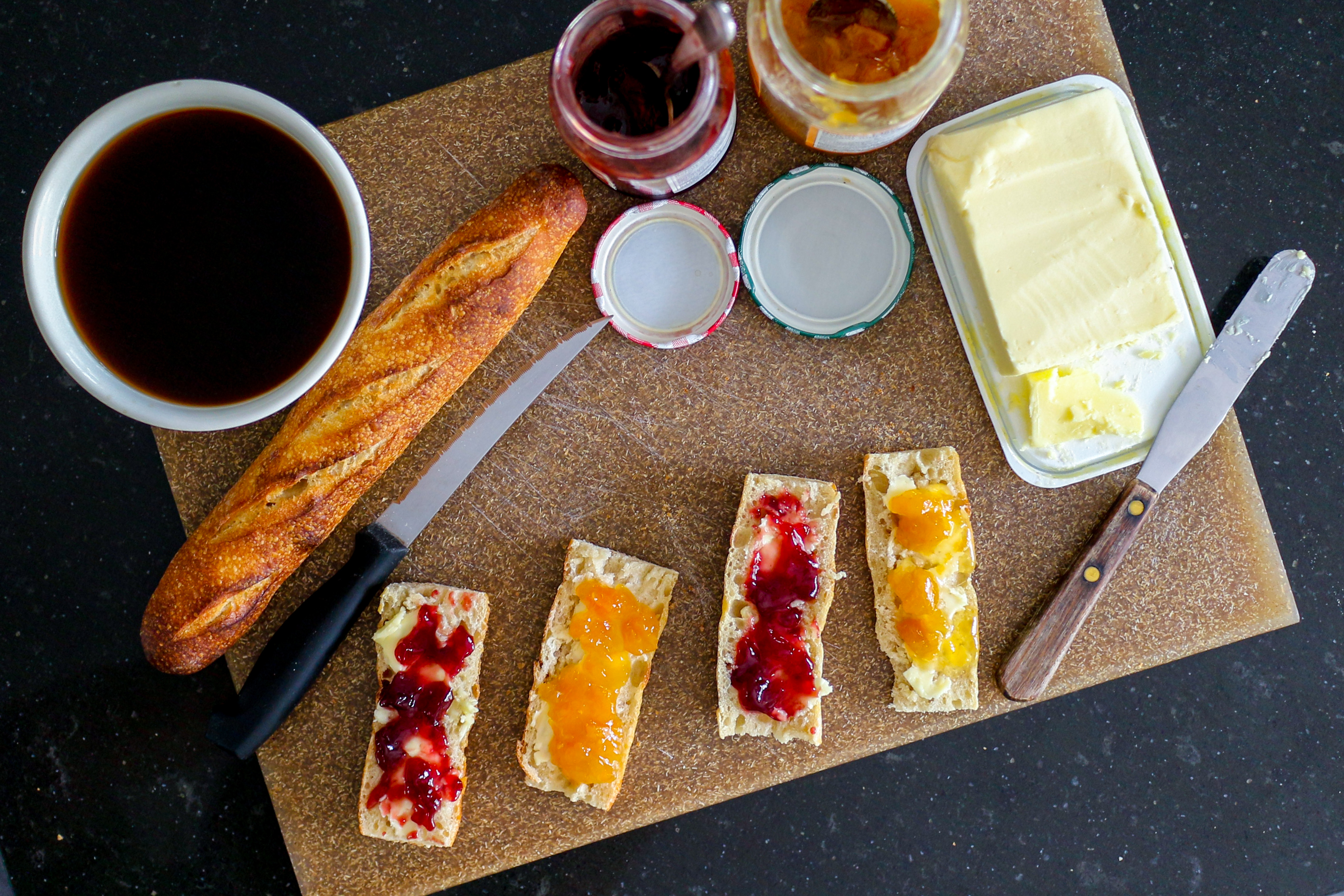
A traditional French breakfast of tartines and a bowl of coffee

In France, a typical domestic breakfast consists of a cup, often a small bowl, of coffee, generally café au lait, or hot chocolate, sometimes accompanied by a glass of orange or grapefruit juice. The main food consists of sweet products such as tartines (slices of buttered baguette or other breads spread with butter, jam, or chocolate paste), sometimes dunked in the hot drink. Brioches, pain viennois and other sweeter breads and pastries such as croissants, pains au chocolat and pains aux raisins are also traditional, but more of a weekend special treat. Other products such as breakfast cereals, fruit compote, fromage blanc, and yogurt are becoming increasingly common. A traditional French breakfast does not include any savory products, but breakfast buffets in hotels often include ham, cheese, and eggs. French people do not usually eat from plates at breakfast, preferring to savor their croissants or tartines over a bowl of hot chocolate.

French children often eat tartines and drink orange juice or hot chocolate for breakfast.

=== Germany and Austria ===
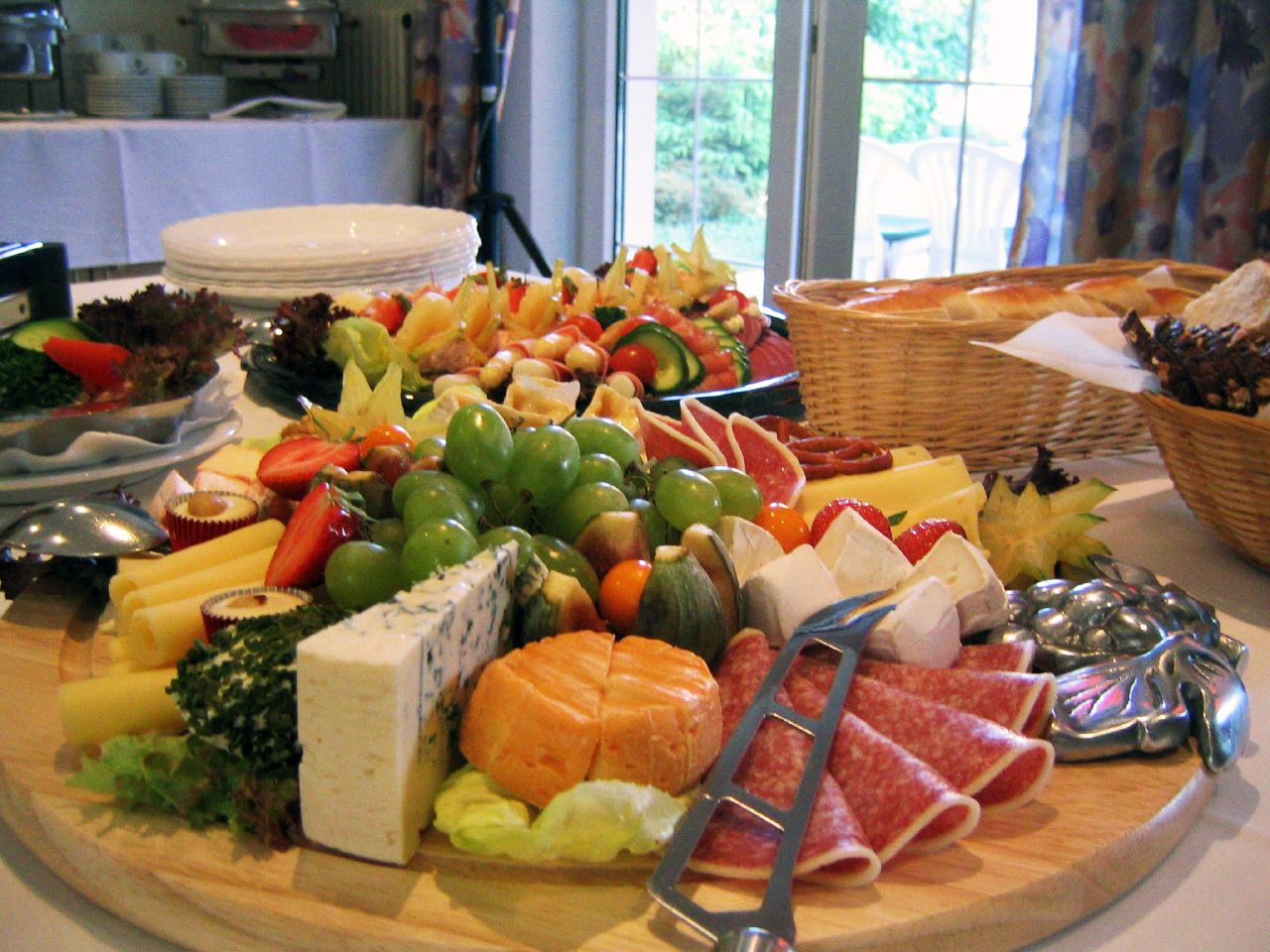
German breakfast foods

The typical German breakfast consists of bread or bread rolls, butter, jam, ham, cheeses, meat spreads, cold cuts, hard- or soft-boiled eggs, and coffee or tea. Cereals have become popular, and regional variation is significant. Yogurt, granola, and fruit (fresh or stewed) may appear, as well as eggs cooked to order (usually at smaller hotels or bed-and-breakfasts). A second breakfast is traditional in parts of Germany, notably Bavaria where it is called "Brotzeit" (literally "bread time").

=== Greece ===
Home breakfasts in Greece include bread with butter, honey, or marmalade with coffee or milk. Breakfast cereals are also eaten. Children may eat Nutella type cream on bread. No breakfast at all is common. Various kinds of savoury pastry (Tyropita, spanakopita, and bougatsa) are also eaten for breakfast, also by those eating out, usually accompanied with Greek coffee or Frappé coffee.

Traditional Greek breakfast (hot milk, fresh bread, butter and honey, or yogurt) was also available in special "milk shops" (in Greek Galaktopoleia – Γαλακτοπωλεία γαλακτοπωλείο). Milk shops were phased out between 1970 and 1990 – there are very few left, one is in Athens, and some exist in small towns.

=== Hungary ===
In Hungary, people usually have a large breakfast. Hungarian breakfast is typically an open sandwich made with fresh bread or toast, butter, cheese or different cream cheeses, túró cheese or körözött (Liptauer cheese spread), cold cuts such as ham, liver pâté (called májkrém, or kenőmájas), bacon, salami, beef tongue, mortadella, disznósajt (head cheese), and different Hungarian sausages or kolbász. Eggs (fried, scrambled or boiled), French toast called bundás kenyér and vegetables (such as peppers, bell peppers, tomatoes, radishes, scallions, and cucumber) may also form part of a Hungarian breakfast. Sometimes a simple breakfast will consist of a cup of milk, tea, or coffee taken with one or more pastries, bread rolls (including crescent-shaped kifli), toast, other pastries with different fillings (sweet and savory), butter, jam, or honey and a bun or a strudel or cereal like muesli, yogurt, kefir, and perhaps fruit.

=== Iceland ===
A typical Icelandic breakfast in 1900 included oatmeal porridge, skyr, black pudding, rye bread, and coffee.

In modern times, oatmeal porridge and orange juice are popular but the most common breakfast is a simple combination of bread and coffee. In 1995, over 90% of people had soured milk or skyr for breakfast with added cereal, notably Cheerios or corn flakes. Around 2000, Iceland was the world leader in Cocoa Puffs chocolate cereal consumption. Cod liver oil is commonly had with breakfast as a dietary supplement.

=== Italy ===
The modern breakfast in Italy often consists of a caffè latte (hot coffee with milk) with bread or rolls, butter and jam – known as prima colazione or just colazione. Fette biscottate (a cookie-like hard bread often eaten with hazelnut chocolate spread or butter and jam) and biscotti (cookies) are commonly eaten. Hot coffee may be sometimes replaced by hot tea, depending on personal taste. Children often drink hot chocolate, plain milk, hot milk with barley coffee, or hot milk with very little coffee. Cereals, yogurt, and fruit juices are also common. If breakfast is eaten in a bar (coffee shop), it is composed of cappuccino and cornetto (frothed hot milk with coffee and a pastry).

=== Latvia ===
Typical Latvian breakfast usually consists of open sandwiches with toppings made of vegetables, fish, eggs, or cheese. As in Finland, they are often buttered with margarine. Curd mixed with vegetables and salt as well as other sour milk products are very popular as well. Very often light oat porridge is eaten too. In general, light, sour, and salty tasting food is common for morning meal. Latvians usually drink coffee for breakfast.

=== Malta ===
On the island of Malta, breakfast integrates both British and continental elements. Usually, the Maltese start their day with a bowl of cereal mixed with milk, sometimes with a cup of coffee or tea. Marmalade/jams or even chocolate spreads are also common on bread or toast. Today, cereal bars are also becoming a common type of breakfast on the island. However, it is still quite common to eat traditional pastries for breakfast, usually heartier ones, such as, Pastizz. The traditional English breakfast of eggs, sausages, and fried bacon was also popular among the Maltese, especially on Sundays, due to the strong British influence on the island, but this has diminished almost completely, as locals have rediscovered a more Mediterranean and continental diet over the recent years. Hotels usually serve both a continental as well as a full English breakfast. Prayers are often said before breakfast in order to bless the meal.

=== Netherlands and Belgium ===
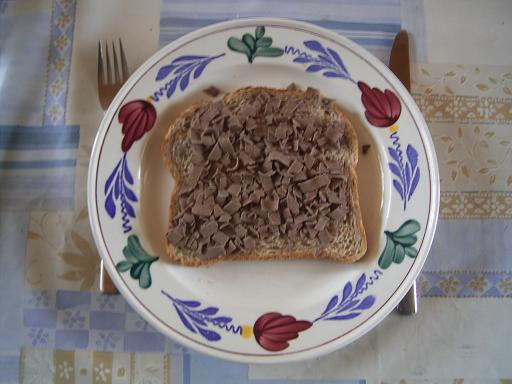
A sandwich with vlokken

For breakfast (ontbijt), the Dutch and Belgians typically eat sliced bread with butter or margarine and various choices of toppings: dairy products (numerous variations of cheese), a variety of cured and sliced meats, or sweet or semi-sweet products such as jam, syrup (from sugar beets or fruit), honey, Kokosbrood (a coconut product that is served thinly sliced like sliced cheese) or peanut butter. Another type of sweet toppings are the chocolate toppings; the Dutch have chocolate toppings in all variations: hagelslag (chocolate sprinkles), chocoladevlokken (chocolate flakes) (both typically Dutch), and chocoladepasta (chocolate spread). Children may eat chocolate-topped bread or colorful fairy bread, which is called vruchtenhagel. Tea, dripolator coffee, milk, and juice are the most popular breakfast beverages. Breakfast may also include raisin bread and fried or boiled eggs. On special occasions, such as Easter, Christmas, Mother's Day etc., breakfast is usually the same, but with a wider range of choices (i.e. premium cheeses, special ham, hot buns, croissants etc.).

A 2012 opinion poll concluded that the Dutch believe that breakfast should be a more important meal than it is and that more time should be spent on it; almost three-quarters of those polled ate their sandwiches in less than fifteen minutes, and blame for an all-too quick breakfast was placed on "fast" breakfast products. A perfect "weekend breakfast" for the Dutch contained coffee or tea, fresh-baked bread rolls (and croissants), and a boiled egg. The poll also concluded that men are more interested than women in having breakfast with their partner.

=== Norway ===
80% of Norwegians eat breakfast (frokost) daily, mostly at home. The most common breakfast is open sandwiches (smørbrød), often whole wheat bread, with cheese, often Jarlsberg, Norvegia or brunost, cold cuts, leverpostei, jam, mackerel in tomato sauce, etc. Common drinks are water, filter coffee, milk and juice. Another common breakfast is breakfast cereals like corn flakes eaten with milk, kulturmelk, or yogurt. Whole-grain porridges (primarily oatmeal) with regular milk or butter are also eaten by some. More ample breakfasts may include fish, a diverse array of cheese, eggs, bacon, breads, and hot and cold cereals eaten in various combinations. Pastries bought on the go, such as croissants or pain au chocolat have become increasingly common since the 1990s; as have vegan alternatives and replacements to traditional spreads.

=== Poland ===
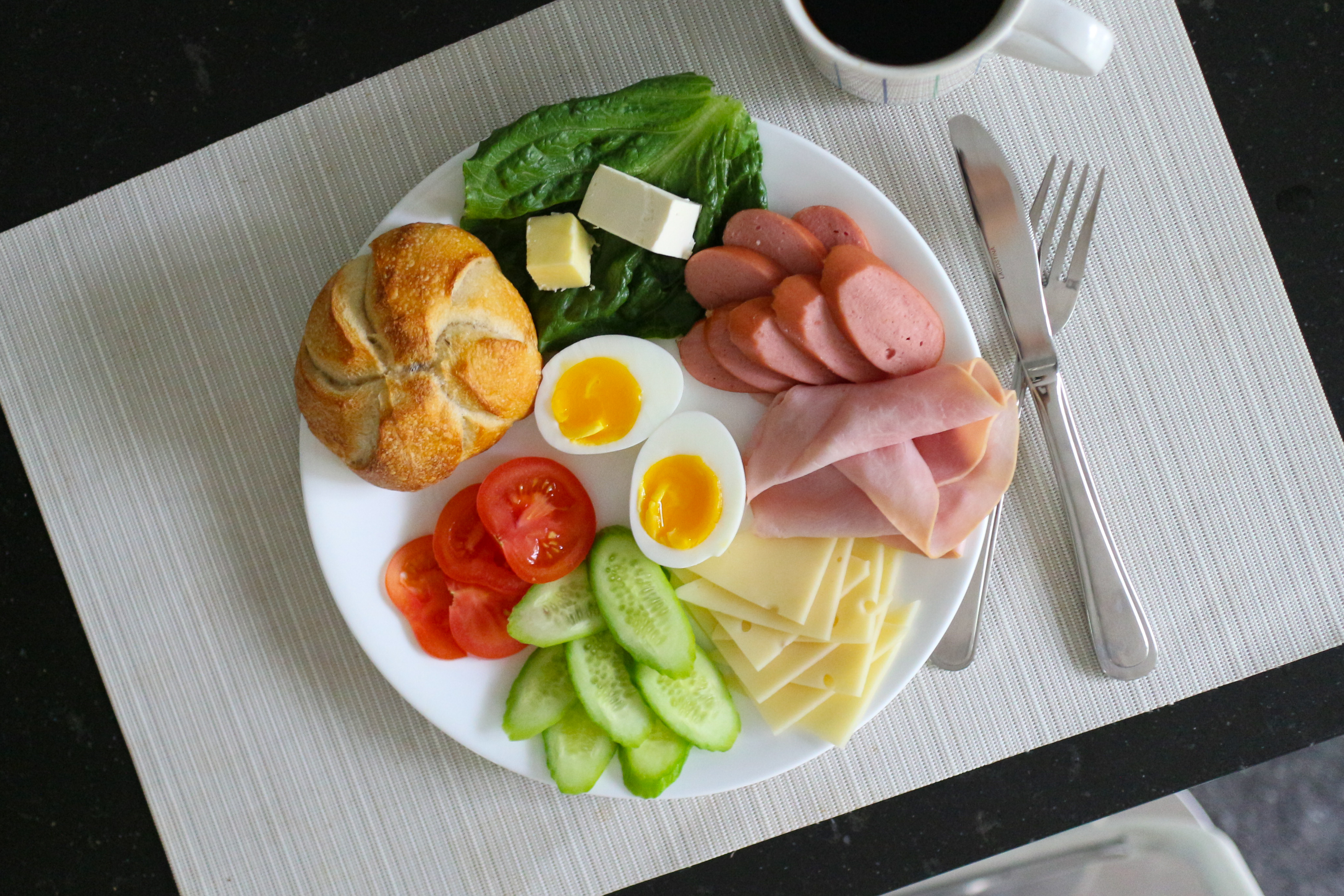
Polish breakfast

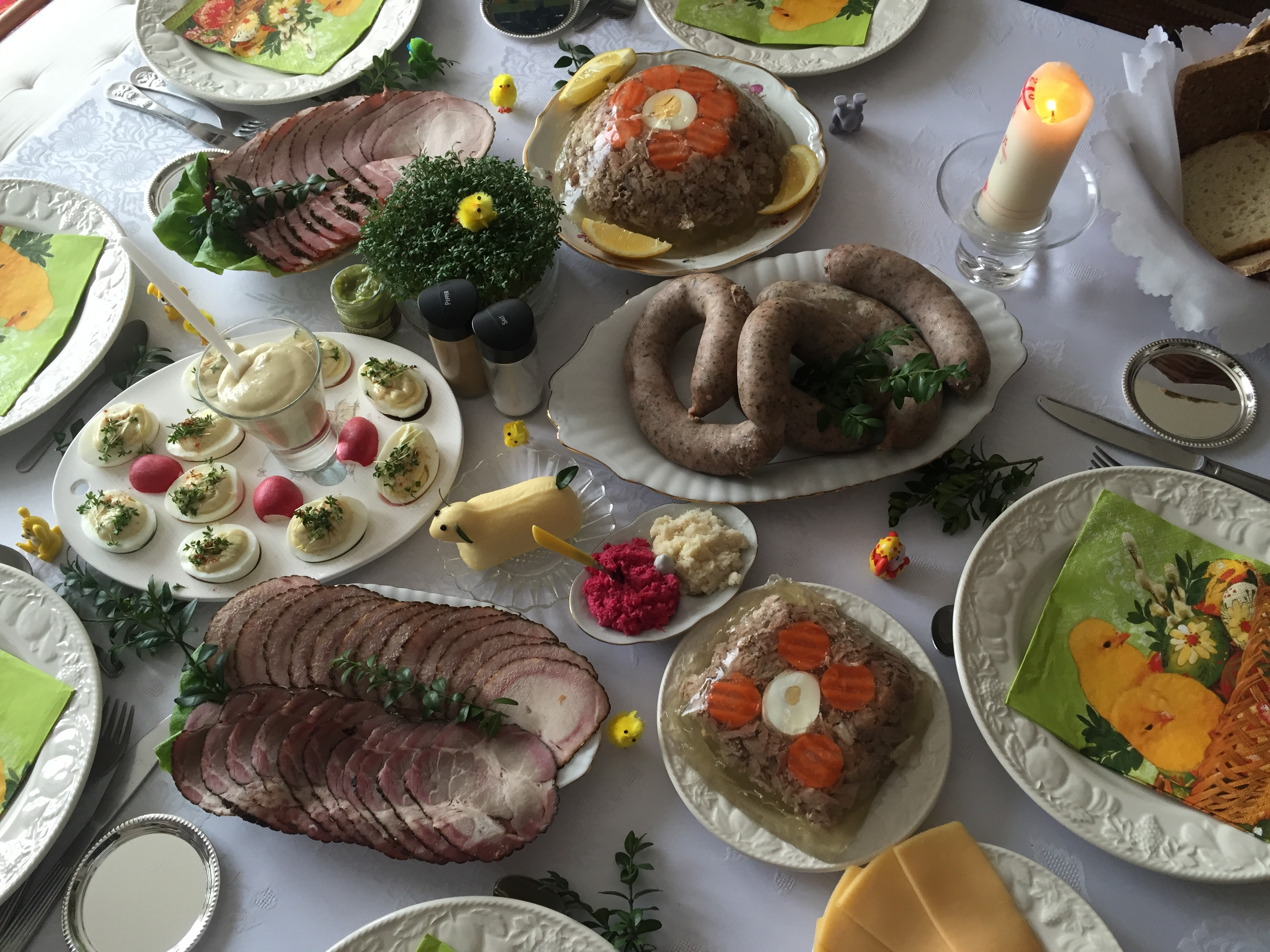
Polish Easter breakfast

The traditional Polish breakfast is a large spread with a variety of sides eaten with bread or toast. Sides include various cold cuts, meat spreads, the Polish sausage, tomatoes, cheese, and sliced pickles. Twaróg, a Polish white cheese, is a breakfast staple and comes in many forms. Twaróg can be eaten plain, with salt, sugar, or honey, or it can be mixed with chives into a cream cheese-like spread. Eggs are served often as the main breakfast item, mostly soft-boiled or scrambled. For a quick winter breakfast, hot oatmeal, to which cocoa is sometimes added, is often served. Jam spreads are popular for a quick breakfast, including plum, raspberry, and black or red currant spreads. Breakfast drinks include coffee, milk, hot cocoa, or tea. Traditionally, Poles avoid heavy-cooked foods for breakfast. For the most part, one will not see fried meats or potatoes in a classic Polish breakfast. Emphasis is placed on a large variety of foods to satisfy everyone at the breakfast table.

=== Romania ===
The traditional Romanian breakfast is milk, tea or coffee alongside (toasted) bread with butter or margarine and on top of it, honey or fruit jams or preserves. Sometimes the buttered bread is served savory instead of sweet, in which case the Romanians add cured meats, salami, or cheese. Another option is to spread on a slice of bread some liver pâté. In recent years, Romanians have also started to serve cereal with dried fruits and milk instead of the traditional breakfast, though that is not yet very widespread. According to a 2014 study, 35% of Romanians eat cooked dishes such as omelet or fried eggs and 15% eat sandwiches. Most people drink coffee and 67% serve Turkish coffee (made in an ibrik), though more and more people are starting to use drip or filter coffee. While crêpes served with fruit preserves, jams, or cheese have traditionally been served as desserts, in recent years, more Romanians have started to have them as breakfast during weekends.

=== Russia ===
Traditional Russian breakfasts are concentrated on kashas, or porridges – the most important staple in Russian nutritional culture, with buckwheat and oat, as well as semolina, serving as the three most important bases of such dishes, usually cooked using water or milk, as well as consumed with or without milk. Breakfast foods also include pancakes (oladushki). Oladushki are made from flour and rise on yeast. Blini, or crepes, are also popular for breakfast and are also made with flour, but without yeast. Sirniki, is a cheese form of pancake. Sirniki are made of tvorog (quark cheese), which can be eaten separately with honey for breakfast. Also, a popular dish is buterbrod, open sandwiches with cold cuts and cheeses.

=== Serbia ===
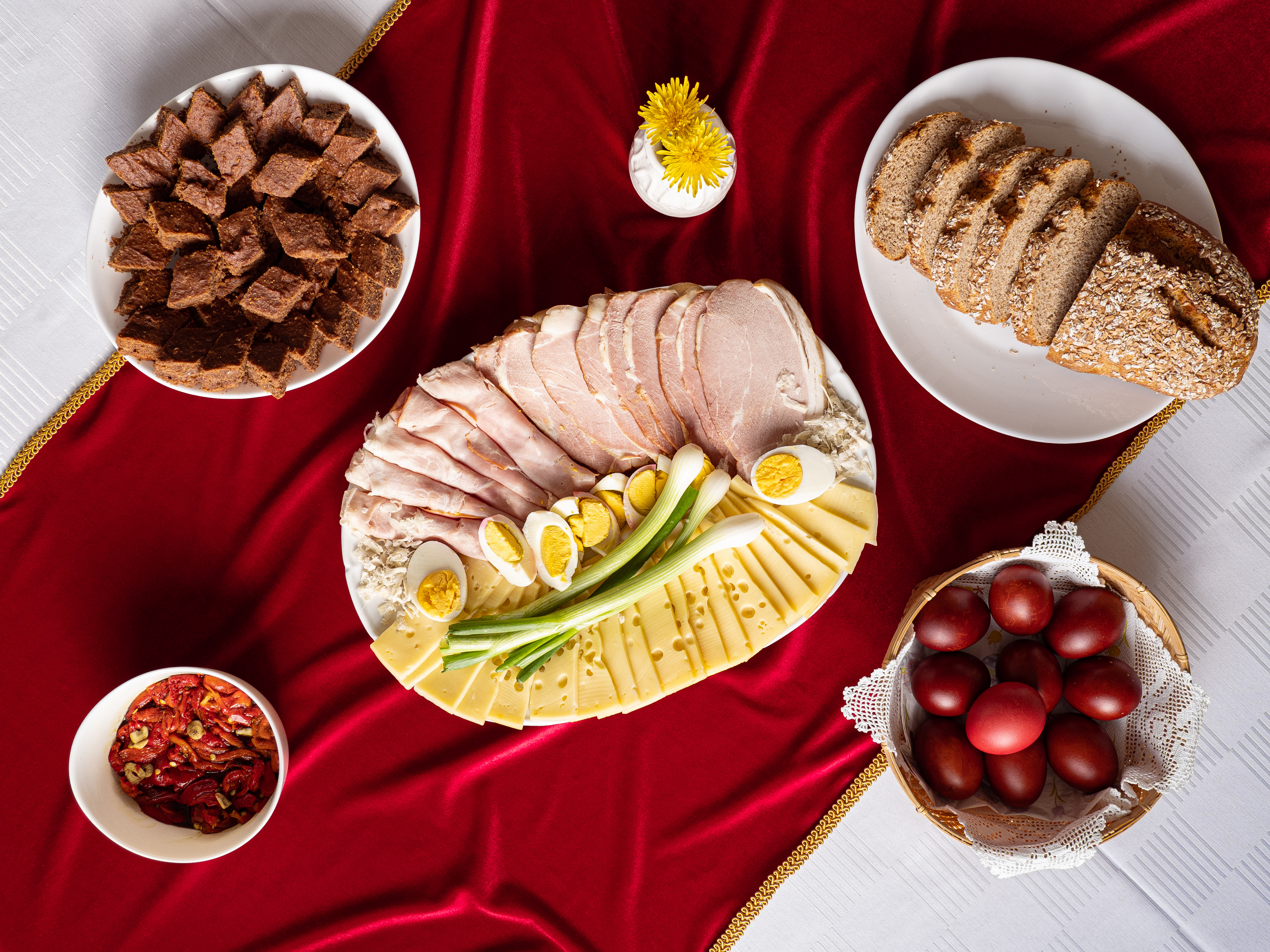
Typical Easter breakfast in Serbia

In Serbia, breakfast may include eggs in different forms (e.g. omelet with bacon, onion and feta cheese), canned fish or opened sandwiches with prosciutto, ham, bacon, salami, feta cheese, Serbian traditional cheese and salad (e.g. pickles) filled with sour cream or mayonnaise. Serbian traditional products such as kajmak and ajvar are also very popular. Fried mushrooms are also very popular for breakfast. Different types (e.g. proja, gibanica, burek) are also served as the main dish.Bakery products such as pogačica, kiflice, projarice and paštete are ofently eaten. Yogurt, coffee, milk and tea are preferred breakfast drinks.

=== Spain ===
In central Spain, breakfast is generally sweet. Coffee (usually with milk) or Cola Cao are the standard drink, perhaps together with orange juice, is enjoyed with biscuits, magdalenas (a Spanish version of the French madeleine made with oil instead of butter), sweet buns, or toast with butter and jam. On weekends or in cafés, it is not unusual for people to have thick hot chocolate with churros, which are extruded sticks of doughnut-like dough with a star-shaped profile covered in sugar. Savoury breakfast is more common along the North and Mediterranean coasts. This, still consists of coffee or chocolate and toast with a choice of olive oil and salt, tomato and olive oil, pâté, jamón serrano (cured ham), and other options like sobrasada (a raw cured spiced sausage that is easy to spread), and, in Andalucia, pringá. Freshly squeezed orange juice is widely available in most places as an alternative for coffee.

=== Sweden ===
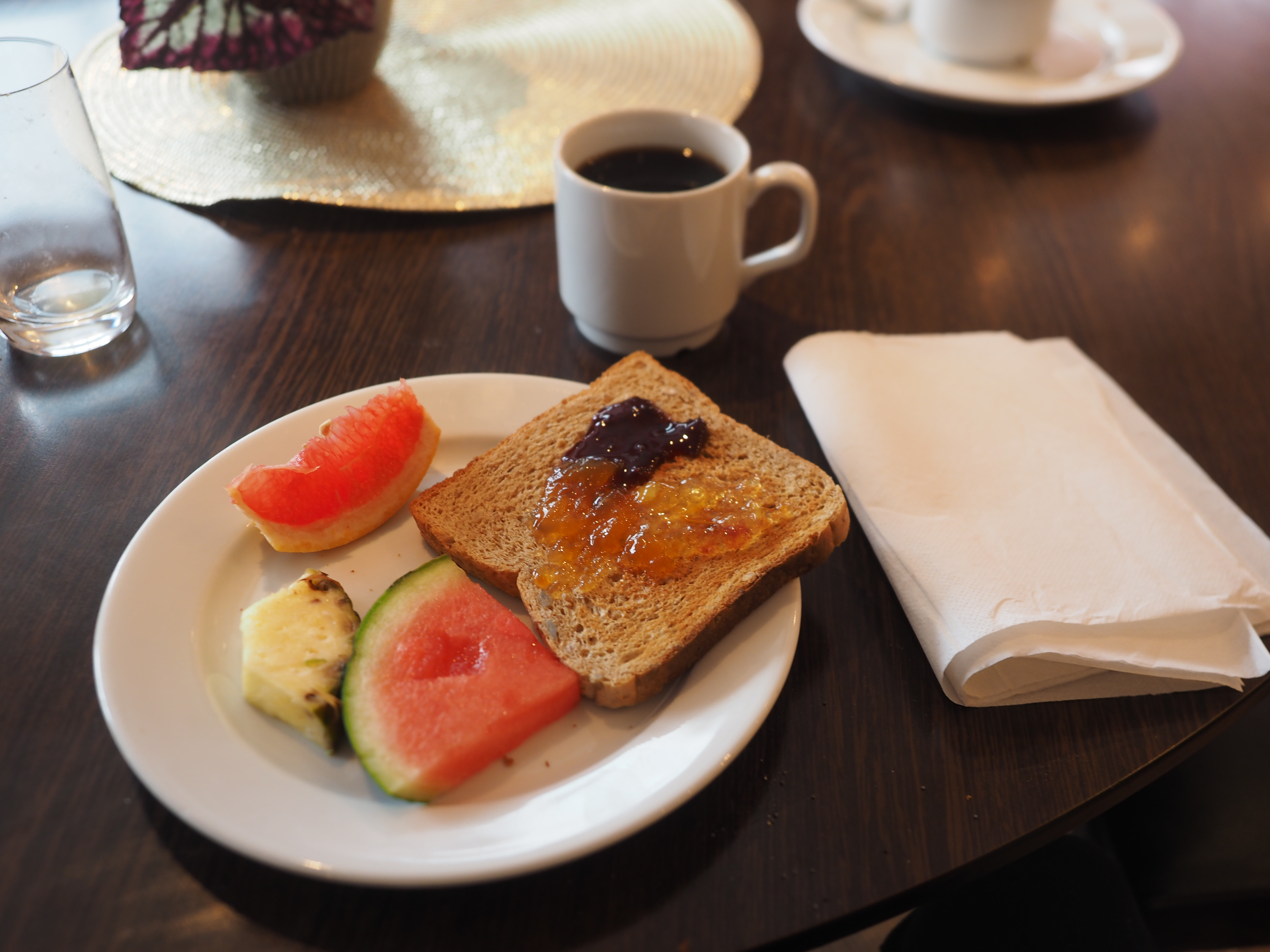
Toast with jelly, fresh fruit, and a cup of coffee for breakfast at a Swedish hotel

Breakfast in Sweden is usually an open sandwich of soft bread or crisp bread, cold cuts, smörgåskaviar, cheese, cottage cheese, cream cheese, eggs, scrambled or boiled, pâté (leverpastej) with pickled cucumber, tomatoes or cucumber, or a toast with marmalade or maybe honey, juices, coffee, hot chocolate or tea. Breakfast cereals or muesli with milk, yogurt or filmjölk, currants, and fruits are popular or warm whole-grain porridge with milk and jam (for example lingonberry jam). Bilberry-soup (blåbärssoppa) and rose hip soup are also possible breakfast alternatives.

=== Switzerland ===
Swiss breakfasts are often similar to those eaten in neighboring countries. Traditionally, zopf (or züpfe) is eaten on Sunday mornings and New Year's Day. A notable breakfast food of Swiss origin, now found throughout Europe, is muesli, (Birchermüesli in Swiss German), introduced in 1900 by Maximilian Bircher-Benner for patients in his hospital.

=== Turkey ===
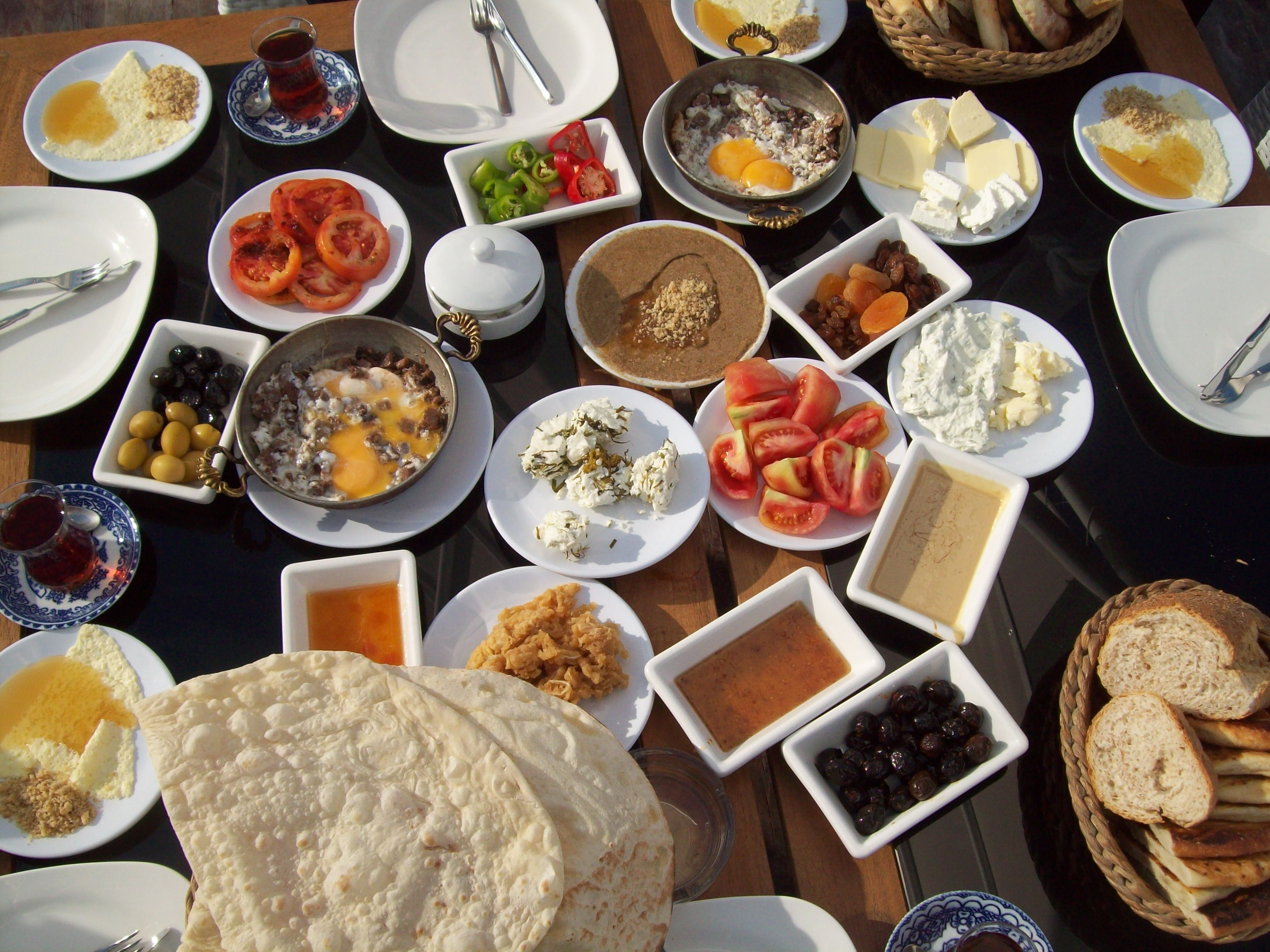
Turkish breakfast

In Turkish cuisine, a typical breakfast consists of bread, cheese (beyaz peynir, kaşar etc.), butter, olives, eggs, tomatoes, cucumbers, jam, honey, and kaymak. Sucuk (spicy Turkish sausage), pastırma, börek, simit, poğaça and soups are eaten as a morning meal in Turkey. A common Turkish specialty for breakfast is called menemen, which is prepared with tomatoes, green peppers, onion, olive oil and eggs. Various soups (çorba) are also very common and traditional for Turkish breakfast; mainly chicken broth, lentil soup, and a national delicacy, tarhana soup (Turkish cereal food consisting of flour, yogurt and vegetables fermented then dried; it is consumed as a soup by mixing it with stock or water) are most well known soups. Tripe soup, trotter soup, and sheep's head soup are also traditionally very common all over Turkey for breakfast. The Turkish word for breakfast, kahvaltı, means "before coffee," (kahve, 'coffee'; altı, 'under'). But after the First World War, during which the Ottoman Empire lost its coffee-producing territories, tea has displaced coffee as the everyday hot drink in Turkey. In the Sirkeci neighborhood of Istanbul, pide is a popular morning meal.

=== United Kingdom and Ireland ===
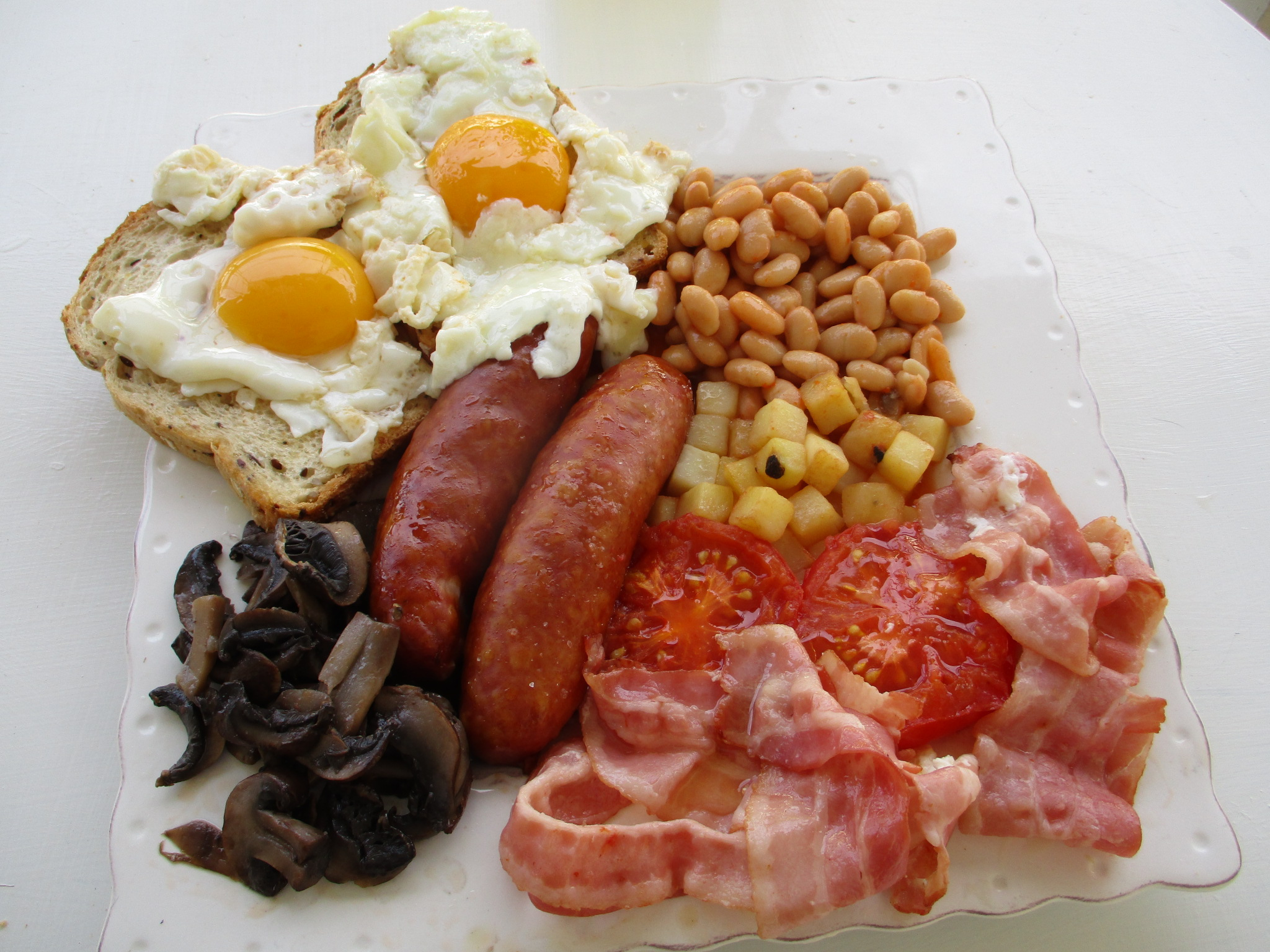
A full English breakfast with fried eggs on toast, sausage, bacon, mushrooms, baked beans, hash browns, and tomato

In the contemporary UK and Ireland, a weekday breakfast may involve a cereal dish, such as muesli, porridge or cereal, or toast or simply bread spread with jam or marmalade. Tea and coffee remain equally popular accompaniments. Marmalade, originally a Portuguese confection, had been a popular British spread to consume in the evening, before the Scots moved it to the breakfast table in the 18th century. It is however becoming very common to 'skip breakfast' entirely or take coffee or pastries on the morning commute. Portable quick snacks such as granola bars, ready-cut fruit and warm takeaway foods are becoming increasingly commonly consumed away from home and are sold at commuting points and newsagents and local shops in all urban areas.

The traditional breakfast most associated with Britain and Ireland remains, however, the full breakfast of eggs (fried, scrambled, or poached) with bacon and sausages, usually with mushrooms, tomatoes, baked beans, fried bread, black pudding or white pudding, and toast. Dating from a time when hard labour was more common, calorie intakes were necessarily higher, and servant labour was more available, it is nowadays regarded as a meal for the weekend or holidays when time is available for preparation, prepared by parents to welcome children, or as a special occasion such as a birthday or anniversary, or following a night of drinking. A healthy and nutritious version consists of grilling the protein and using poached, rather than fried, eggs, and variations based on one egg, one protein, and toast abound. It remains by far the most common choice on brunch menus and breakfast cafes across the region. The "full Scottish breakfast" tends to omit pork sausages and have beef sausages or lamb haggis instead. At its most extensive, it consists of eggs, square sausage, fried dumpling, potato scone, tomato, mushrooms, bacon beef links, and fried bread. Originating in the British Isles during the Victorian era, the full breakfast is among the most internationally recognised British dishes.

Another traditional British breakfast consists of porridge, although now associated with Scotland, it has been consumed across Britain as a staple food since at least the Middle Ages. The breakfast cereal Scott's Porage Oats was produced in Glasgow in 1880. Before the arrival of American-style breakfast cereals in the early 20th century, dried bread soaked in hot milk or tea and porridge (boiled oats) was the common daily breakfast, while leftover vegetables (often, cabbage) and potatoes not eaten the night before were often served re-fried becoming 'bubble-and-squeak'; in Ireland, the dish is known as colcannon. Traditionally, breakfast would be served with a small amount of fruit, such as a slice of orange, believed to prevent the onset of scurvy. Also traditional, but now less popular breakfasts included fish in the form of kippers (smoked herring) with poached egg and toast, and kedgeree (a Scoto-Indian smoked haddock, egg, and rice dish originating in Colonial India). Most British breakfasts are consumed with tea, coffee, or fruit juice.

In Old English, breakfast was known as morgenmete, meaning "morning meal".

A continental breakfast in UK and Irish hotels normally consists of baked goods (fresh bread, toast, pastries such as croissants or pain au chocolat etc.) slices of cheese and cold meat, cereal, yogurts, fruit and drinks like coffee, tea, or fruit juices. Although this is the traditional breakfast in parts of continental Europe, elsewhere these breakfasts are common only in the hospitality sector (particularly in economy and limited service hotels with no restaurant, as they require little preparation).

== North America ==
As with other continents around the world, breakfasts in North America vary widely between countries, including variations of both American and continental breakfasts.

=== Canada ===
Traditional Canadian breakfast foods include pork sausages, bacon, maple-cured bacon, fried potatoes, maple-infused beans, eggs, toast, cereals, pancakes (or French toast) and maple syrup, or hot oatmeal. Peameal bacon is also a Canadian breakfast food. Coffee, tea and fruit juice of many varieties are widely consumed in Canada during breakfast.

=== Costa Rica ===
In Costa Rica, the most common breakfast is called gallo pinto, made up of previously cooked rice and beans (red or black). The rice and beans are sautéed in a pan with chile, onions, culantro (an herb typical to the region) and bean stock for color. The dish is accompanied by fried egg, cheese, and fried plantain or cooking plantain. Black coffee or coffee with milk are traditional drinks. In Limón Province, gallo pinto is prepared with coconut milk instead. Chorreadas, savory sweetcorn pancakes, are another common breakfast food; they are usually accompanied by cheese or a type of sour cream called natilla.

=== Cuba ===
Breakfast in urban areas traditionally consists of café con leche that is sweetened and includes a pinch of salt. Toasted buttered Cuban bread, cut into lengths, is dunked in the coffee. In rural Cuba, farmers eat roasted pork, beans and white rice, café con leche and cuajada sweetened with caramel.

=== Dominican Republic ===
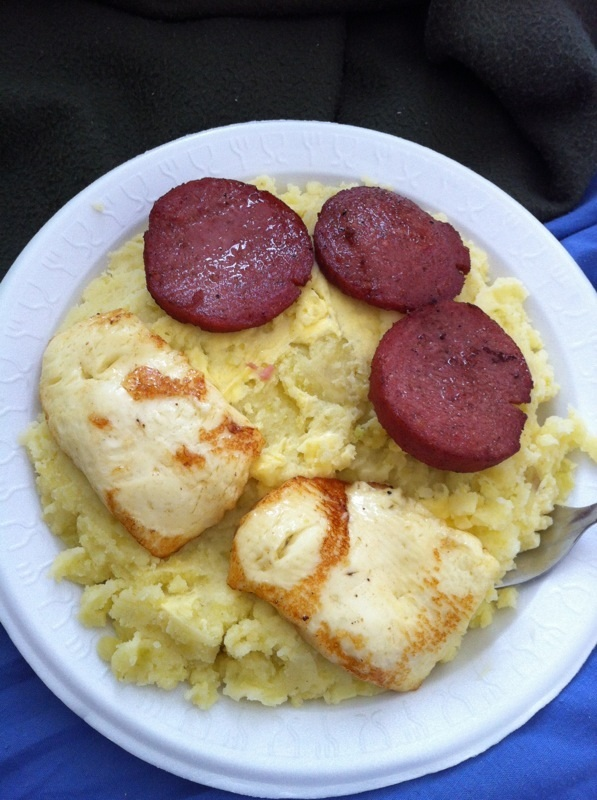
Mangú, Dominican Republic

In the Dominican Republic, breakfast varies depending on the region. In the interior of the island, it is accustomed to have breakfast with a side of vegetables, the green plantain or cooking plantain being the most popular. It is served boiled or mashed and known as mangú. In the capital, breakfast is lighter, including coffee with milk or hot chocolate, along with bread, butter, and cheese, and normally accompanied by orange juice and other juices of fruits typical to the region. Milk punch (milk, egg, nutmeg, and malt) may also be served, as may boiled eggs with harina de negrito or some other type of corn starch.

=== El Salvador ===
A typical Salvadoran breakfast comprises fried or scrambled eggs, refried beans or casamiento (rice cooked with black beans), fried plantains, cheese or crema, and thick Salvadoran-style tortillas (or bread). Sometimes sausage (chorizo) or avocado will be included on the side. Breakfast may be enjoyed with coffee or fruit juice.

=== Guatemala ===
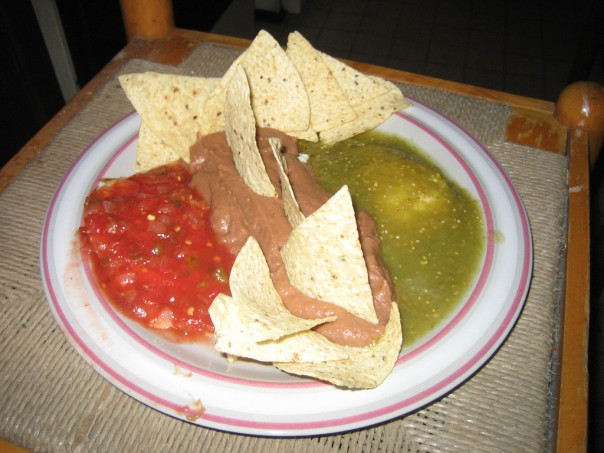
Huevos divorciados from Guatemala

In Guatemala, breakfast consists of one or two eggs either fried, scrambled, or boiled accompanied by baked/fried beans with coffee. With this comes fresh cream, fresh cheese, and fried plantains (or cooking plantain). It is common to add hot sauce made out of "chiltepes" (a type of pepper). They are prepared raw or boiled, then they are ground with some vinegar, chopped onions, and chopped cilantro to make the hot sauce. A traditional egg dish prepared with both green and red sauces is called "huevos divorciados". In the eastern part of the country, specifically in Zacapa, you can find "huevos a caballo" or (eggs on a horse) which is basically two fried eggs over roasted steak.

Other types of breakfast include milk cereals. The most common drinks are orange juice or other fruits, milk, atol (a milk pudding with chocolate), and corn starch. The coffee is normally served with sweet bread also called "pan de manteca" (or butter bread).

=== Honduras ===
In Honduras, it is typical to start the day with homemade bread, with coffee or a glass of milk. Then, a plate of food with beans, alongside eggs that can be scrambled or sunny side up, slivers of fried plantain (or cooking plantain), corn, tortillas, cheese, and butter. Versions of egg preparation vary: "estrellados" which consists of just cracking the shell, in "torta" or omelette (beaten with some salt), scrambled or boiled. Another typical breakfast are the baleadas and tortillas with cheese; sometimes they are fried together with cheese in between. In the "garífuna" culture, coffee is accompanied by "mínimo" bread (banana bread) or coconut bread.

=== Jamaica ===
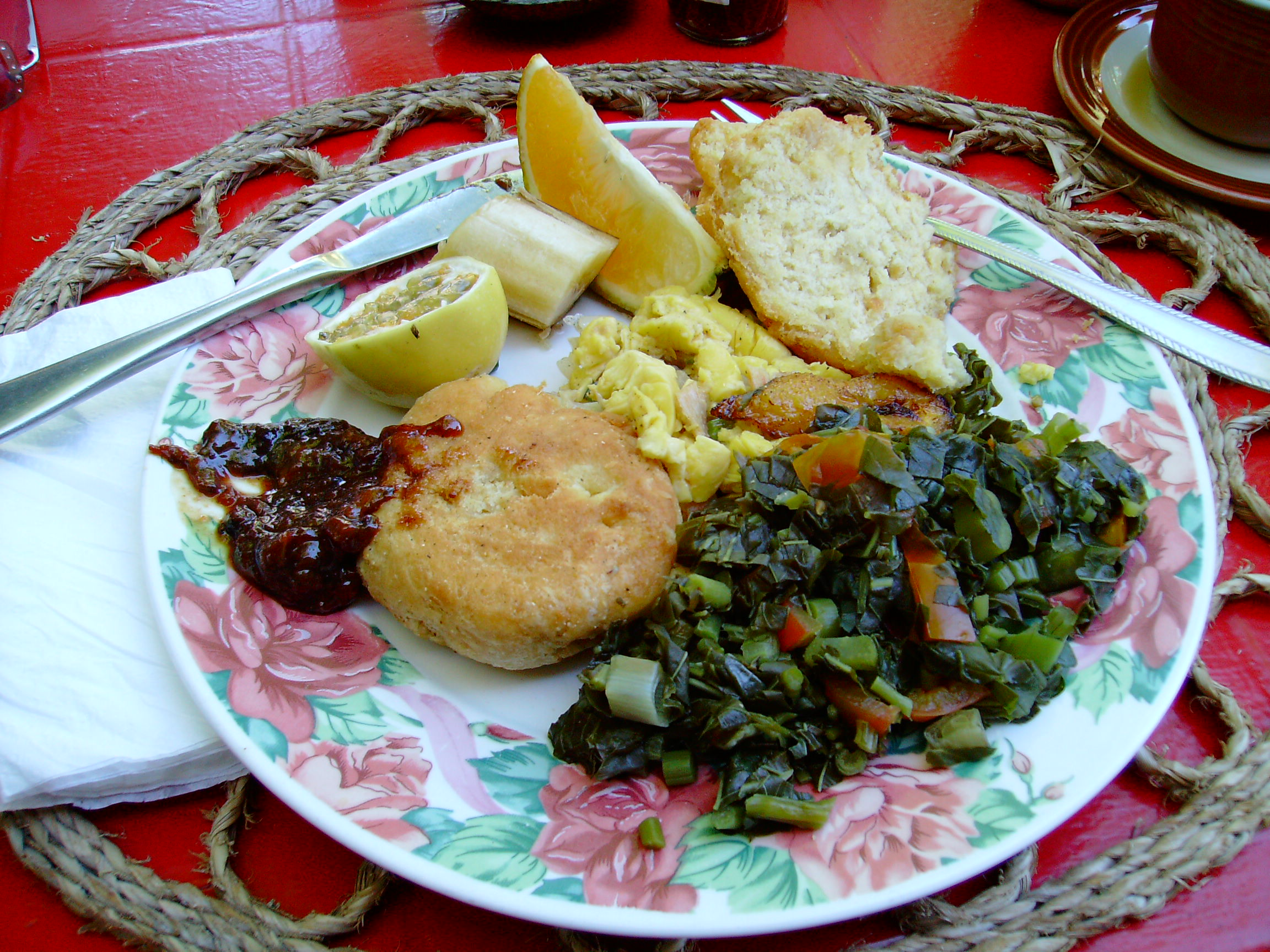
Jamaican breakfast with ackee, saltfish, and callaloo

A Jamaican breakfast includes ackee and saltfish, seasoned callaloo, boiled green bananas, and fried dumplings.

=== Mexico ===
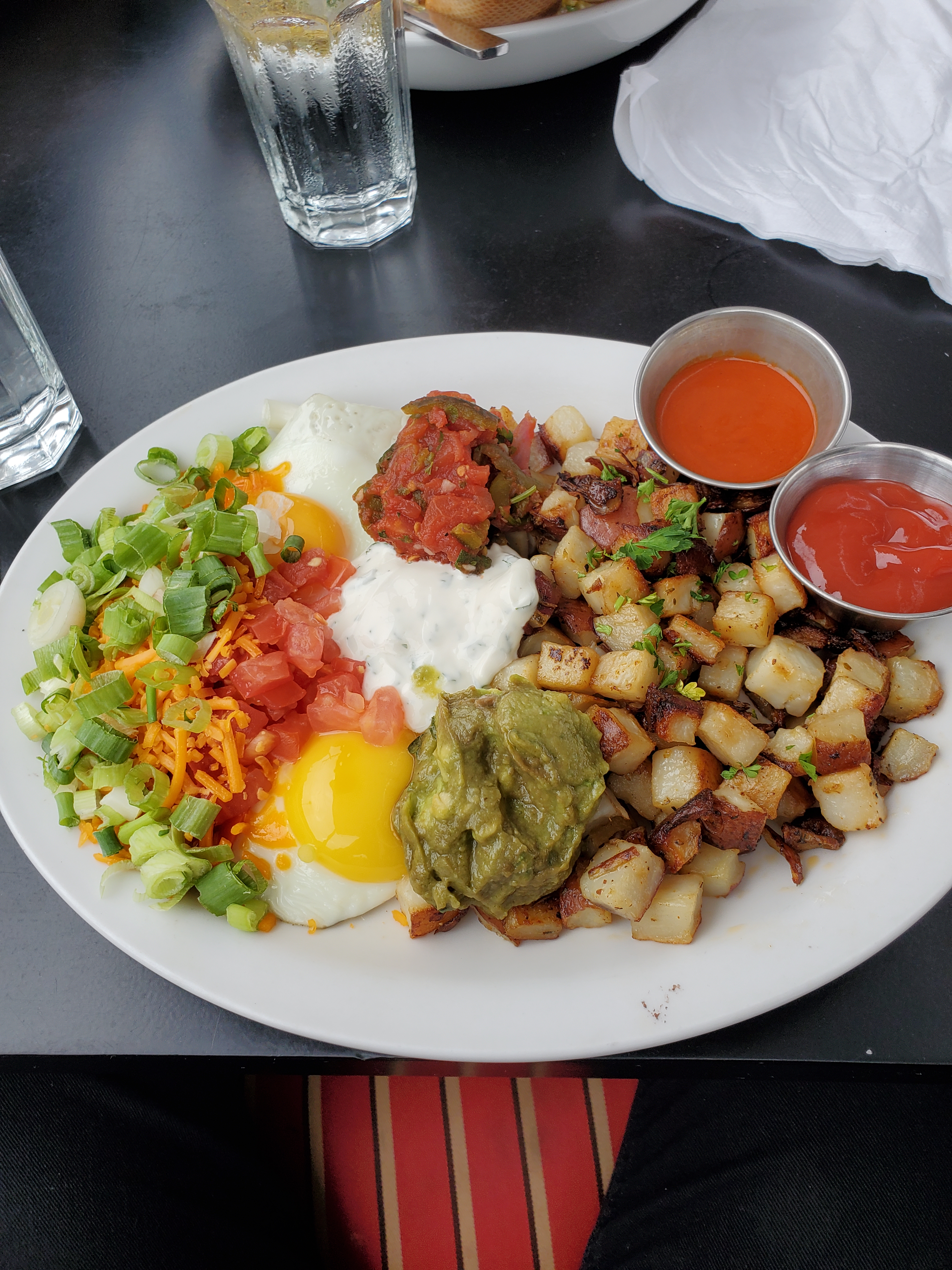
Mexican Breakfast with avocado, hash browns, and sunny side up eggs

Breakfast in Mexico is usually served in large portions and is sometimes the main or the second largest meal of the day. Some common dishes during breakfast are: huevos rancheros, chilaquiles, quesadillas, entomatadas, tamales, tlayuda, birria, atole, molletes, pambazo, huevos a la mexicana, enchiladas, barbacoa, menudo (soup) and carnitas.

=== Nicaragua ===
In Nicaragua, the typical breakfast consists of "gallo pinto" (national dish made out of red beans and rice), eggs, cheese, corn tortillas, and sweet plantains. Meals are normally accompanied by different juices and coffee. On Sundays, nacatamales are the traditional breakfast. These consist of a mass of corn with rice, potatoes, pork or chicken and sliced onions wrapped in plantain leaves and is usually accompanied by cacao as a drink.

=== Panama ===
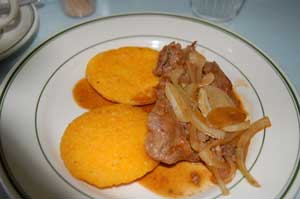
Corn tortillas with steak and onions, from Panama

In Panama, breakfast is a heavy meal, especially in the interior of the country where hard labor requires it. It always includes black coffee (tinto) or with milk (called pintado) with any of these sides: corn tortillas, traditional white cheese (or queso del pais), another type of tortillas or "torrejas" made of wheat flour known as "hojaldres." Another traditional breakfast side is "bollo" made out of either corn, white corn, or coconut that is wrapped in corn leaves and "preña'o" (meaning with child) that means it is filled with some type of meat.

As protein, a large serving of beef liver with onion, scrambled or fried eggs, beef stew or "tasajo" (a type of beef jerky), pork rinds and different kinds of sausages like chorizo or morcilla are the most popular. These are also accompanied by: slices of green plantain or cooking plantain, "patacones" (double fried plantain), carimañolas (yuca filled with meat), as well as different bread pastries both savory and sweet. These large breakfasts are normally reserved for special occasions while everyday breakfasts consist of more traditional food from the west like toast, ham, cheese, jam etc.

It is important to mention that the prolonged US presence has also influenced urban areas of Panama by introducing meals like cereal with milk as well as pancakes with syrup as traditional breakfast meals.

=== Puerto Rico ===
Puerto Rico, being a commonwealth of the United States, has adopted many American staples such as pancakes, waffles, bacon, English muffins, yogurt with fruit and nuts, French toast, eggs and steak. Pancakes and waffles can be made with plantain flour or breadfruit flour popular in the south. A Jibarita is a typical breakfast item much like buttermilk-banana pancakes but with sweet plantains and coconut milk. Crêpes are quite popular as a breakfast food filled with fresh fruit, jam, meats, or cheese.

Cremas come in many versions. One version is flavored with vanilla, clove, cinnamon sticks, brown sugar, star anise, orange peels, ginger, coconut milk, and butter.

Pan de Agua is a bread served aside coffee, jam, and butter.

Revoltillo is a Puerto Rican style scrambled eggs mixed with local cheese, milk, sofrito, squash, ham, shrimp, and other ingredients. Backed or roasted sweet potato or sweet plantains are cooked with its skin on. When done, it is split down the middle and top with butter, sugar, cheese, and cinnamon and served with chorizo or longanisa and eggs.

Sorullos are sweet corn fitters made with cornmeal, flour, milk, sugar, corn kernels, stuffed with cheese, rolled in to small logs and fried. They are sometimes compared to mozzarella sticks. Sorullos are served different depending on the time. For breakfast they dunked in coffee or hot chocolate.

Orange and papaya juice are standard for breakfast with some other restaurants and eatery having other options like mango, guava, apple, and other fruits. Punche de Malta is malta beverage shook with ice, eggs, evaporated milk, condensed milk, and cinnamon. Cow milk, goat milk and plant milks are also part of the breakfast. Hot chocolate and chocolate milk is enjoyed by kids and adults with breakfast.

=== United States ===
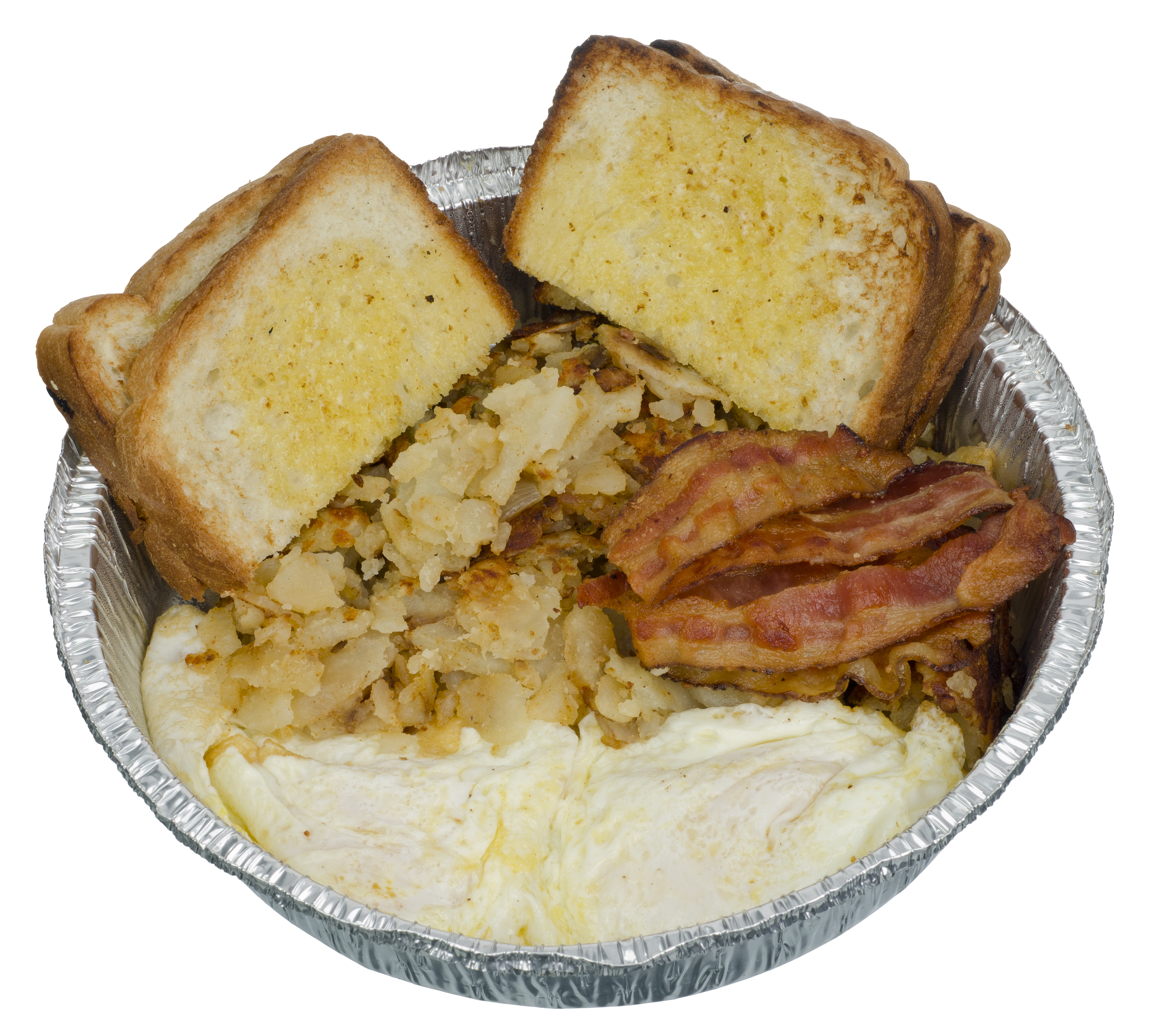
An example of an American diner breakfast, with overeasy eggs, hashbrowns, bacon, and buttered toast

The average starting time for breakfasts in the United States has been found to be 8:12 a.m, and varies from 8:08 a.m. in the South to 8:17 a.m. in the West.

==== Traditional ====
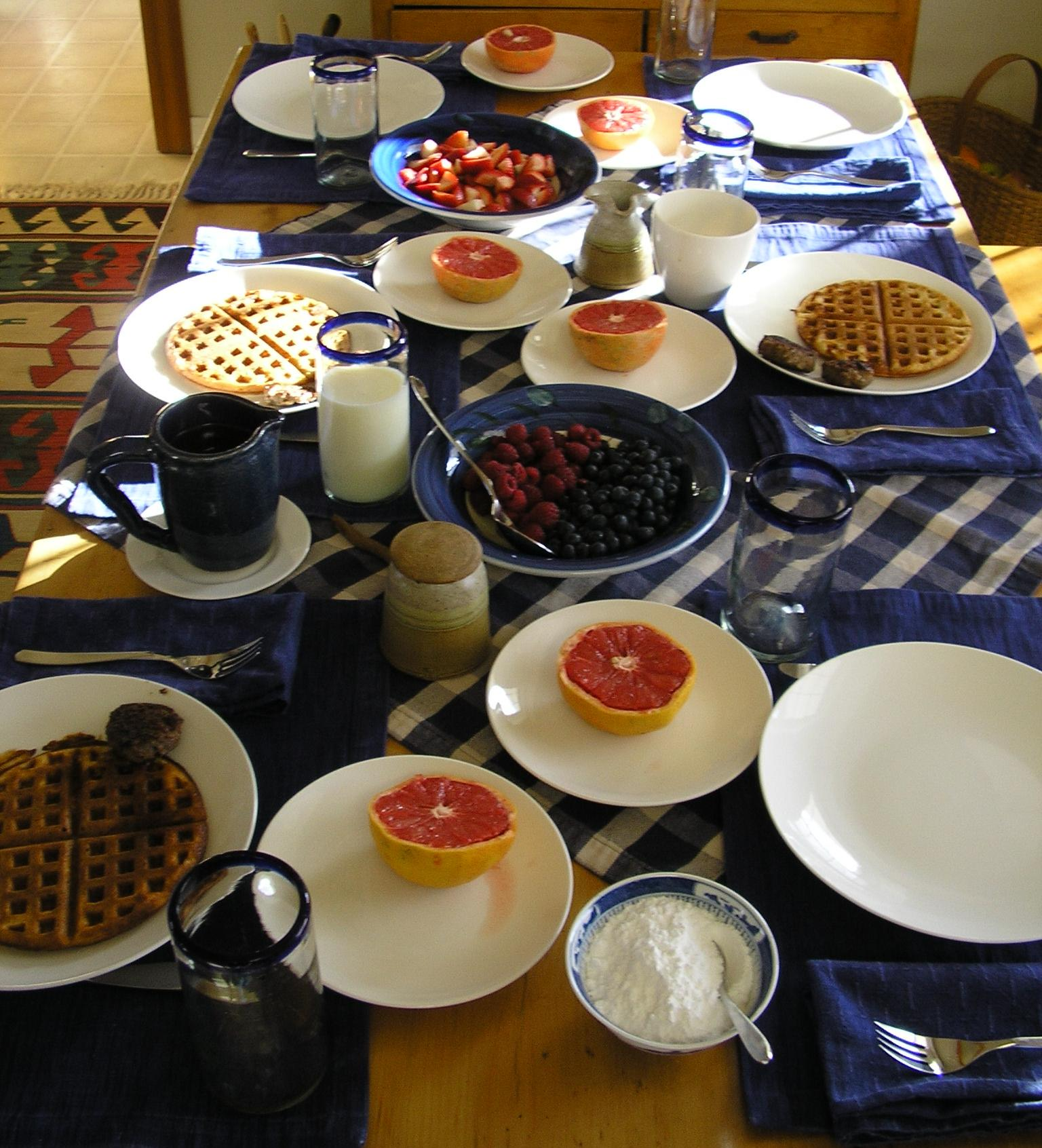
A waffle breakfast in the United States

There are two main types of breakfasts: traditional and quick. Traditional breakfasts, often eaten on weekends, consists of any combination of eggs, preserved meats, and breads such as pancakes, waffles, toast, or biscuits. Variants of the full breakfast and continental breakfast (see above) are also common. In the Southern United States, biscuits and gravy are popularly eaten at a traditional breakfast. In some regions, such as the Northeast, bagels are a common breakfast item, and are often served sliced in half, toasted, and spread with butter or cream cheese or other toppings. Another popular breakfast item in the United States are doughnuts, which are often consumed exclusive of other breakfast foods, and commonly eaten with coffee.

Breakfast sandwiches are also a common choice. Typical sandwiches are composed of egg, cheese, and cooked preserved meat such as bacon or sausage, between bread slices or on a roll, although regional varieties are common. In New Jersey, bacon is often swapped out of the breakfast sandwich and replaced with a processed meat called pork roll. Other areas alter the breakfast sandwich medium with regional favorites, such as biscuits. A variation is the breakfast burrito, which originates from Southwestern and Tex-Mex cuisines.

In the early 20th century, breakfast was served at the table, each place set with a breakfast doily, between nine and 12 inches square, with doilies serving as coasters for coffee and water glasses. Coffee was served on silver trays with pot, hot water pitcher, cream, milk and sugar. Different napkins were used for breakfast than for dinner. Breakfast napkins were smaller and usually made of linen, fringed or hemmed by hand. For more elegant napkins, borders of heavy lace or white embroidery decorations were added. Breakfast (served with coffee) could be as much as six dishes of salt fish or meat, omelette or other types of eggs, warm bread, pancakes or waffles, coffee cake, fruit or cereal.

==== Quick ====
Quick breakfasts are often eaten on weekdays, before school or work, when there is no time or no need for a large breakfast. This type of breakfast includes foods like oatmeal, grits, breakfast cereal, fruit and granola bars. They are often eaten with beverages such as juice or coffee. Toast, often buttered, is popular as well.

==== Drinks ====
Coffee is a common beverage, as is tea. 65% of coffee is drunk during breakfast hours. Fruit juices, especially orange juice, are also common. Milk is also widely consumed, drunk either plain or prepared with various flavorings, such as chocolate, as coffee milk (especially in the Northeast), or strawberry.

== Oceania ==
=== Australia ===
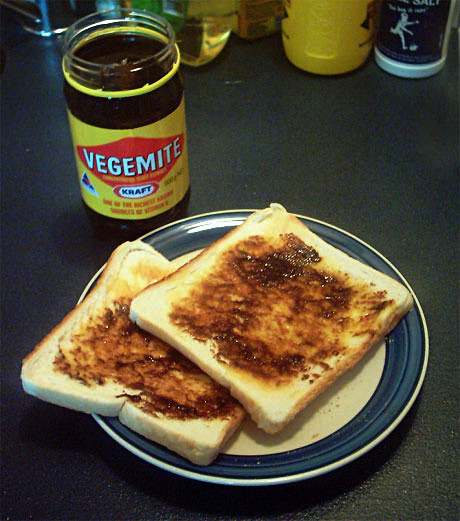
Toast with vegemite

Prior to the Second World War and the widespread adoption of household refrigerators, the traditional Australian breakfast consisted of grilled steaks and fried eggs, mainly because of the ready availability of beefsteak during that period. Although this is still eaten in the bush, very few urban Australians today would recall this breakfast format.

The majority of urban Australians eat commercially prepared cereal with pasteurised milk or yogurt and toast with preserves such as jam or vegemite for breakfast. Two of the most common cereals are cornflakes and a type of biscuit made from compressed toasted flakes of wheat, called Weet-bix. Fruit is also common at breakfast, either on the cereal or eaten separately. Cereals with added sugar and marketed largely to children include Frosties, Nutri-Grain, Rice Bubbles, Froot Loops and Coco Pops.

While not unusual, a cooked breakfast is more likely to be eaten on weekends or on special occasions either at home or at a café. A cooked breakfast can include eggs, bacon, sausages, breakfast steaks, mushrooms, tomato, hash browns, mashed avocados (locally known as ‘smashed avo’) and pancakes, similar to both the British and American cooked breakfast.

Breakfast habits differ more between age groups or families than between cities.

=== Fiji ===
In ethnically Fijian villages, breakfast may be tea served with milk and sugar, and food made out of flour: tovoi or babakau (a type of fried dough), pancakes, bread or biscuits with butter. Sometimes a starch, such as cassava, taro in coconut milk, or rice, is served instead. Leftover fish or meat from the previous night's meal may be served as well. Tea made from lemon leaves (called draunimoli) and fruits such as pineapple, banana, papaya, plantain, and watermelon are also occasionally served. In urban households, tea and cereals are often consumed. Breakfast foods eaten by Fiji Indians often include a vegetable curry with roti and sometimes differ from the above. Fijians living in Rotuma sometimes eat nuqa fish in tarotaro (fermented coconut yogurt), with fresh tropical fruits.

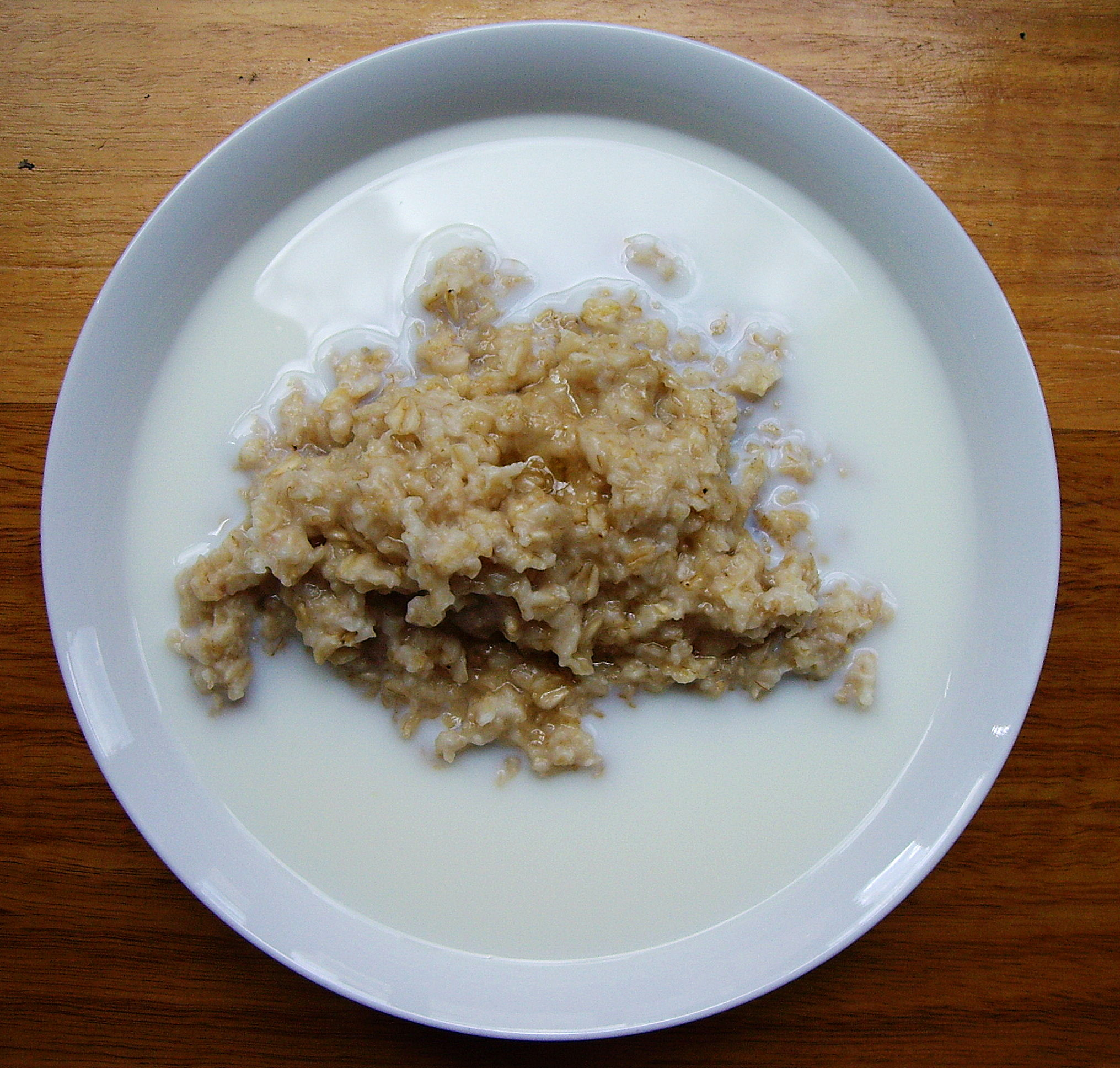
Porridge with milk

=== New Zealand ===
Breakfast in New Zealand is similar to that in Australia. The range of processed breakfast cereals is vast, and children are more likely to eat those that contain added sugar. During winter, porridge is commonly eaten. Porridge is typically served with milk, brown sugar, fruit or yoghurt. Toasted bread served with butter or margarine, preserves, spreads such as Marmite and Vegemite, or eggs is also common. Eating breakfast at a cafe or restaurant was very uncommon in New Zealand until the 1990s; cafes which serve breakfast or brunch until midday, or even all day, are now common.

A type of large cooked breakfast, commonly known as a Big Breakfast, is one of the main breakfast items at cafes and restaurants, being similar to the British cooked breakfast except that it seldom includes black or white pudding or fried bread; as in Australia, it may contain a small strip of steak instead. Other common menu items include various egg dishes, such as Eggs Benedict, beans, minced beef or avocado on toast, sweetcorn fritters, pancakes, cereal and yoghurt, fruit salads and smoothies. Breakfast in New Zealand often includes tea or coffee, with children often drinking milk on its own, with cereal, or mixed with milo. Concern has been raised about the cost of milk in New Zealand and some families being unable to afford it.

Some NGOs and charities, such as the New Zealand Red Cross, provide breakfast to primary school children from low-income families. Survey results released in 2013 claim that nearly half of all New Zealanders skip breakfast at least once a week with almost a third of those skipping breakfast up to three times a week.

== South America ==
=== Argentina ===
In Argentina, breakfast is simple: tostadas, often topped with butter, marmalade and dulce de leche, or medialunas, usually served with milk coffee and orange juice.

=== Brazil ===
Breakfast in Brazil tends to be lighter as "Brazilians consider lunch to be a more important meal". It is called café da manhã in Portuguese, which translates to "morning coffee", and consists of a combination of bread, butter, jam, fruits, cheese, ham, eggs, cereal, pão de queijo, cakes, yogurt, coffee, milk, and fruit juice. Regional differences also exist.

Children may drink milk mixed with a small amount of coffee with their breakfasts.

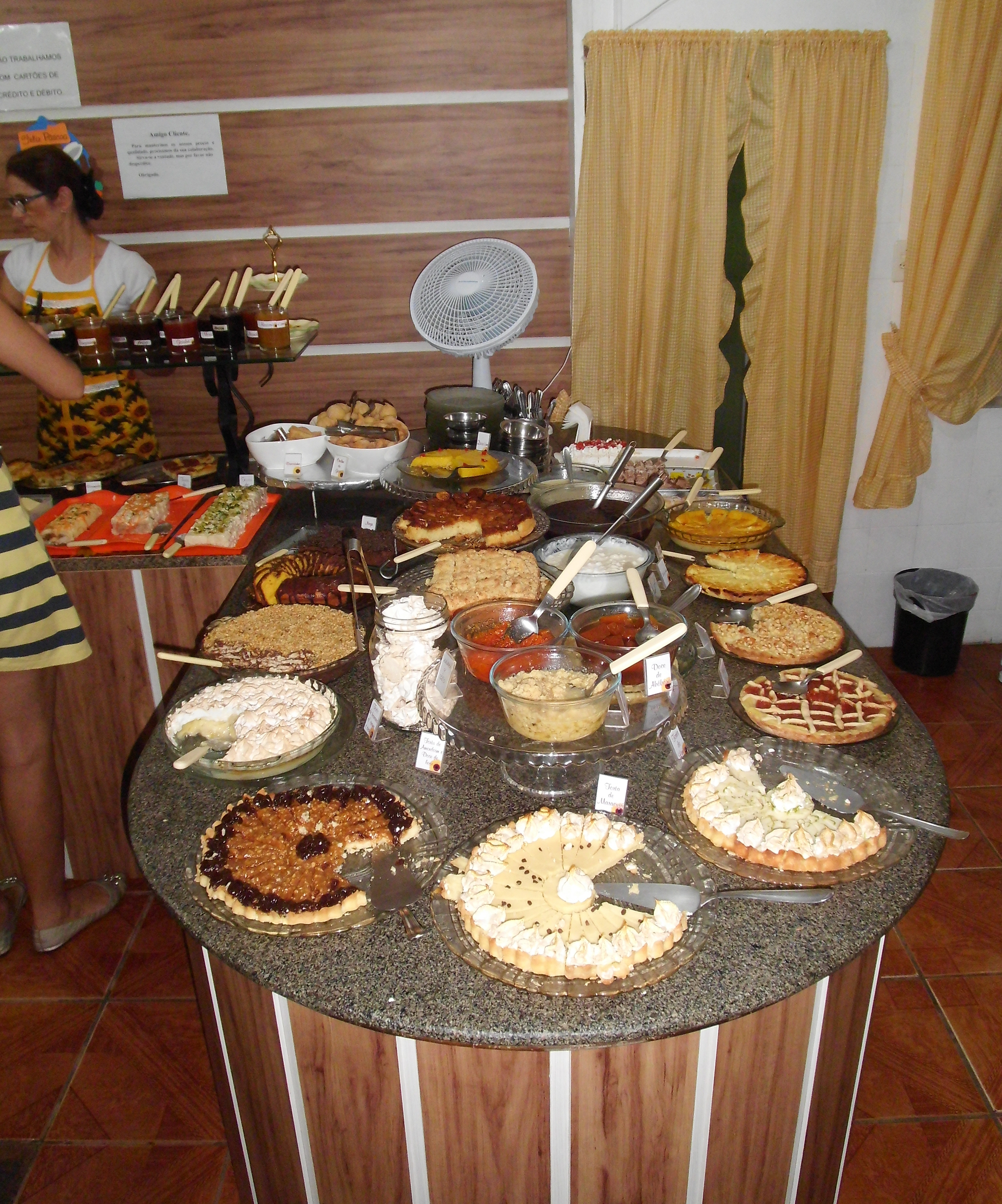
Typical café colonial in Santa Catarina

Because of the huge German immigration to the south of the country in the 19th century, many hotels, restaurants and coffeehouses there (specially in the state of Santa Catarina) offer the so-called café colonial ("colonial coffee" or "colonial breakfast"). It consists of a rich table composed of various breads, mainly homemade, which can be of the sourdough type, pão francês, pão de queijo, and sweet breads such as schnecken. A variety of pies and cakes, such as cuca, corn cake and cornbread. In addition to foods such as butter, schmear, cheeses, ham, sausages, wiener sausage, bock sausage, pork, crackers and biscuits, ricotta and honey, among others. Accompanied by drinks such as milk, coffee, hot chocolate and even wine.

=== Uruguay ===
The most traditional breakfast in Uruguay is to just drink mate early in the morning, usually served with torta frita. Nowadays, people also prefer coffee, usually prepared with milk. Children tend to prefer chocolate milk and a more American-style breakfast, like breakfast cereal with milk or yogurt. Another common food is cheese, as Uruguay's per-capita yearly consumption of milk derivatives is around twice the global average and cheese is the top choice. Bizcochos (margaritas, croissants, etc.) are probably the most common choice to serve with mate or coffee.

=== Chile ===
Chilean breakfast typically consists of coffee with milk or tea and toast with jams and/or butter. With children drinking milk and eating bread with jam.

Pan con Palta ( “bread with avocado”) is considered a very traditional light snack and has also become a source of Chilean identity over past generations.
