= List of toast dishes =

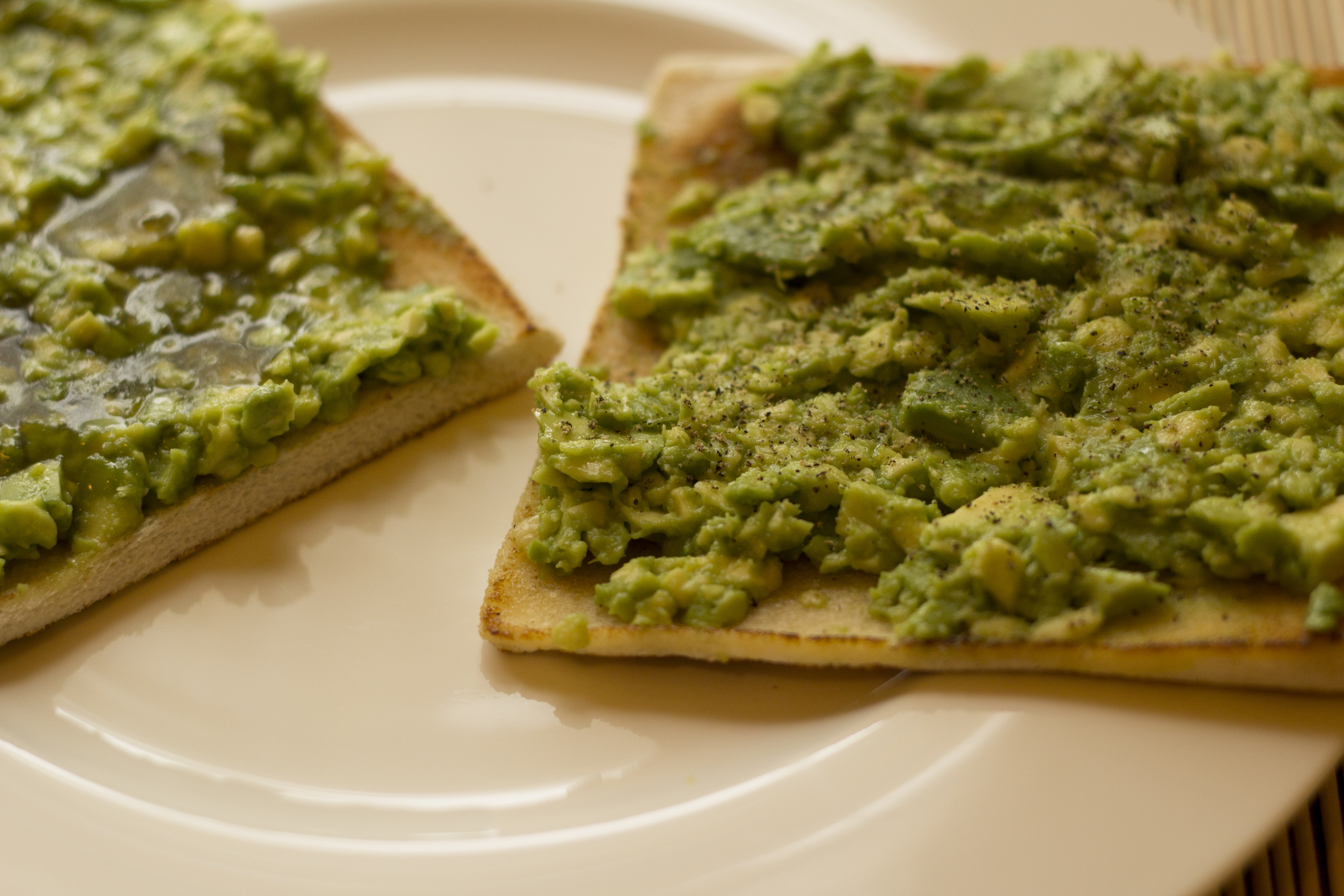
Avocado toast

Toast is sliced bread that has been browned by exposure to radiant heat. It appears as a main ingredient in many dishes, often as a base on which other food is served.

== Toast dishes ==
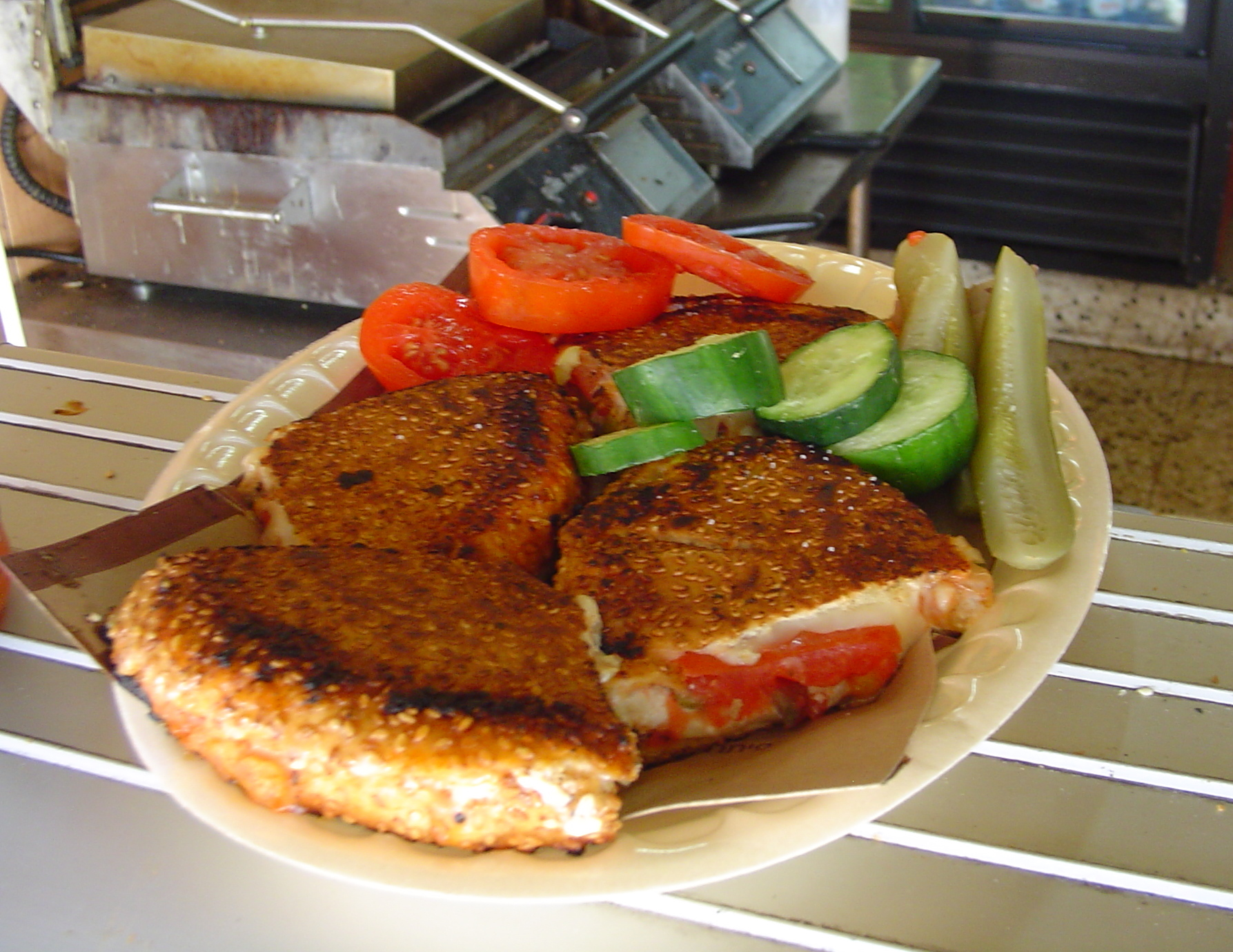
Bagel toast

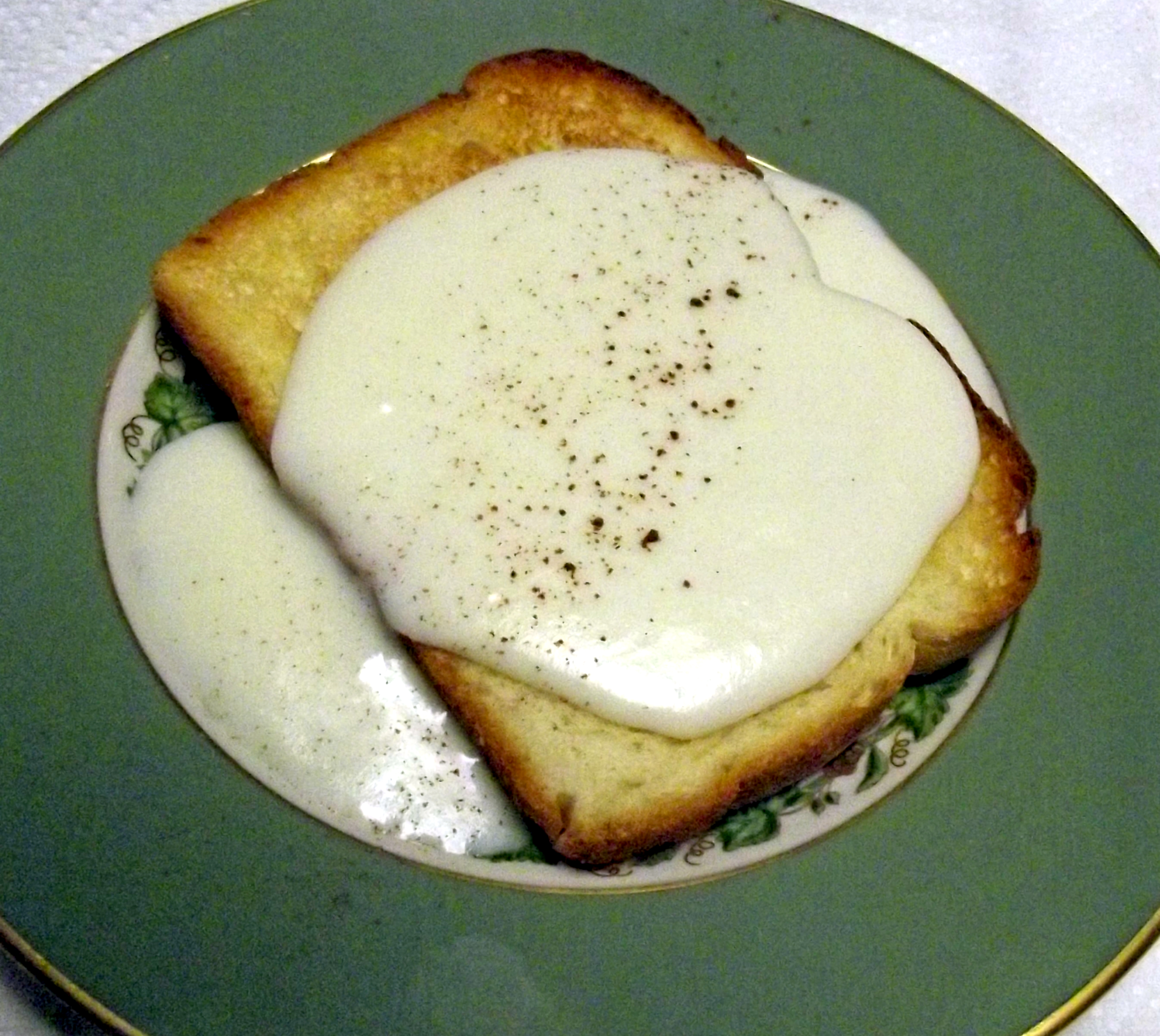
Simple milk toast consisting of toasted buttermilk bread covered in white sauce with a dash of cinnamon

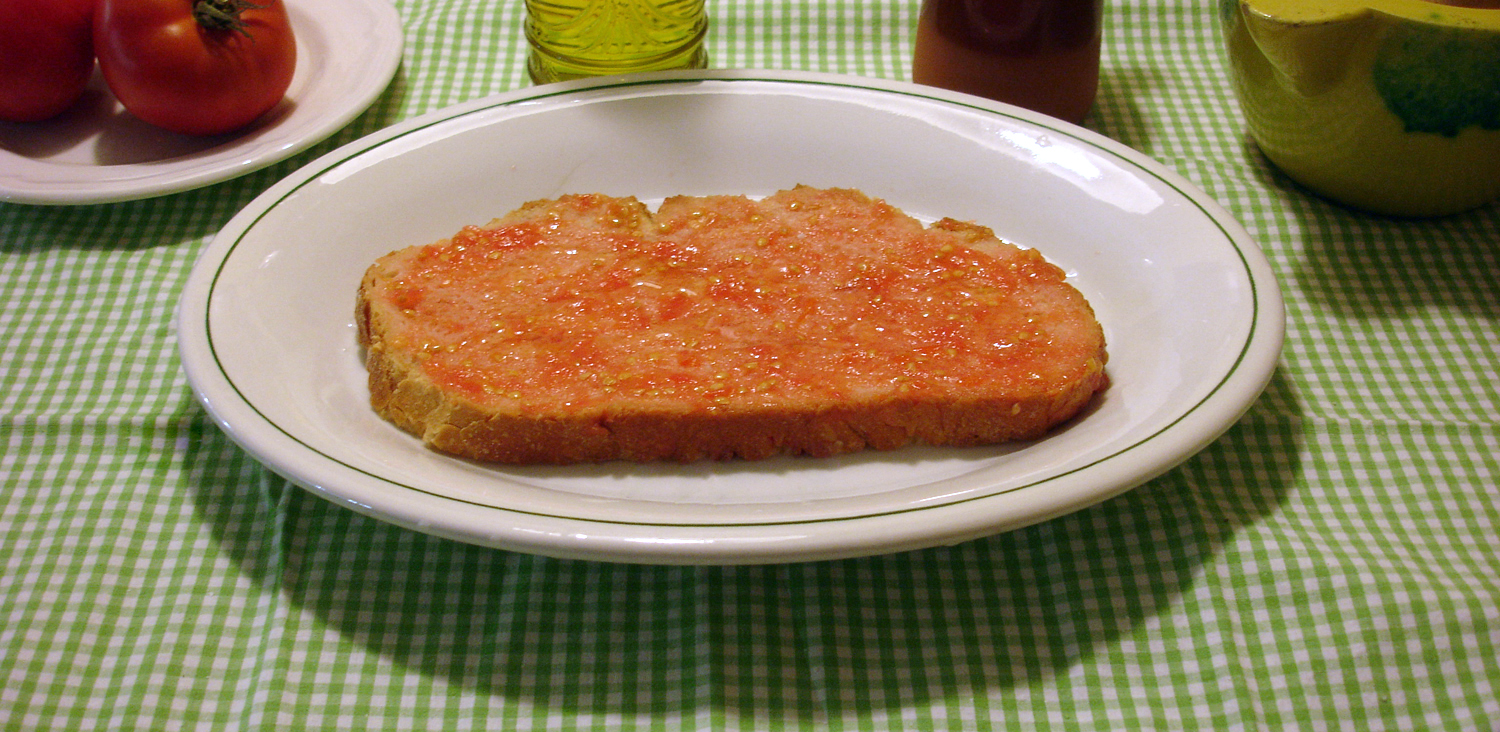
Pa amb tomàquet

- Avocado toast – mashed avocado on toast. A variety of additional ingredients can be used.
- Beans on toast – Baked beans on toast. The first documented reference to beans being served on toast, at popular restaurants at Briggate and Boar Lane, Leeds, England, was in 1917.
- Bruschetta – an antipasto from Italy consisting of grilled bread rubbed with garlic and topped with olive oil and salt. Variations may include toppings of tomato, vegetables, beans, cured meat, or cheese.
- Cheese on toast – a snack made by placing cheese on slices of bread and melting the cheese under a grill. It is a simple meal, popular in the United Kingdom.
- Chipped beef on toast – typically consists of a white sauce and re-hydrated slivers of dried beef, served on toasted bread. It was a common dish in U.S. army mess halls during World War II, at which time it was given the nickname "shit on a shingle".
- Cinnamon toast – buttered bread, covered in a mix of cinnamon and sugar, and toasted in an oven.
- Creamed eggs on toast – consists of toast or American-style biscuits covered in a gravy made from bechamel sauce and chopped hard-boiled eggs.
- Crostino – an Italian appetizer consisting of small slices of grilled or toasted bread and toppings.
- Egg in the basket – an egg fried in a hole made in a slice of bread.
- French toast – bread soaked in milk, then in beaten eggs and then fried.
- Garlic bread – consists of bread (usually a baguette or sour dough like a ciabatta), topped with garlic and olive oil or butter and may include additional herbs, like chives. It is then either grilled or broiled until toasted, or baked in a conventional or bread oven.
- Kaya toast – a traditional Singaporean breakfast item and well known snack in Malaysia, it is toast topped with kaya (coconut jam), a topping of sugar, coconut milk and eggs, pandan, and sometimes margarine or butter. Crackers are also sometimes used instead of toast.
- Melba toast – a dry, crisp and thinly sliced toast, often served with soup and salad or topped with either melted cheese or pâté.
- Mince on toast – consists of cooked ground meat on a slice of toasted bread.
- Milk toast – a breakfast food consisting of toasted bread in warm milk, typically with sugar and butter.
- Ogura toast – a popular Japanese toast variety that originated in Nagoya's café scene in the 1920s. Red bean paste and butter are spread on thick slices of Shokupan.
- Pa amb tomàquet – a simple and typical recipe in Catalan cuisine consisting of bread, preferably pa de pagès type which may or may not be toasted, with tomato rubbed on it and seasoned with olive oil and salt. Various additional toppings may be added, such as cheese, anchovies and ham.
- Roti bakar – an Indonesian breakfast dish consisting of two slices of bread and a sweet filling.
- Roti john – sliced halves of a French loaf fried with a topping of minced mutton, sliced onions and egg.
- Scotch woodcock - a British dish consisting of creamy, lightly-scrambled eggs served on toast that has been spread with anchovy paste or Gentleman's Relish, and sometimes topped with chopped herbs and black pepper, traditionally served as a savoury.
- Shrimp toast – a Chinese dim sum dish made from small triangles of bread, brushed with egg and coated with minced shrimp and water chestnuts, then cooked by baking or deep frying.
- Soldiers – thin strips of toast; the strips that a slice is cut into are reminiscent of soldiers on parade. The toast is sliced in this manner so that it can be dipped into a soft-boiled egg that has had the top of its shell removed.
- Toast Hawaii – an open sandwich consisting of a slice of toast with ham and cheese, and a maraschino cherry in the middle of a ring of tinned pineapple.
- Toast sandwich – a sandwich made by putting a thin slice of toast between two thin slices of bread with a layer of butter, and adding salt and pepper to taste.
- Toast Skagen – a Swedish starter and food dish consisting of two pieces of toasted bread, mayonnaise, and prawns.
- Toast water – toast soaked in water, then strained. Served chilled to the sick and weak in the 19th and 20th centuries.
- Toastie – an enclosed hot sandwich, which uses a pie iron/sandwich toastie maker.
- Tongue toast – an historic traditional open sandwich prepared with sauteed beef tongue and scrambled eggs, it was sometimes served on buttered toast with a poached egg instead of a scrambled one.
- Welsh rarebit – a dish consisting of a hot cheese-based sauce served over slices of toasted bread.
Toast dishes

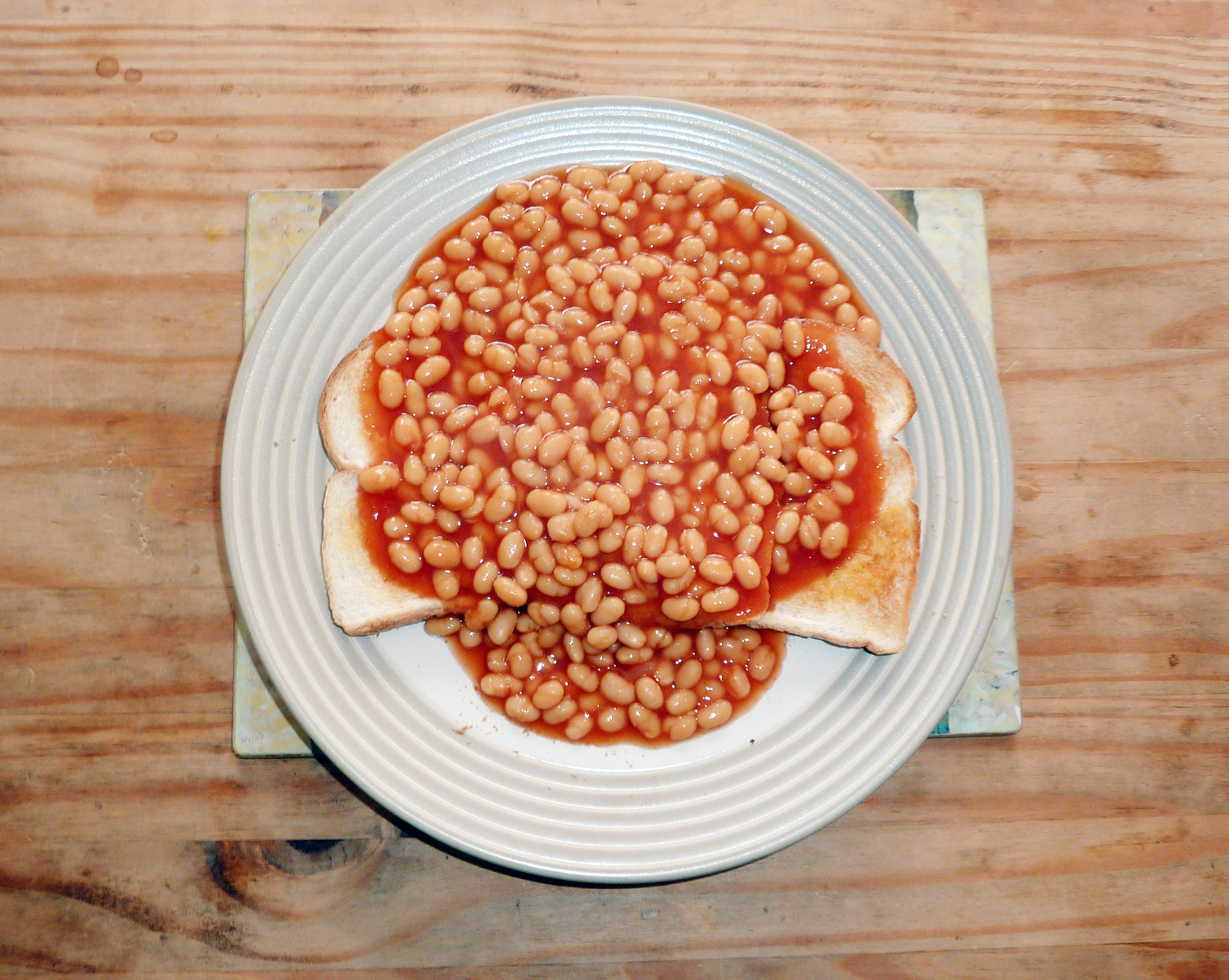
Beans on toast

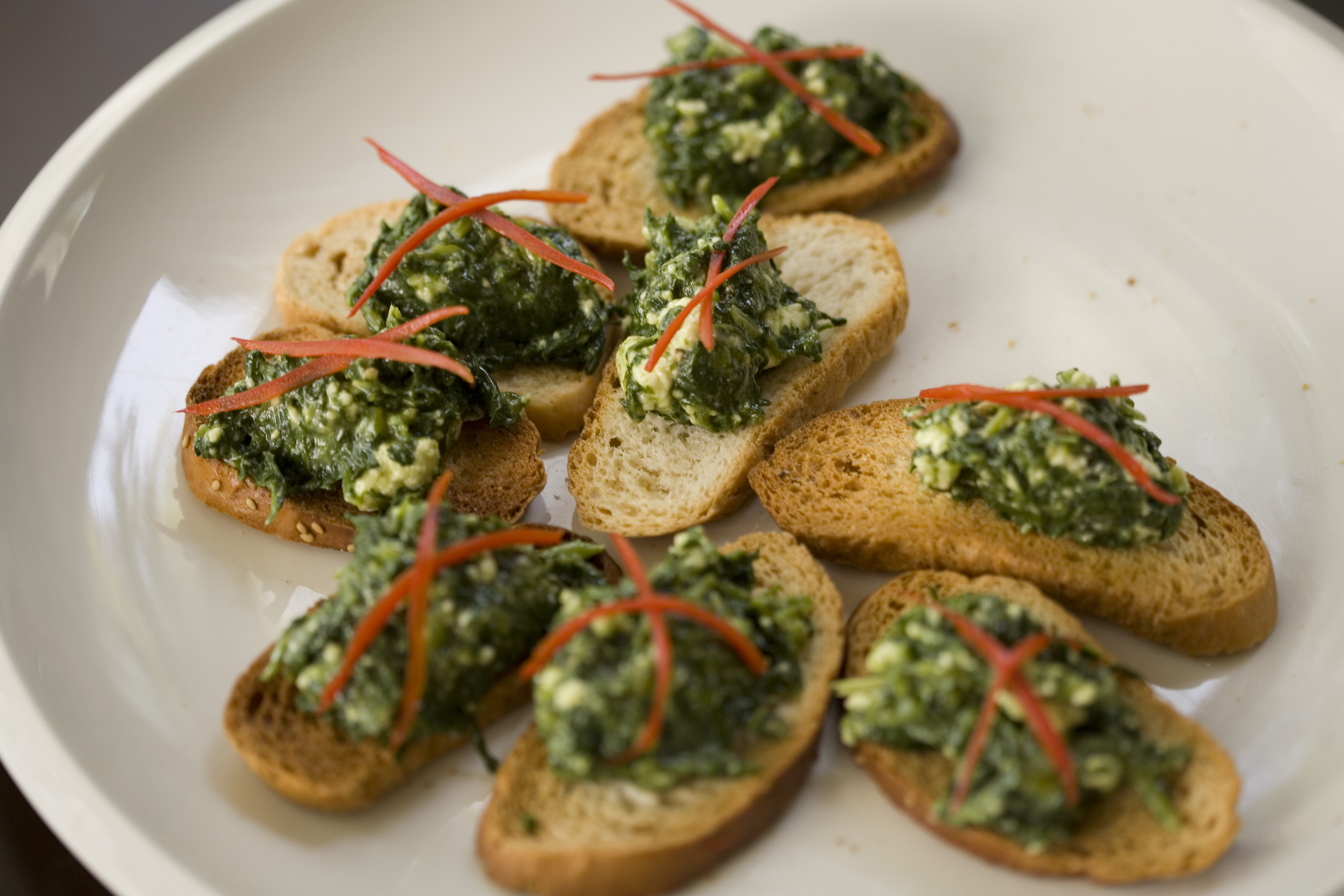
Cheese and spinach crostino

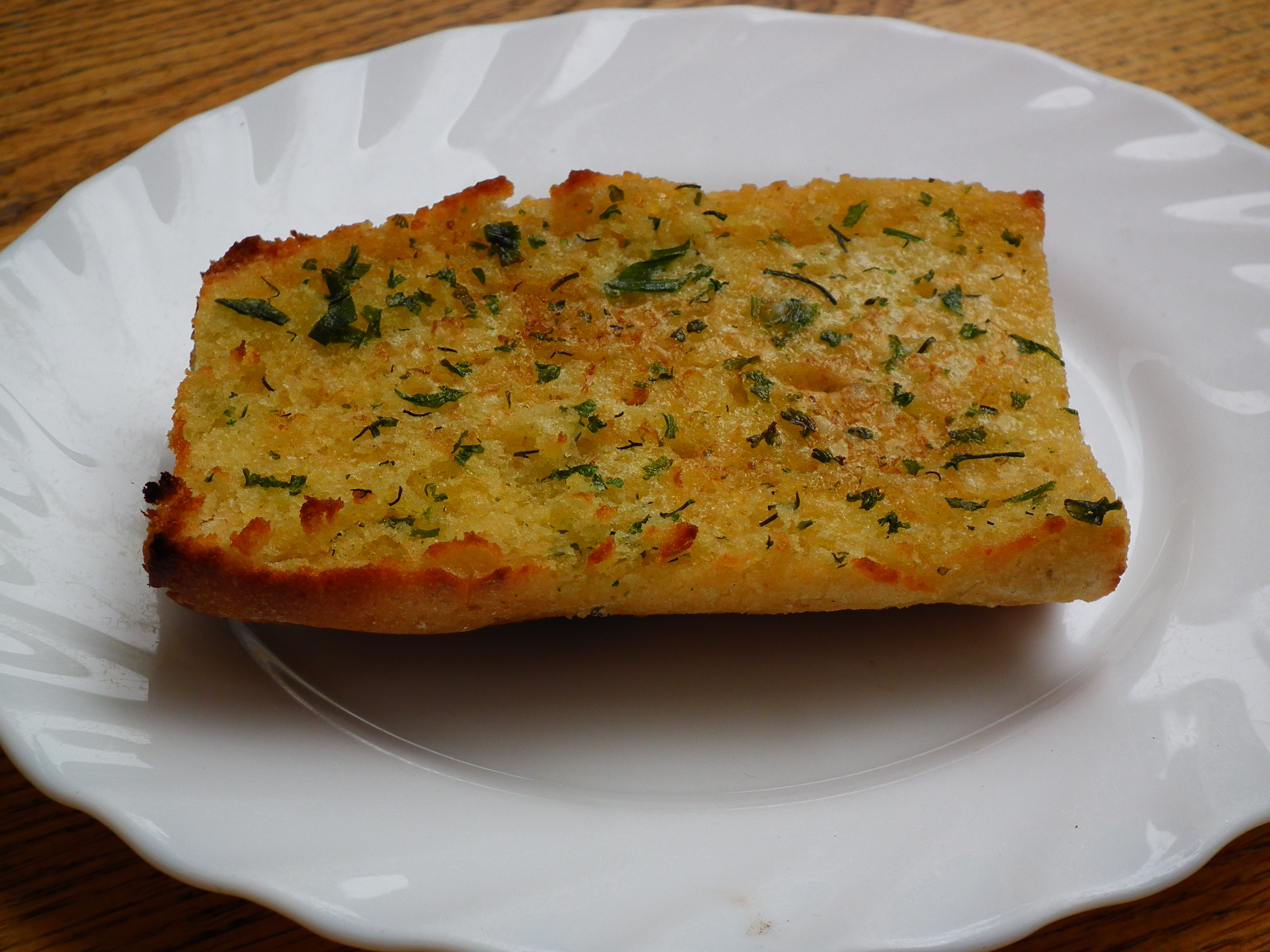
A slice of garlic bread

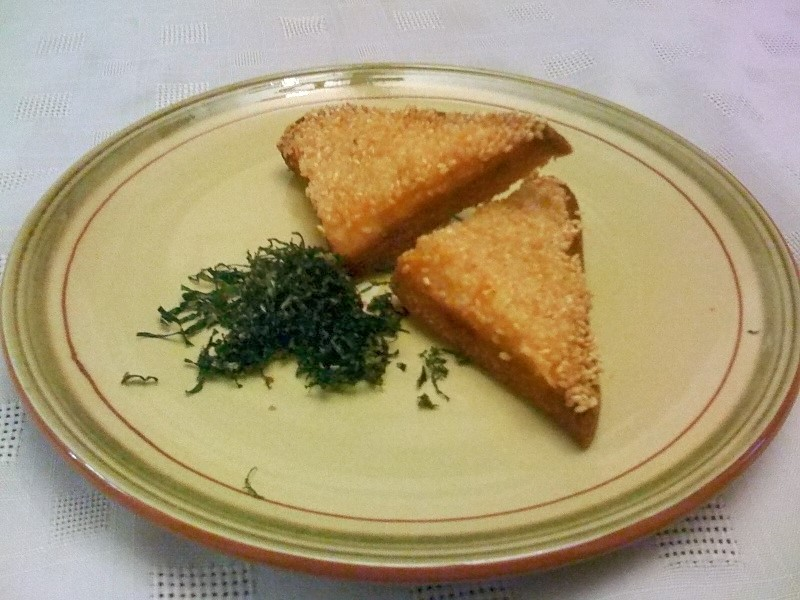
Shrimp toast with sesame seeds

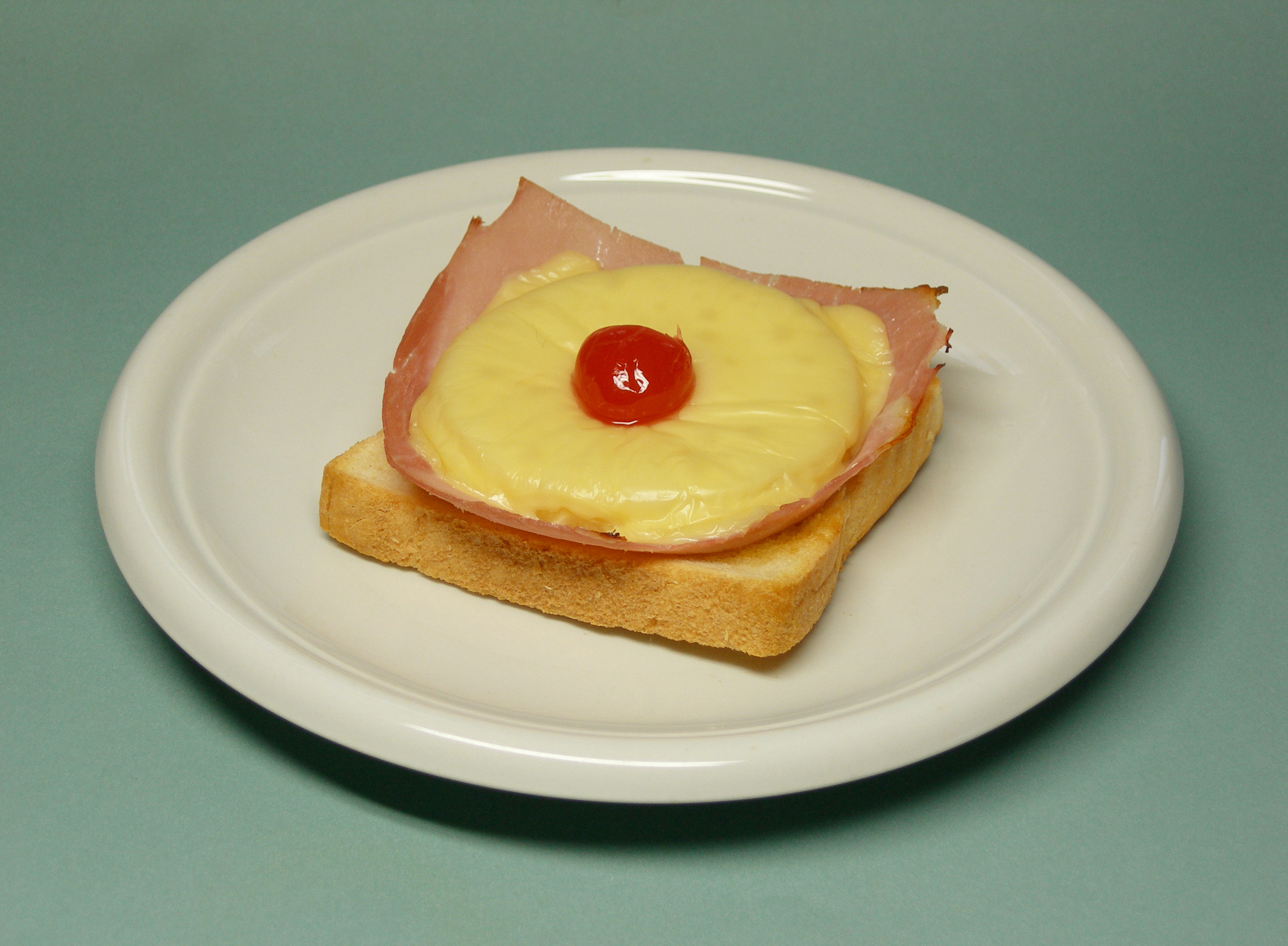
Toast Hawaii

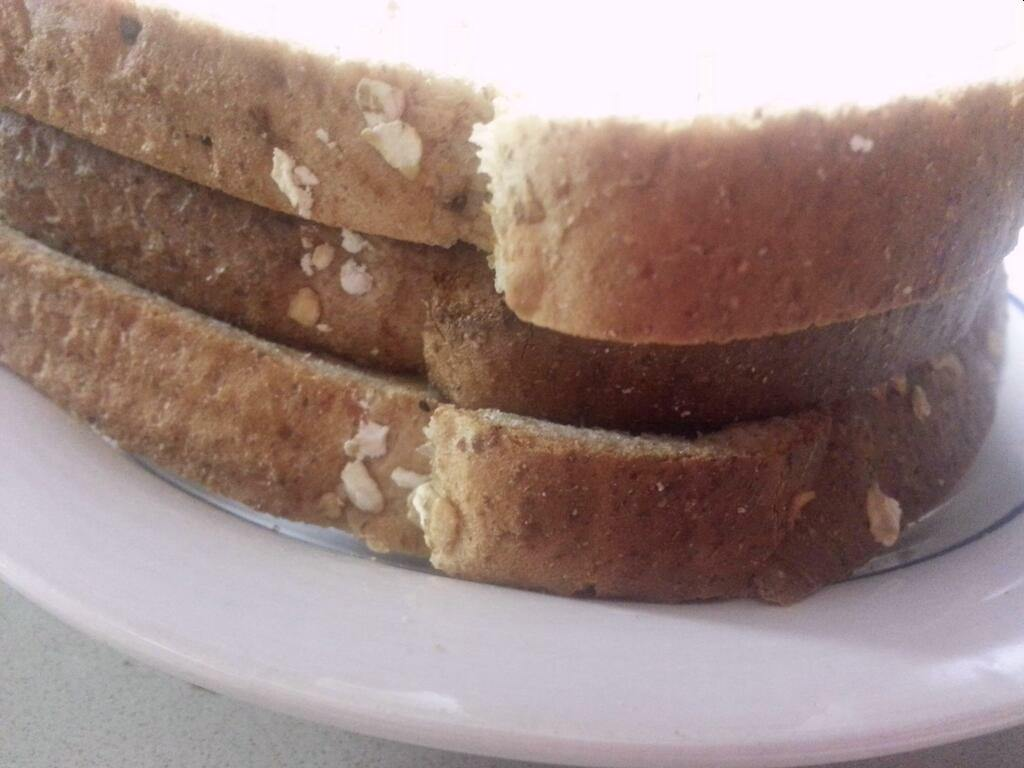
Toast sandwich

== See also ==
- Crouton
- Fried bread
- Isaac Toast – South Korean toast restaurant chain
- List of bread dishes
- Sop
- Toast point
- Toast rack
- Toaster pastry
- Tostada (toast) – Hispanic American food term
