= Frankies 457 Spuntino =

Coordinates: 40.677396°N 73.998083°W

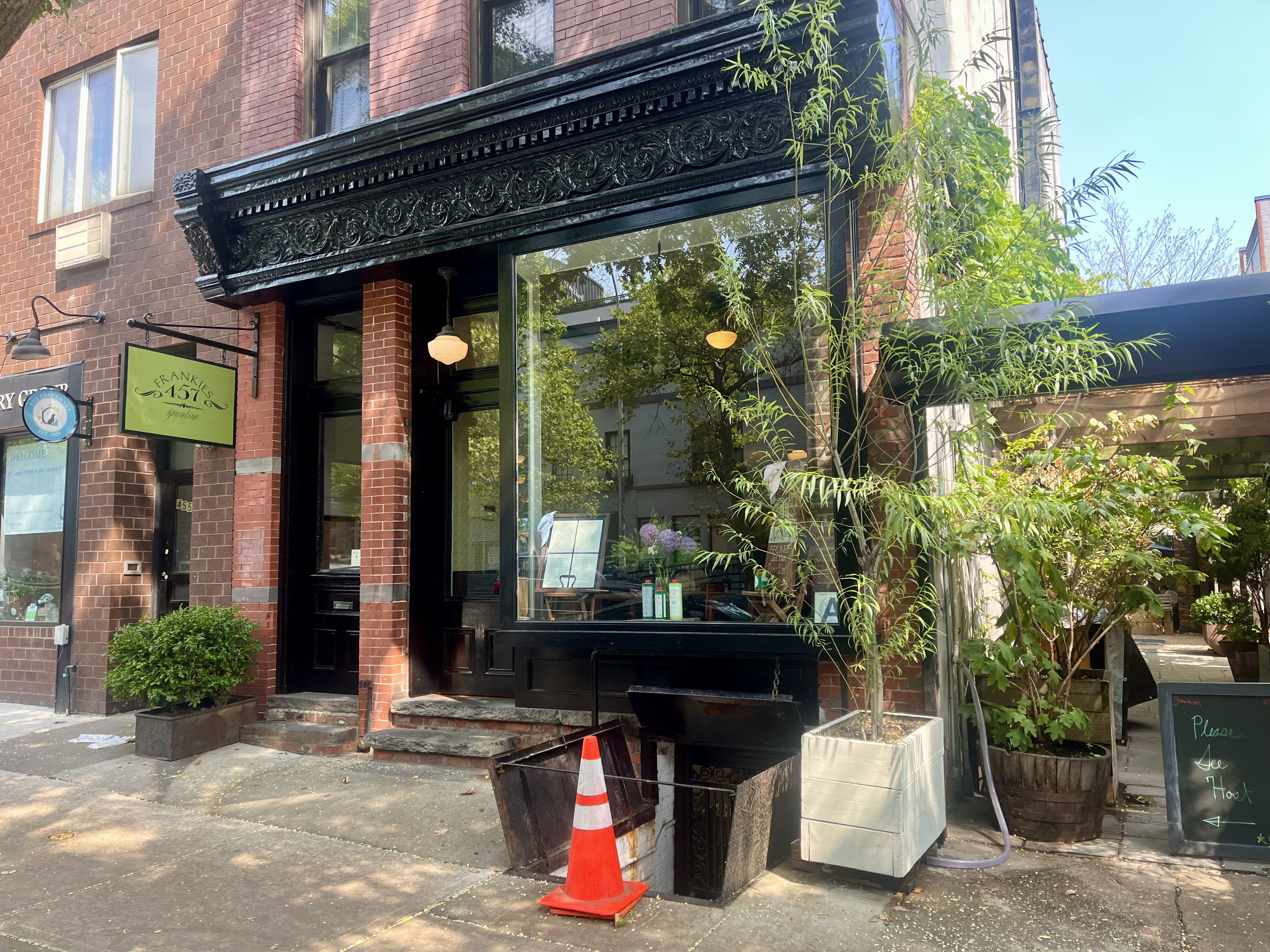
- The restaurant's exterior in 2025
- Interactive map of Frankies 457 Spuntino

Restaurant information
- Established: 2004
- Owners: Frank Castronovo; Frank Falcinelli
- Food type: Italian cuisine
- Dress code: Casual
- Location: 457 Court Street, Brooklyn, New York, 11231, United States
- Website: www.frankiesspuntino.com

Frankies 457 Spuntino is an Italian restaurant and olive oil company located in Carroll Gardens, Brooklyn, New York established in 2004 by Frank Castronovo and Frank Falcinelli.

According to Laura Shunk of The Village Voice, the restaurant is considered one of the fourteen essential Italian restaurants in Brooklyn and is known as pioneers of the current crostini trend in New York. The chefs were James Beard Foundation Award semi-finalists for Outstanding Restaurateur in 2015.

== Frankies 457 Olive Oil ==
The restaurant produces Frankies 457 Extra Virgin Olive Oil, made from organically grown olives in Sicily; the oil is considered a favorite by both locals and chef Matty Matheson.

== See also ==
- List of Italian restaurants
