= Shrimp toast =

Chinese dim sum dish

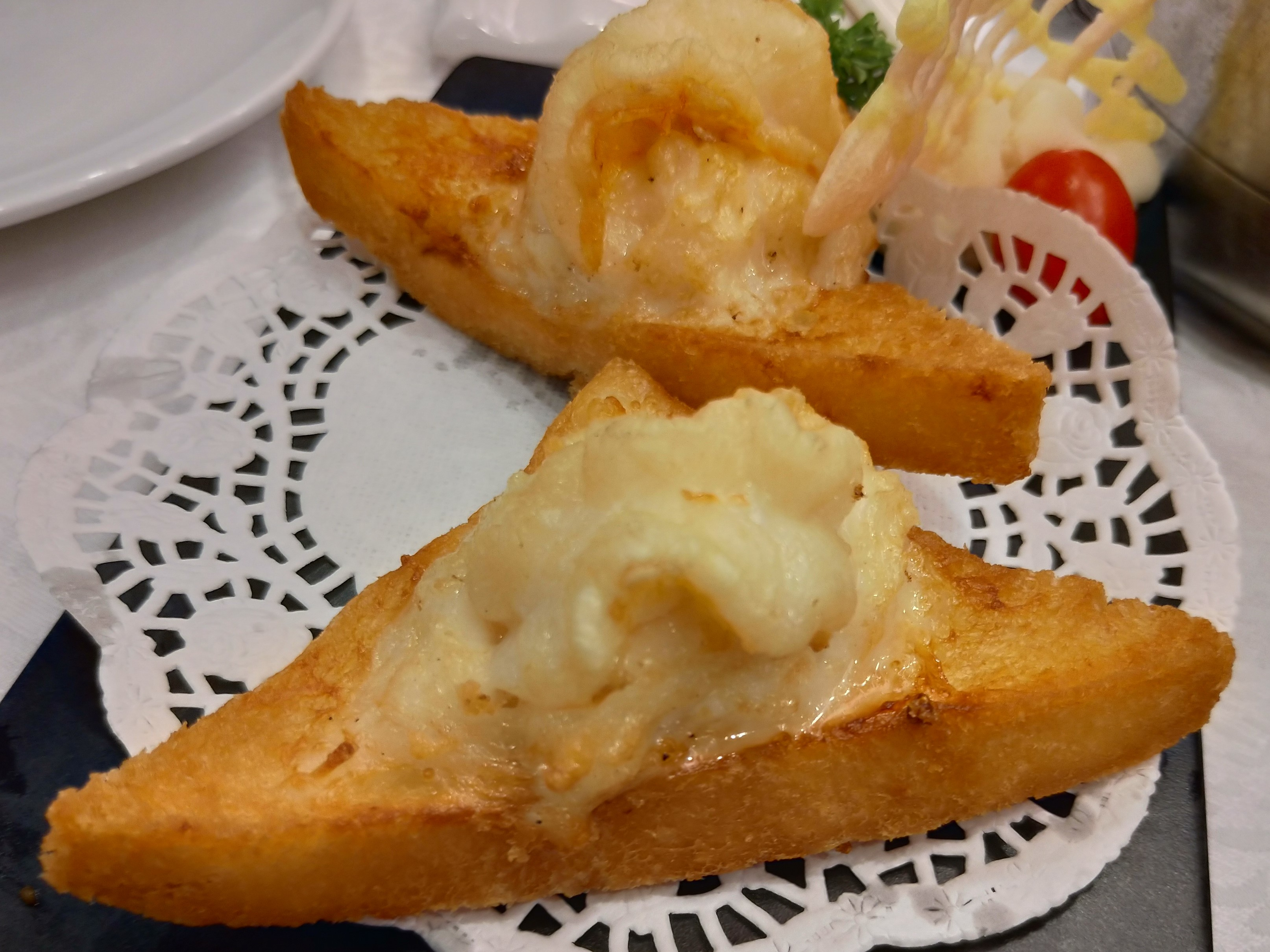
- Shrimp toasts in Hong Kong
- Alternative names: Prawn toast, hatosi
- Type: Dim sum
- Course: Snack food
- Place of origin: Hong Kong
- Main ingredients: Bread, shrimp
- Variations: Sesame prawn toast

Shrimp toast or prawn toast (Chinese: 蝦多士; Cantonese Yale: haa dō si) is a Cantonese dim sum dish from Hong Kong. It is made from small triangles of bread, coated with a paste made from minced shrimp and cooked by baking or deep frying. It is a common appetizer in Western Chinese cuisine. A common variant in the United Kingdom, Australia and Ireland is sesame prawn toast. This involves sprinkling sesame seeds onto the bread before the baking or deep-frying process.

== Gallery ==
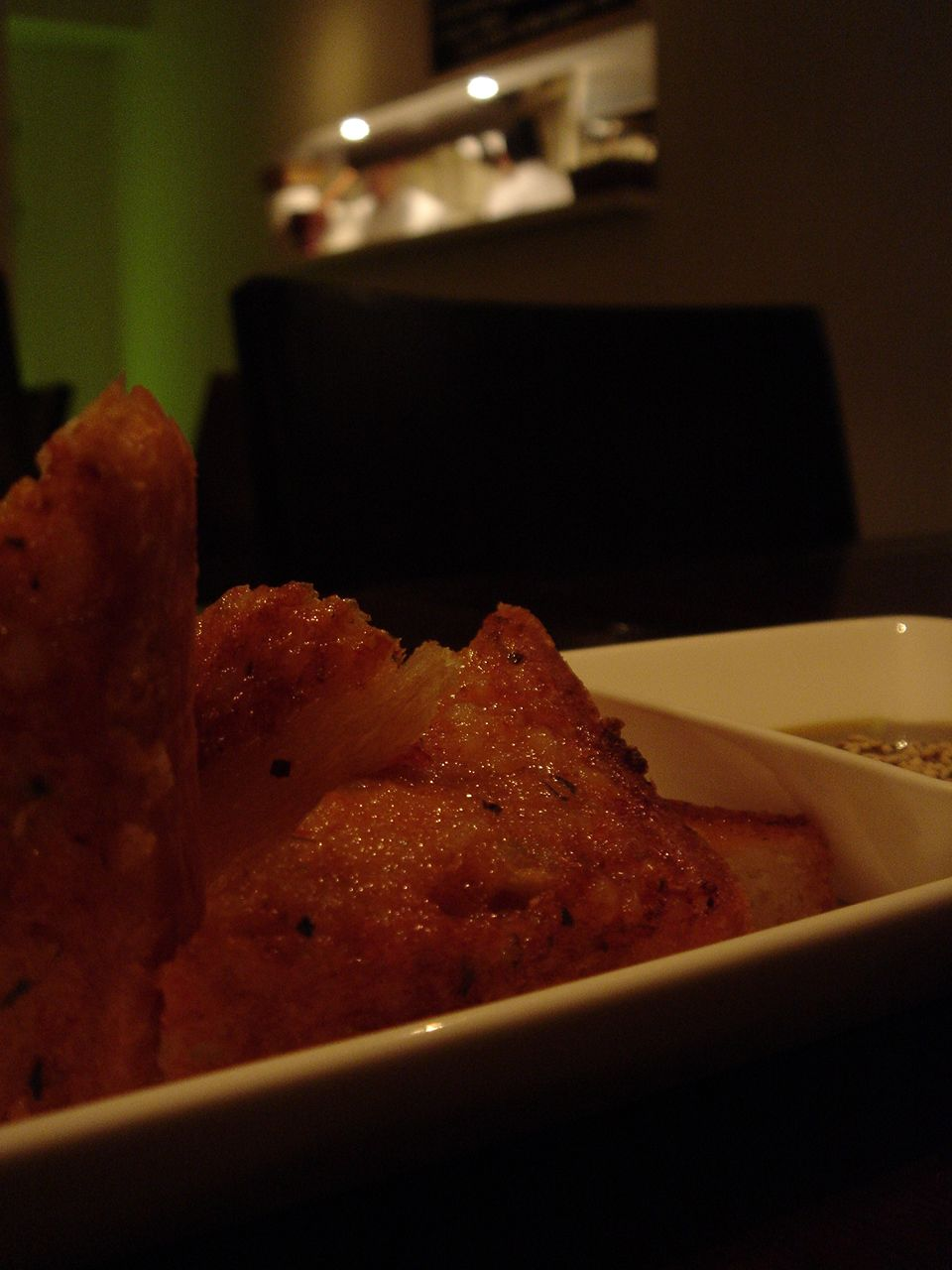
Deep-fried shrimp mince toast

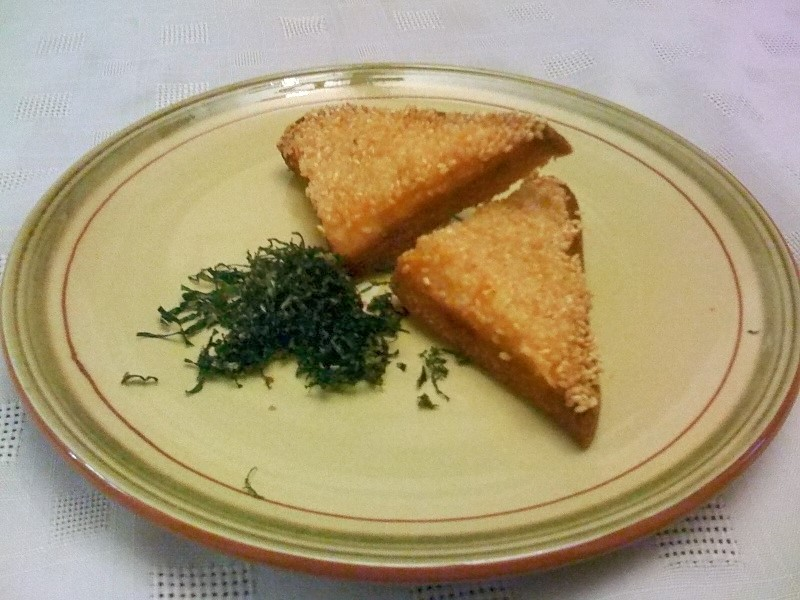
Sesame prawn toast

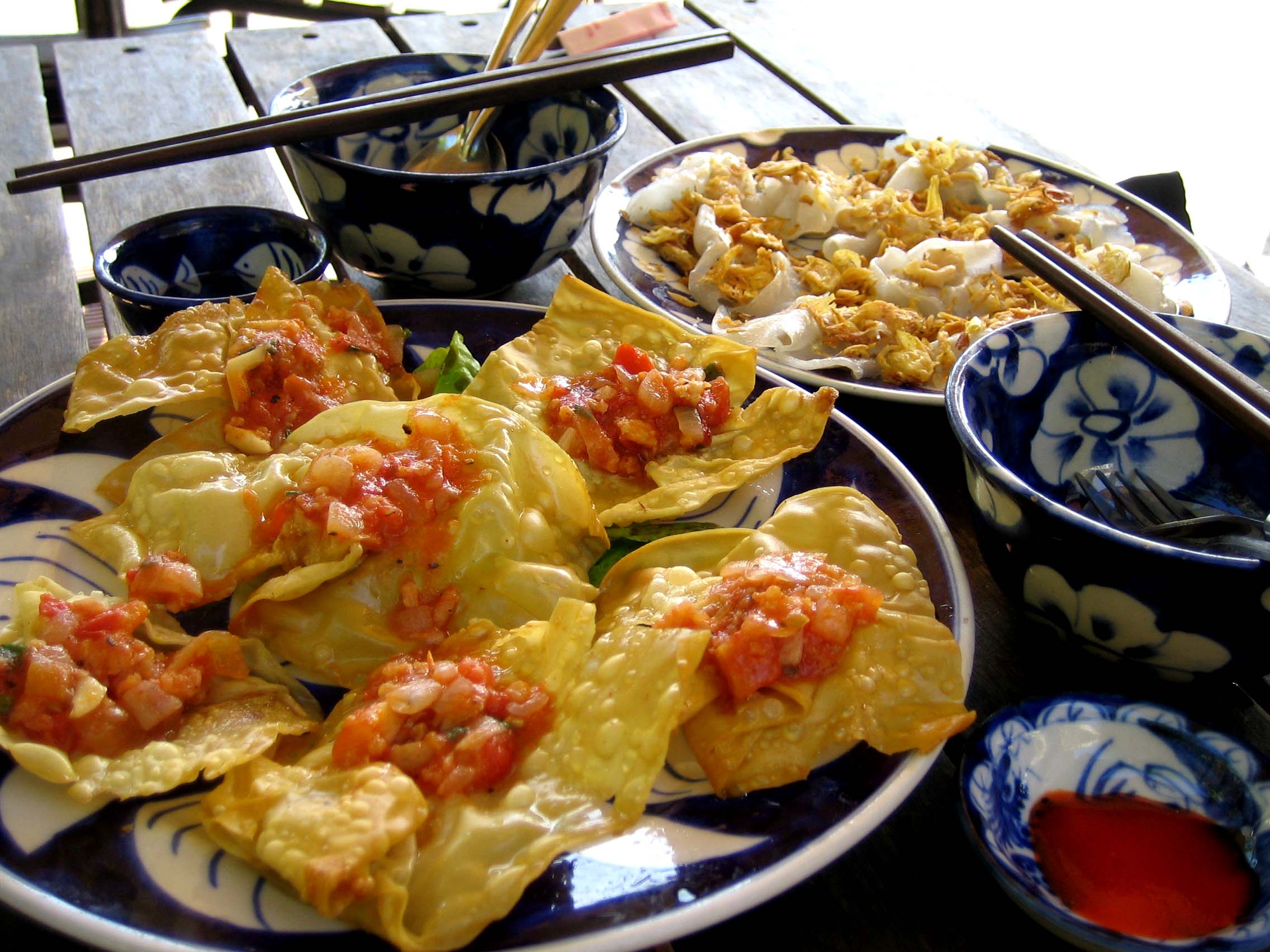
Vietnamese shrimp toast

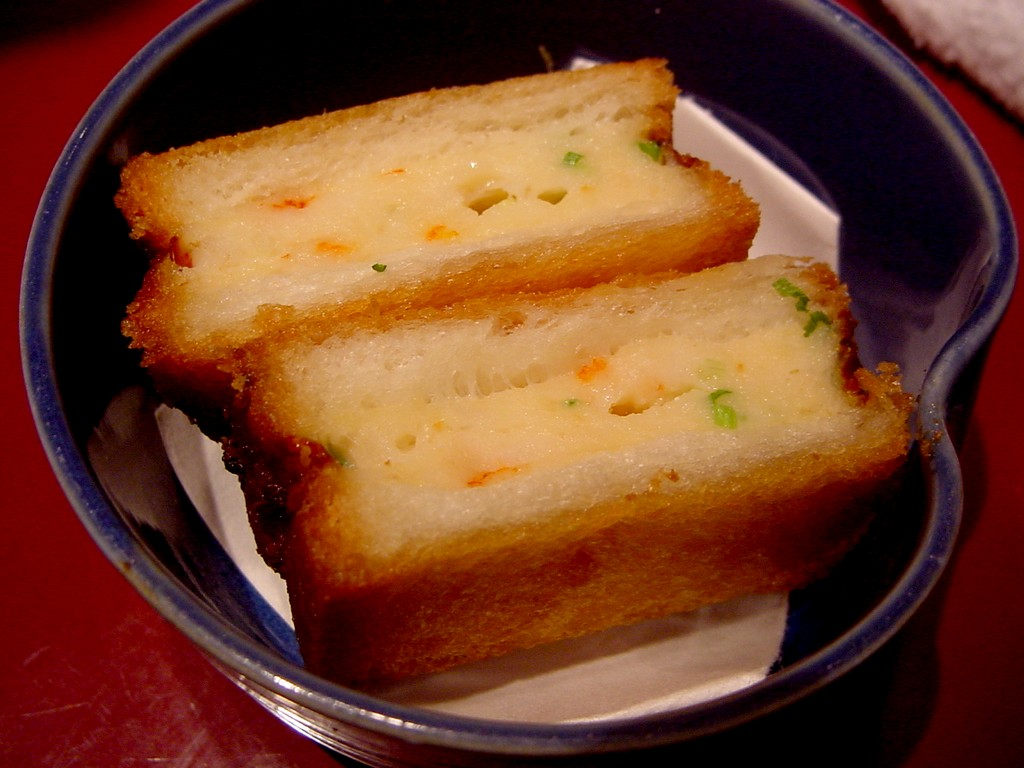
Hatoshi of Shippoku cuisine in Nagasaki, Japan

== History ==
The dish originates from Hong Kong, as an early form of fusion cuisine, combining prawn paste, which is very common in Hong Kong cuisine, and toast, originating from the West. The dish is called haa dō si 蝦多士 in Cantonese, haa, meaning prawn, and dō si, a loan word from English meaning toast. The dish's range expanded along with trading routes, making its way to Japan and Southeast Asia countries like Vietnam and Thailand.

== Japan ==
The dish was introduced to Japan during the Meiji period through the port of Nagasaki, whose local Shippoku cuisine blended the cookery of China, Japan, and the West. In Japanese, shrimp toast is known as hatoshi (Japanese: ハトシ), a loan word from Cantonese. Many Chinese restaurants and shops in Nagasaki's Chinatown still serve this dish. Some also serve a variant made with pork.

== See also ==
- Krupuk
- List of toast dishes
