= Mince on toast =

Cooked ground meat on toasted bread

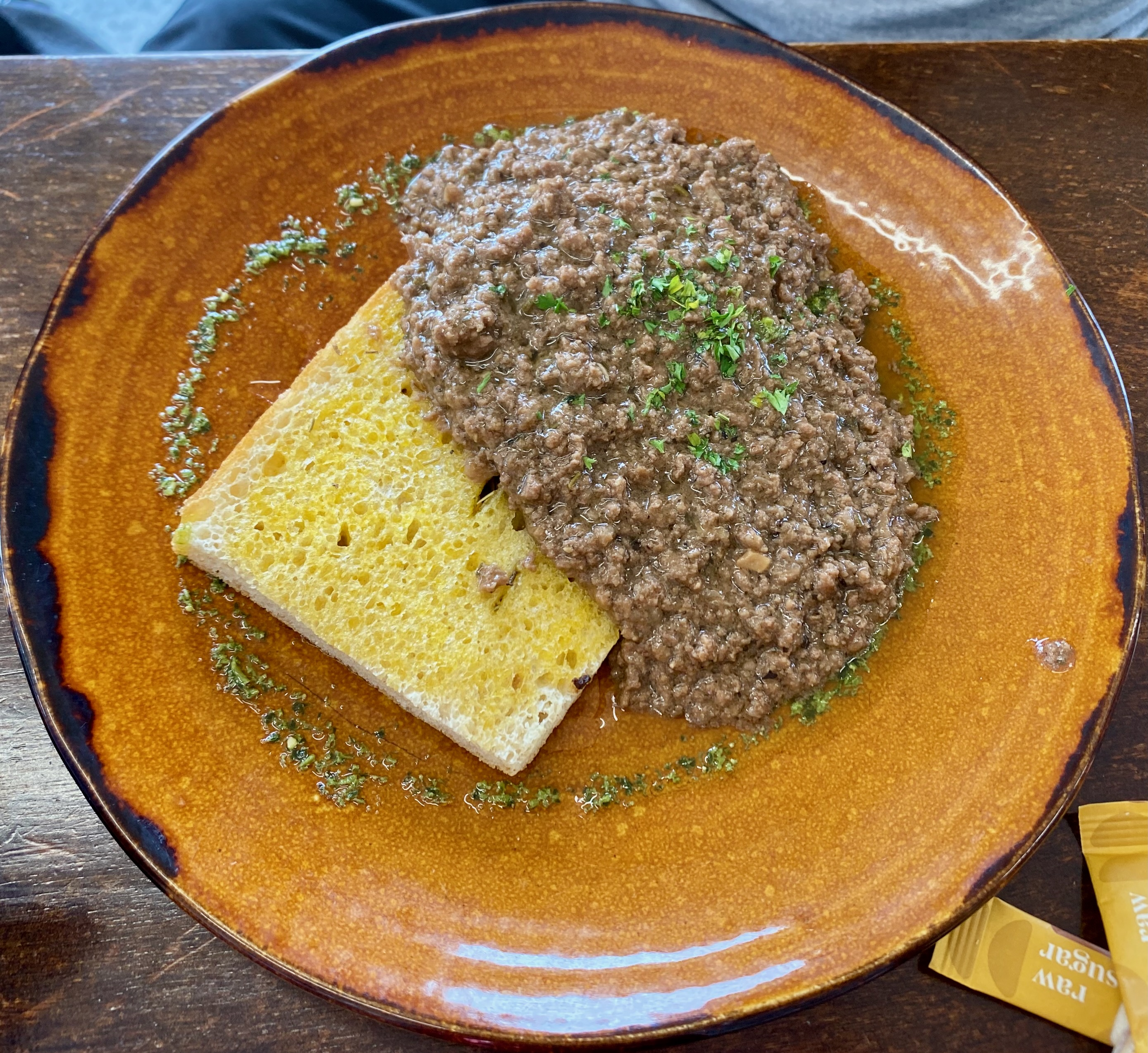
Mince on toast at a cafe in New Zealand

Mince on toast is a food item commonly served in New Zealand that consists of cooked minced meat on a slice of toasted bread. The minced meat is typically seasoned with garlic, onion and Worcestershire sauce.

New Zealand food writer Helen Jackson called the dish "an absolute rural classic". Modern versions of the dish may include a poached egg, grated cheese or sour cream, and one variant of the typical recipe was reported as having the mince fried in beef lard and garnished with watercress.

In 2017, American food website Eater described the dish as "quintessentially British", although this was subsequently rejected by news reports, with British food writers Jay Rayner and Nigella Lawson saying that it was not a popular British dish. The Guardian characterised the story as a "symbol for American misunderstandings about British culture".

== See also ==
- Filet américain
- Sloppy joe
- List of toast dishes
