= Soldiers (food) =

Thin strip of toasted bread

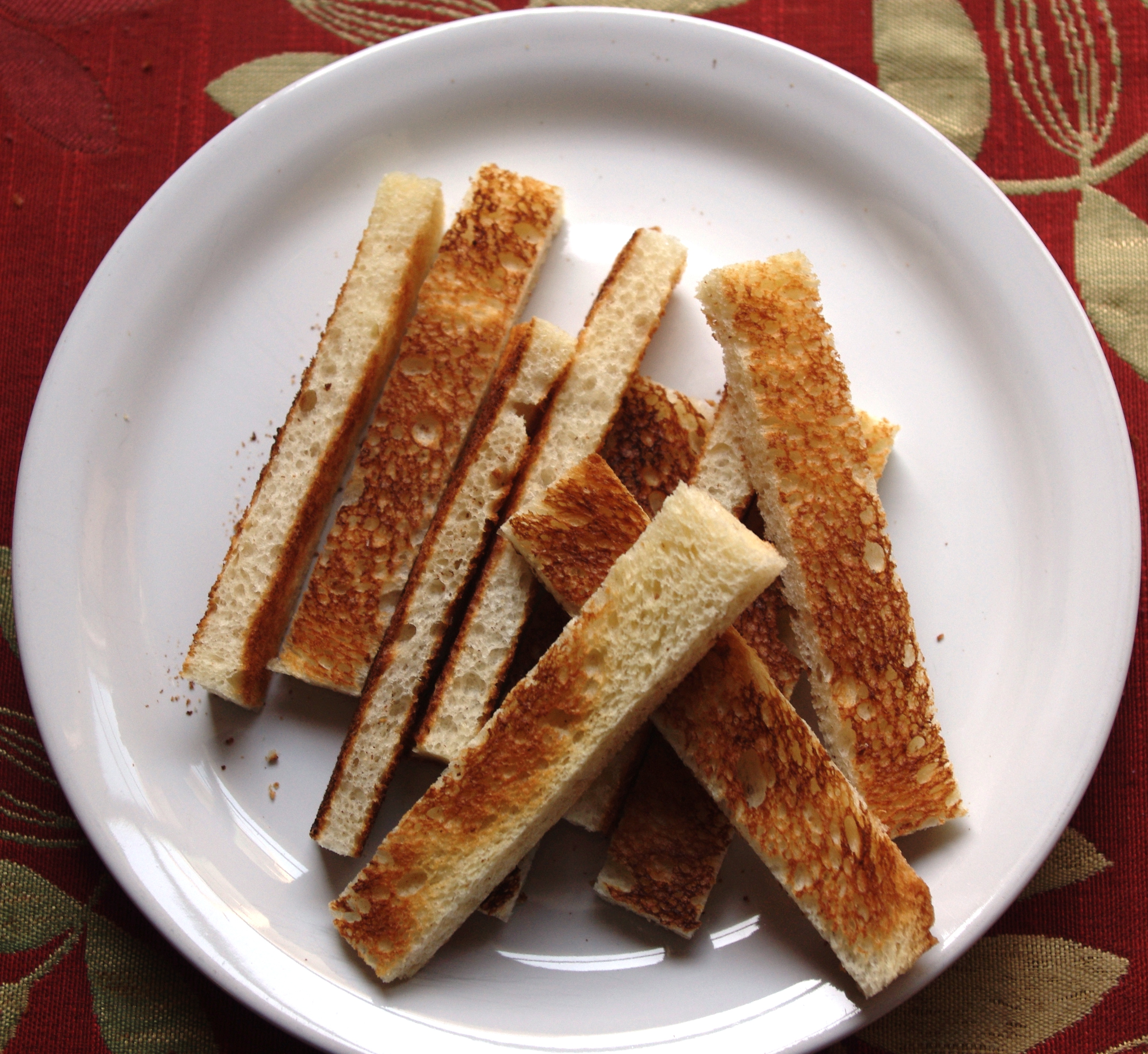
- Toast soldiers
- Alternative names: Fingers
- Type: Toast
- Place of origin: England

A soldier, toast soldier, or toast finger is a thin strip of toasted bread often dipped into a soft-boiled egg. The origins of the term "soldier" are uncertain, although various explanations have been proposed, including a supposed resemblance to soldiers standing in formation.

Bread dipped in a soft-boiled egg is documented in the 19th century, a particular use of a sop or sippet. Toast fingers are also dipped into soups and dips, and can serve as a base for canapés.

== History ==
There is an early reference from 1728 in England to a "garnish of fry'd Bread, cut the length of one's Finger", as an accompaniment to boiled tench.

In 1868 Alphonse Daudet mentions mouillettes: "A sa gauche, Annou lui taille des mouillettes pour ses oeufs, des oeufs du matin, blancs, crémeux, duvetés", and they are explicitly defined in a 1870s dictionary as "a small piece of bread, long and narrow, which one soaks in soft-boiled eggs".

Eating egg with a sippet in the US is described in a 1906 story and a 1913 etiquette article.

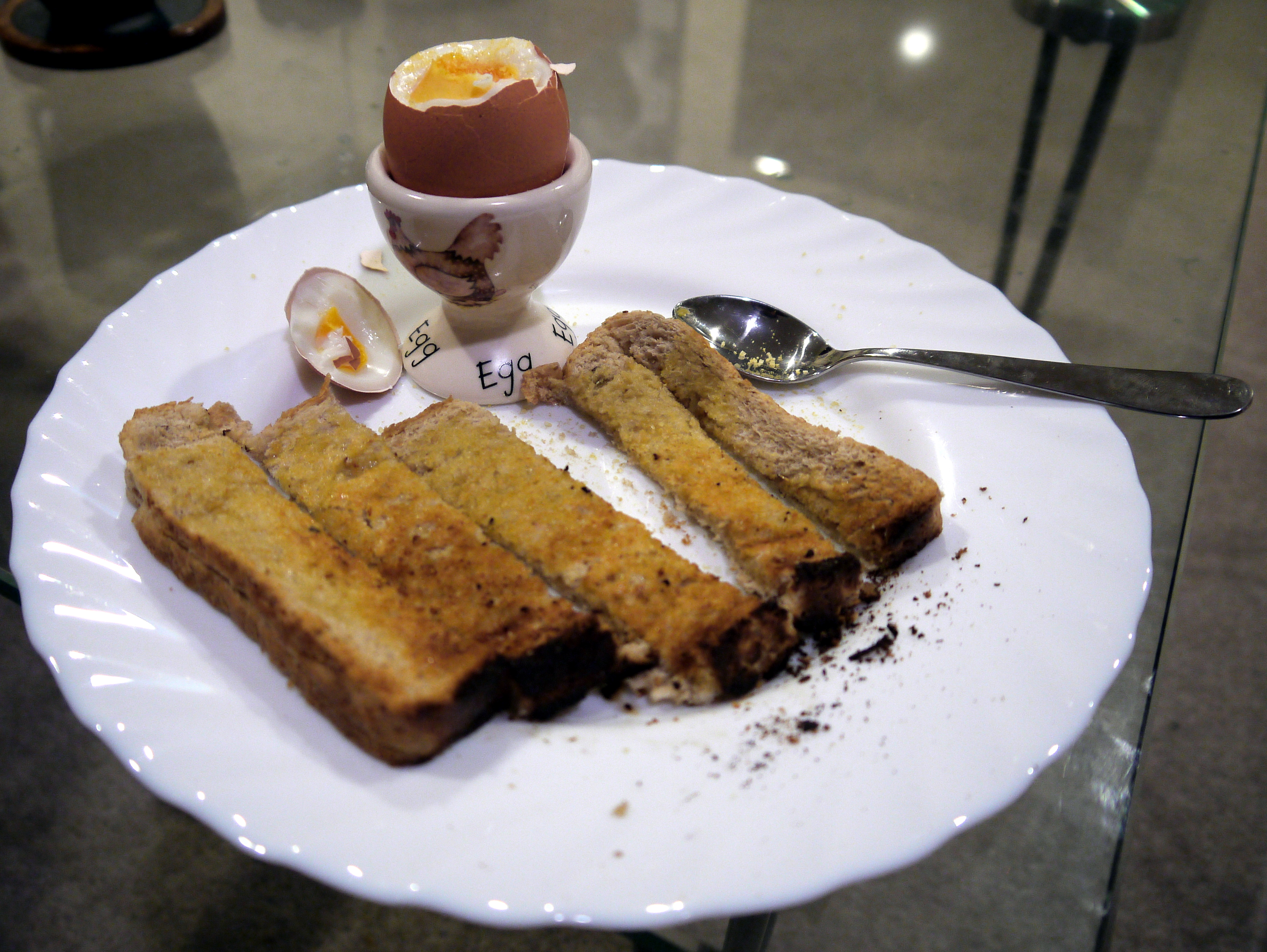
Boiled egg with soldiers

The specific English term "eggs with soldiers" appears to date from the 1960s. The modern phrase first appeared in print in 1966 in British writer Nicolas Freeling's novel The Dresden Green (where it is used to eat soup). It is possible that it was either popularised or invented in 1965 in a series of TV advertisements for eggs starring Tony Hancock and Patricia Hayes.

== Modern ==
There are novelty devices to cut bread into soldiers, sometimes in the shape of human soldiers.

== See also ==
- List of toast dishes
