= Tostada (toast) =

One of several Latin American toasted dishes

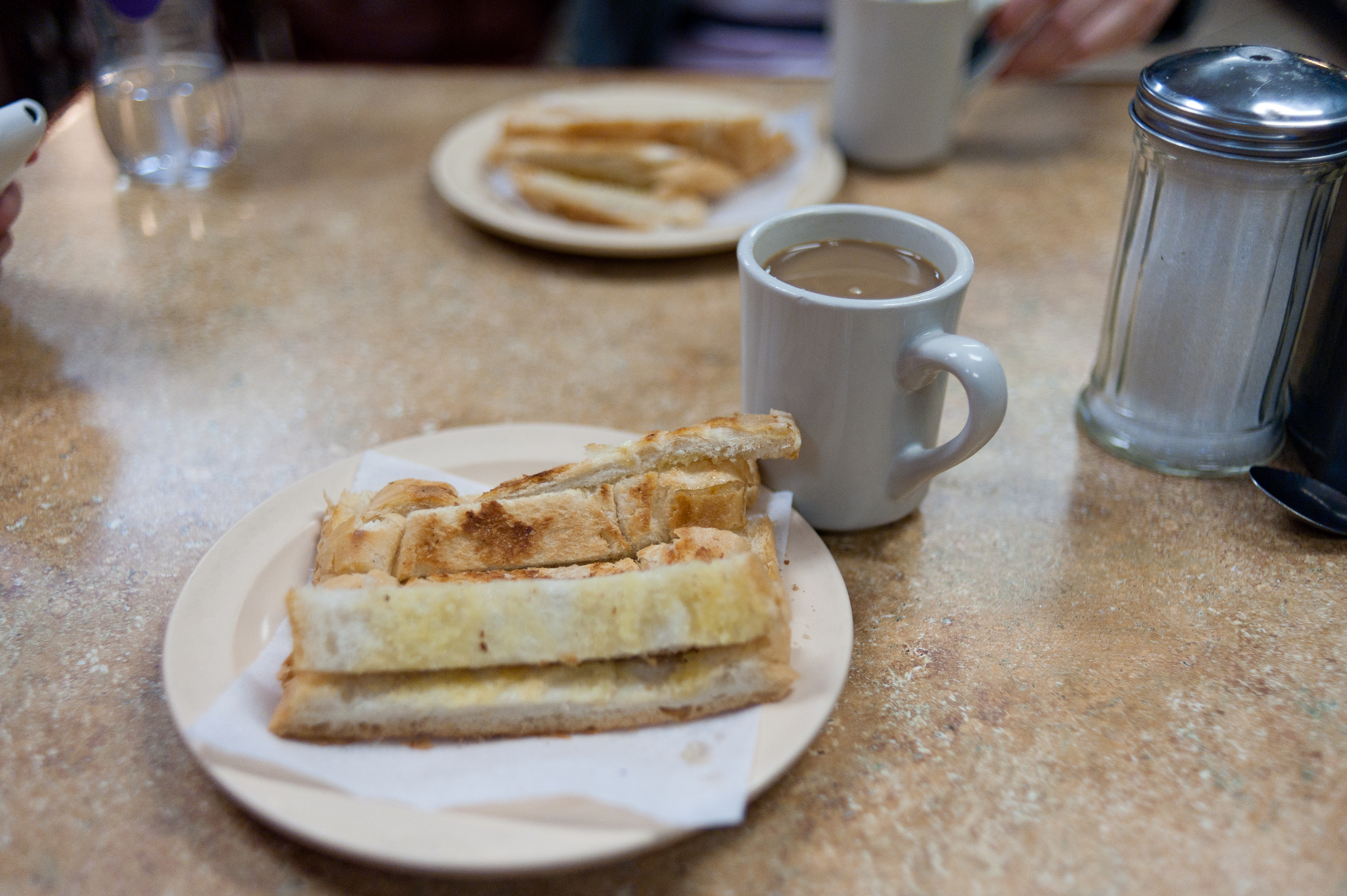
- Café con leche (coffee with milk) and tostadas in Puerto Rico
- Type: Bread
- Course: Breakfast
- Main ingredients: Bread

Tostada (/tɒˈstɑːdə/ or /toʊˈstɑːdə/; Spanish: [tosˈtaða]) is a Spanish word which literally means "toasted". It is used in some Hispanic American countries to name several different traditional local dishes which have in common that they are toasted or use a toasted ingredient as the main base of their preparation.

It is similar to the British rusk, German zwieback, and Italian fette biscottate.

== Cuban tostada ==
In Cuban cuisine, tostada refers to a slice of handmade Cuban bread, cut lengthwise, buttered, and pressed. The bread is similar to French bread or Italian bread and is usually made in long, baguette-like loaves. It is the Cuban equivalent of toast. Typically, tostadas are served as a breakfast alongside (and perhaps dunked into) a hot mug of cafe con leche (strong dark-roasted Cuban coffee with scalded milk).

== Mariana Island tostada ==
In the Mariana Islands, owing to their years as a Spanish colony, there is an uncommon tradition of the "tostada de agua," (literally, "toast of water"). This dish is made of a fried tortilla topped with minced seaweed, peppers, and meat (generally chopped shrimp, though many varieties exist). Anecdotally, the entire dish was wrapped like a burrito, dunked in sea water briefly (hence the reason of its name), to add salt, offsetting the intensity of the peppers, and then unrolled and cooked until the tortilla has hardened. It is then topped with cheese.

== Puerto Rican tostada ==
In Puerto Rico, a tostada is almost the same as the Cuban tostada, but uses a different type of bread. Is a buttered and pressed portion of a pan de agua. Pan de agua is a baguette style bread, very similar to the Philippine Pandesal or the Mexican Bolillo, optionally served with Swiss cheese. The term is also used for toasted slice of pre-sliced bread (tostada de pan especial), and for a local version of French toast, typical of Easter, consisting in milk-soaked bread, battered in egg and fried.

== See also ==
- Pão na chapa
- List of toast dishes
- Toast (disambiguation)
