= Isaac Toast =

Toast chain based in South Korea

- Native name: 이삭토스트
- Type: Restaurants
- Industry: Toast
- Founded: 2003
- Headquarters: South Korea
- Number of locations: 900 (2026)
- Website: isaac-toast.co.kr

Isaac Toast (Korean: 이삭토스트), is a toast (toasted sandwich) chain based in South Korea. As of 2026, the chain has over 900 retail stores in South Korea. It has further expanded internationally and established branches including Macau, Taiwan and Malaysia. Outlets in Singapore have closed.
