= Toast sandwich =

Sandwich with toast filling

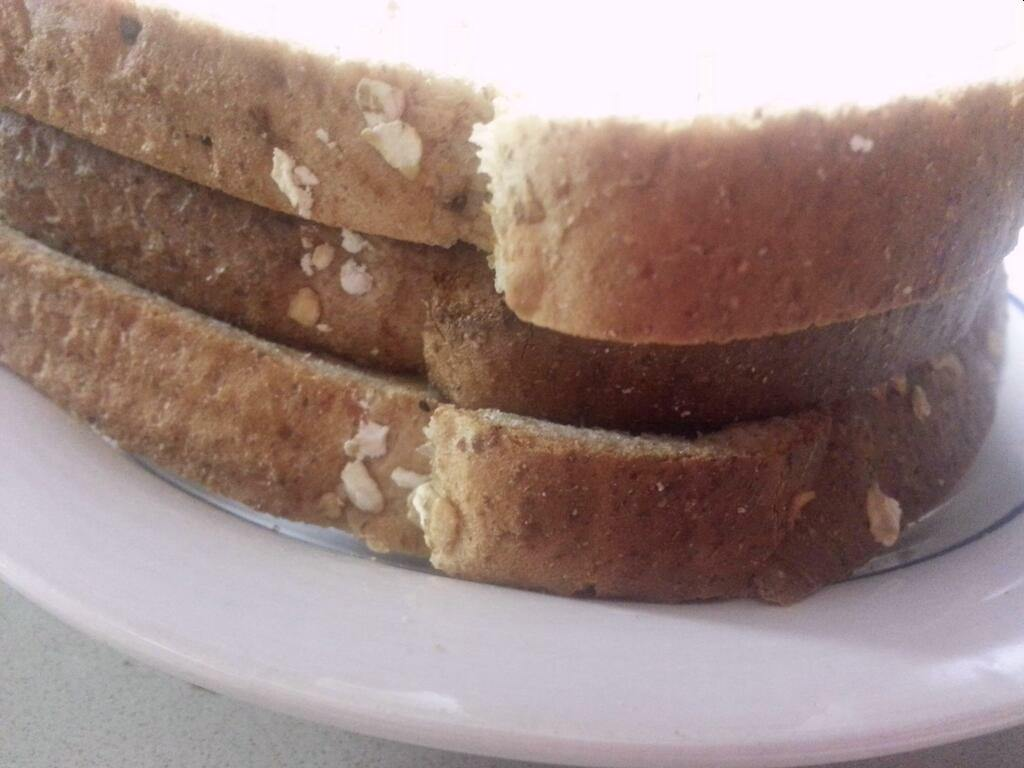
- A piece of toast sandwiched between two pieces of bread
- Type: Sandwich
- Place of origin: United Kingdom
- Region or state: England
- Main ingredients: Bread, toast, butter, salt, pepper
- Food energy (per serving): 330 kcal (1,400 kJ)

A toast sandwich (also known as a bread sandwich) is a sandwich in which the filling between two slices of bread is itself a thin slice of toasted bread, which may be buttered. An 1861 recipe says to add salt and pepper to taste.

== Victorian recipe ==
A recipe for toast sandwiches is included in the invalid cookery section of the 1861 Book of Household Management by Isabella Beeton, who adds, "This sandwich may be varied by adding a little pulled meat, or very fine slices of cold meat, to the toast, and in any of these forms will be found very tempting to the appetite of an invalid."

== Modern versions ==
In November 2011, the toast sandwich was recreated by the Royal Society of Chemistry in a tasting 150 years after the release of Beeton's Book of Household Management. The society sought to revive the forgotten dish in wake of the Great Recession after calculating the cost as low as £0.075 per sandwich. They named it "the country's most economical lunch", offering £200 (equivalent to £295.74 in 2025) to whoever could create a cheaper edible meal. Due to an overabundance of submissions, the offer was closed seven days later and the £200 given to a randomly selected entrant.

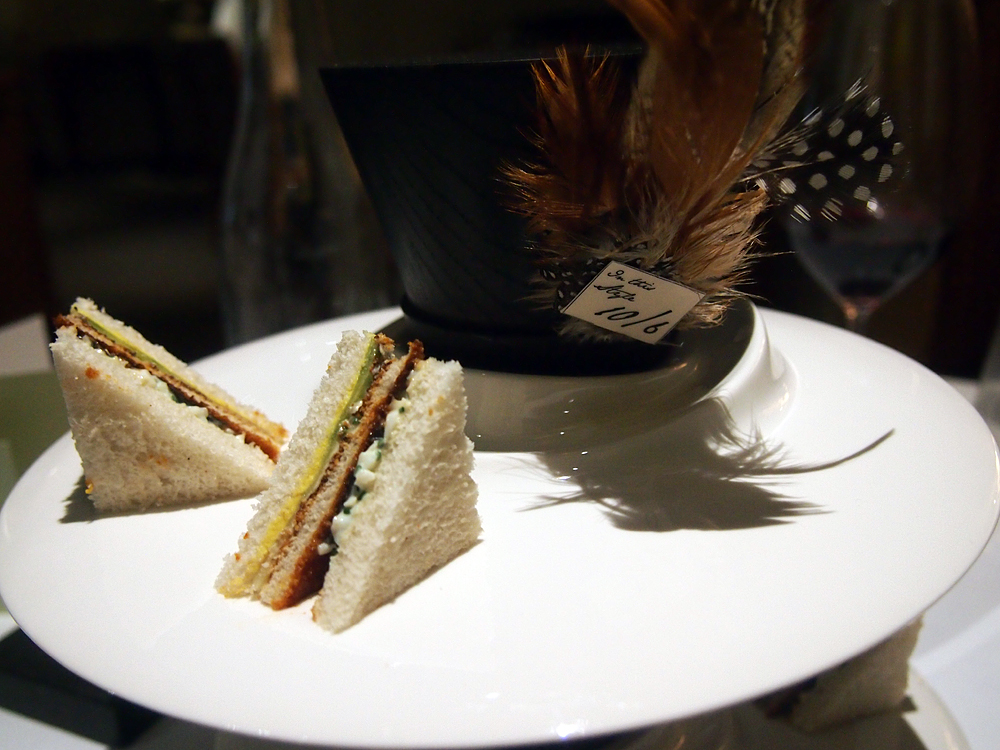
The toast sandwich served as a side dish at Heston Blumenthal's restaurant the Fat Duck

In Heston Blumenthal's restaurant the Fat Duck, 12 toast sandwiches are served as a side dish to the "Mad Hatter's Tea Party (circa 1892)", a main course inspired by Alice in Wonderland. Blumenthal's toast sandwich involves bone marrow salad, egg mustard mayo, truffle gastrique, and tomato ketchup.

== Media coverage ==
The Daily Meal article "12 Life-Changing Sandwiches You've Never Heard Of" said the toast sandwich was "just not that good ... Thankfully, the Dadaists didn't invent any more sandwiches after that." The A.V. Club's Mike Vago described it as an "extravagance of blandness".

The toast sandwich was discussed on The Leonard Lopate Show in an interview with The Sporkful's Dan Pashman. The host, Leonard Lopate, said, "it sounds weird to me". The game show panelists on NPR's Wait Wait... Don't Tell Me! each tried the toast sandwich in a 2011 episode. The host, Peter Sagal, said, "This is the culinary equivalent of a Rothko painting. Or it's like a sandwich by Marcel Duchamp! It questions the essence of sandwich and language both!" A toast sandwich was served to the comedian Romesh Ranganathan on a 2018 episode of the British comedy panel show QI. Although Ranganathan initially feigned insult, after trying it, he said it was enjoyable.

== See also ==
- List of bread dishes
- List of sandwiches
- List of toast dishes
