= Crouton =

Rebaked bread used as topping

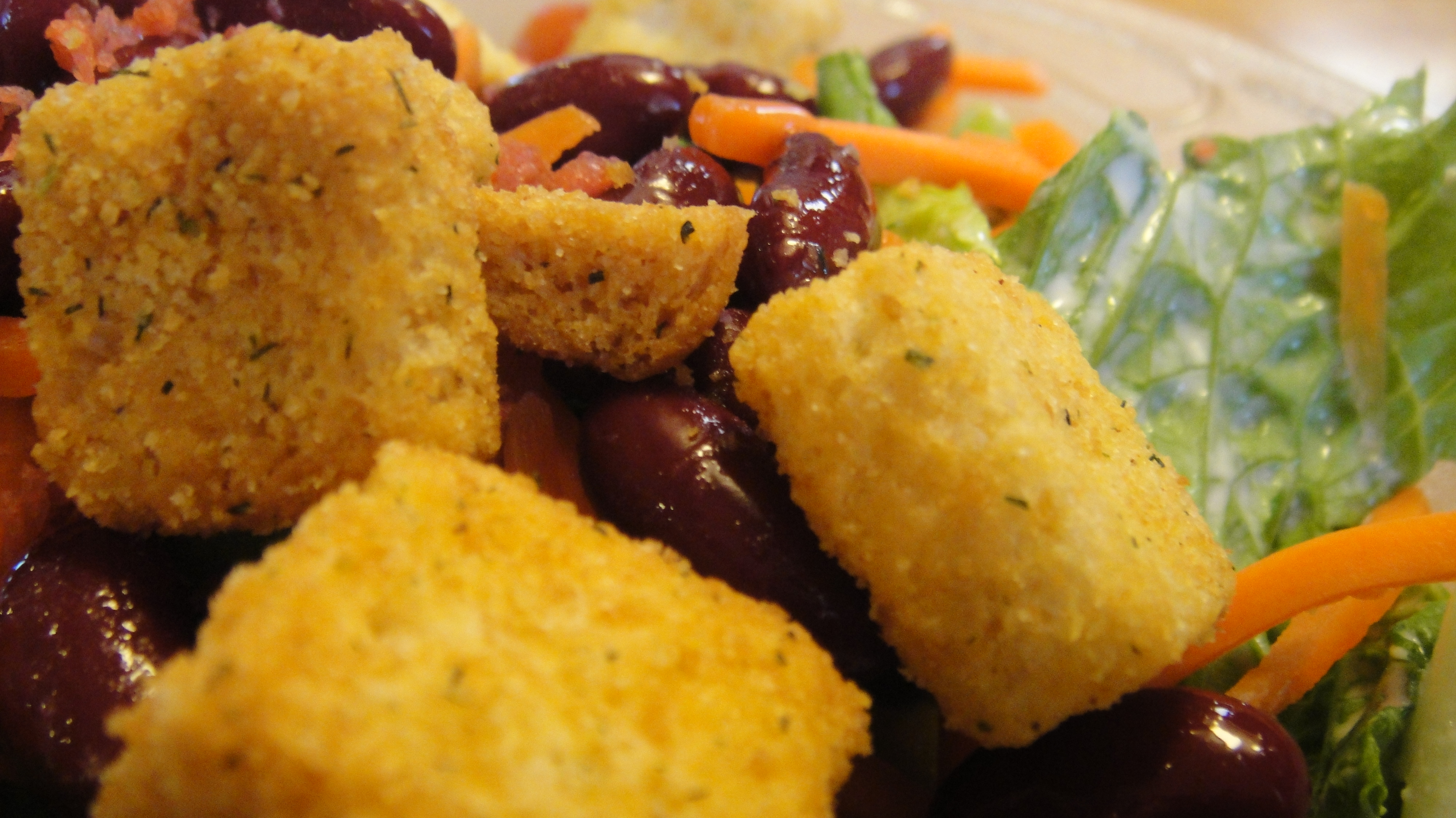
- Close-up of croutons on a salad
- Place of origin: France
- Main ingredients: Bread, oil or butter, seasonings
- Food energy (per 100 g serving): 420 kcal (1,800 kJ)

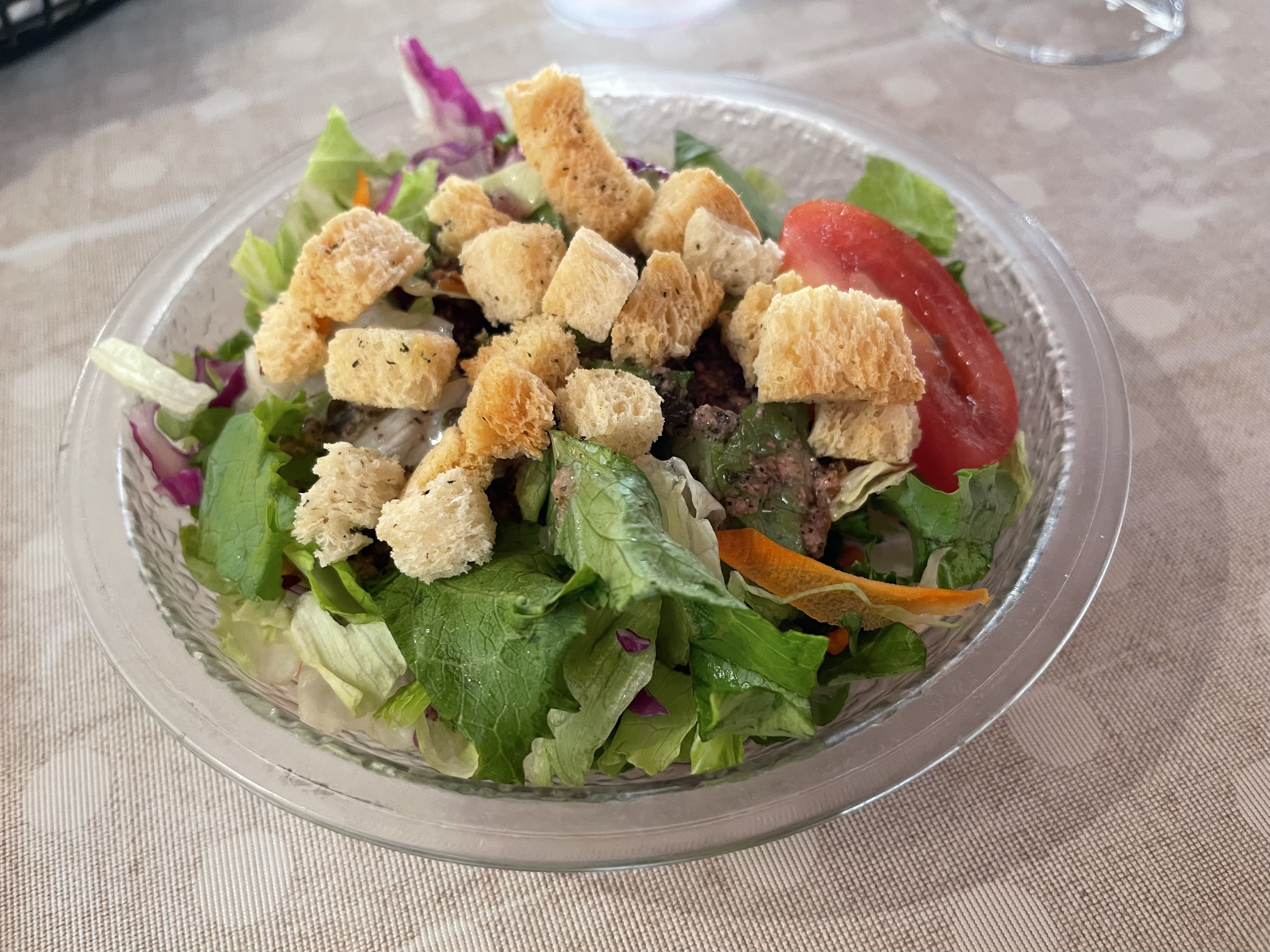
Croutons atop a salad

A crouton or croûton (/ˈkruːtɒn/) is a toasted or fried cube or slice of bread. Croutons are used in salads, as garnishes for soups and stews, and as a snack food.

Salad croutons are usually cubes. Slice-shaped croutons are a base for canapés. Formerly, salmis and other sauced meats were often served on slice-shaped croutons.

In American cuisine, cubic croutons are best known as elements of Caesar salad and as ingredients in bread stuffing.

== Etymology ==
The word crouton a borrowing from the French croûton, a diminutive of croûte 'crust'.

== Preparation ==
To make croutons, the bread, usually somewhat stale, is cut into cubes, slices, or batons (cf. soldier). They are usually lightly coated in oil or butter, sometimes seasoned, then fried or baked. Sometimes grated cheese is added.

Dry, stale, or leftover bread is usually used. Once prepared, the croutons remain fresh longer than fresh bread.

== Gastronomy ==
A dish prepared à la Grenobloise 'in the Grenoble manner' has a garnish of small croutons along with beurre noisette, capers, parsley, and lemon.

Dried, cubed, and seasoned bread is commonly sold in large bags in North America to make Thanksgiving holiday stuffing; this version does not normally include added fat.

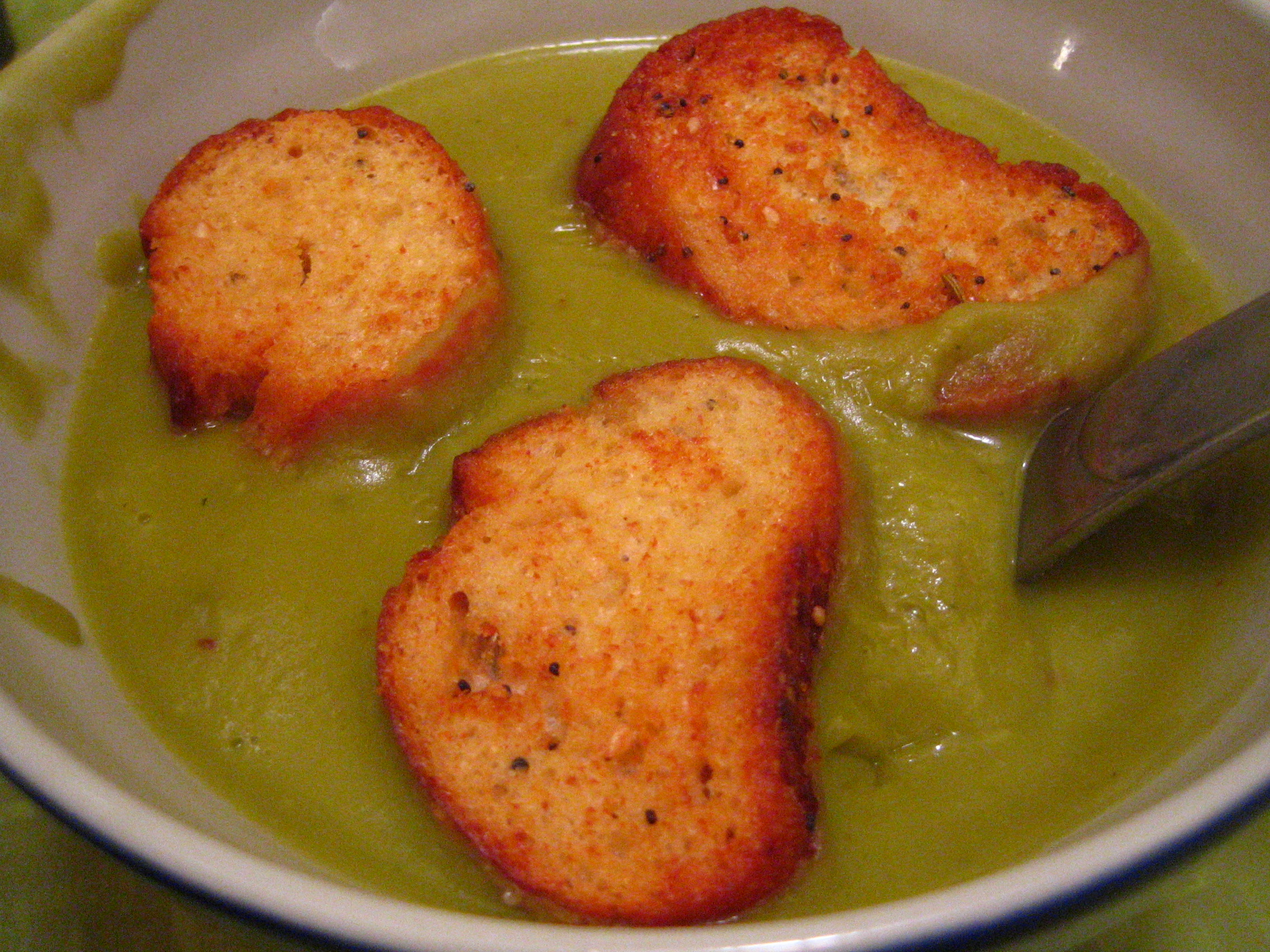
Large croutons in a soup

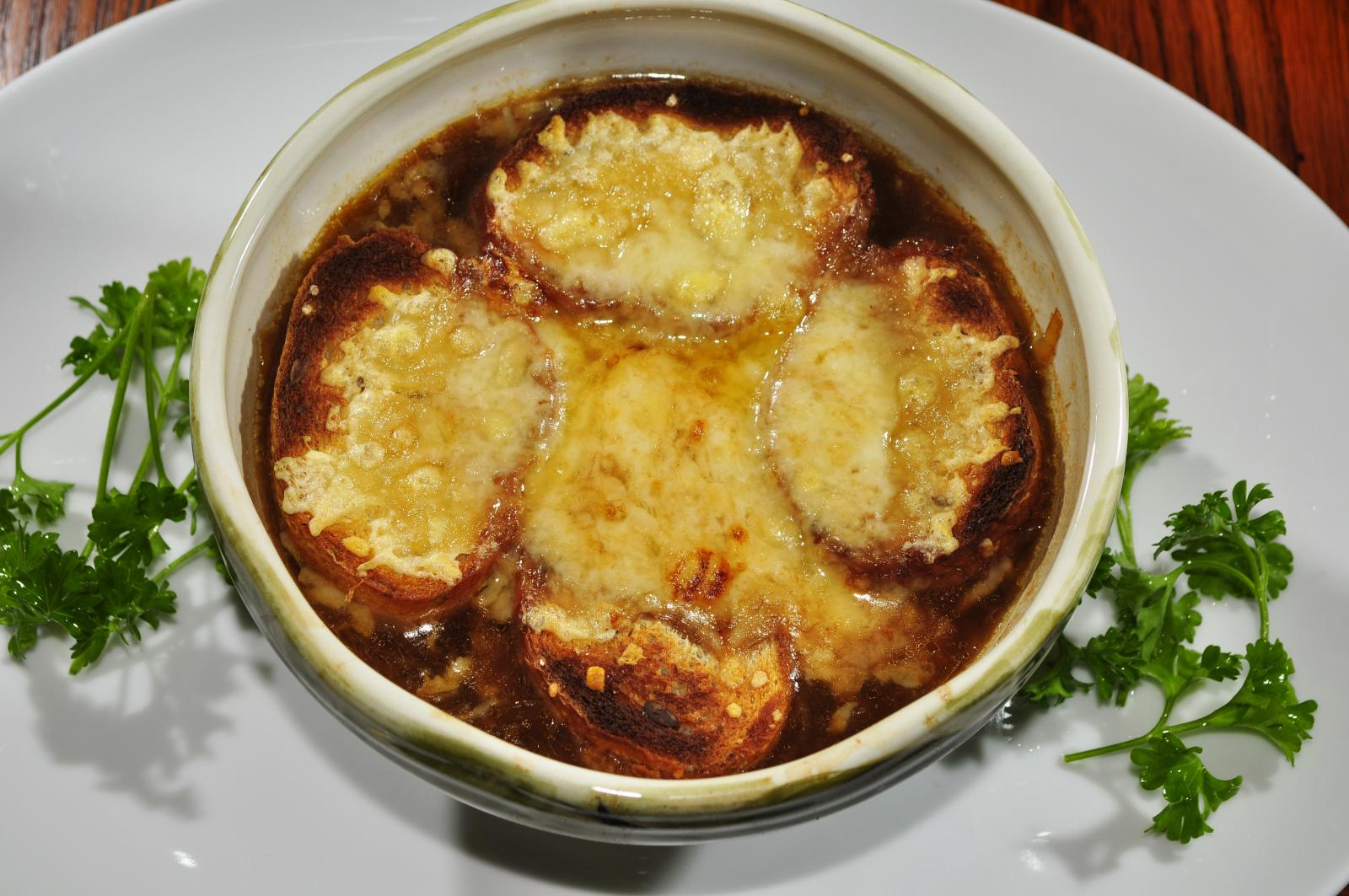
Cheese-covered croutons in an onion soup

== See also ==
- Bruschetta
- Crostini
- Garlic bread
- List of bread dishes
