= Toast (food) =

Bread that has been exposed to dry heat

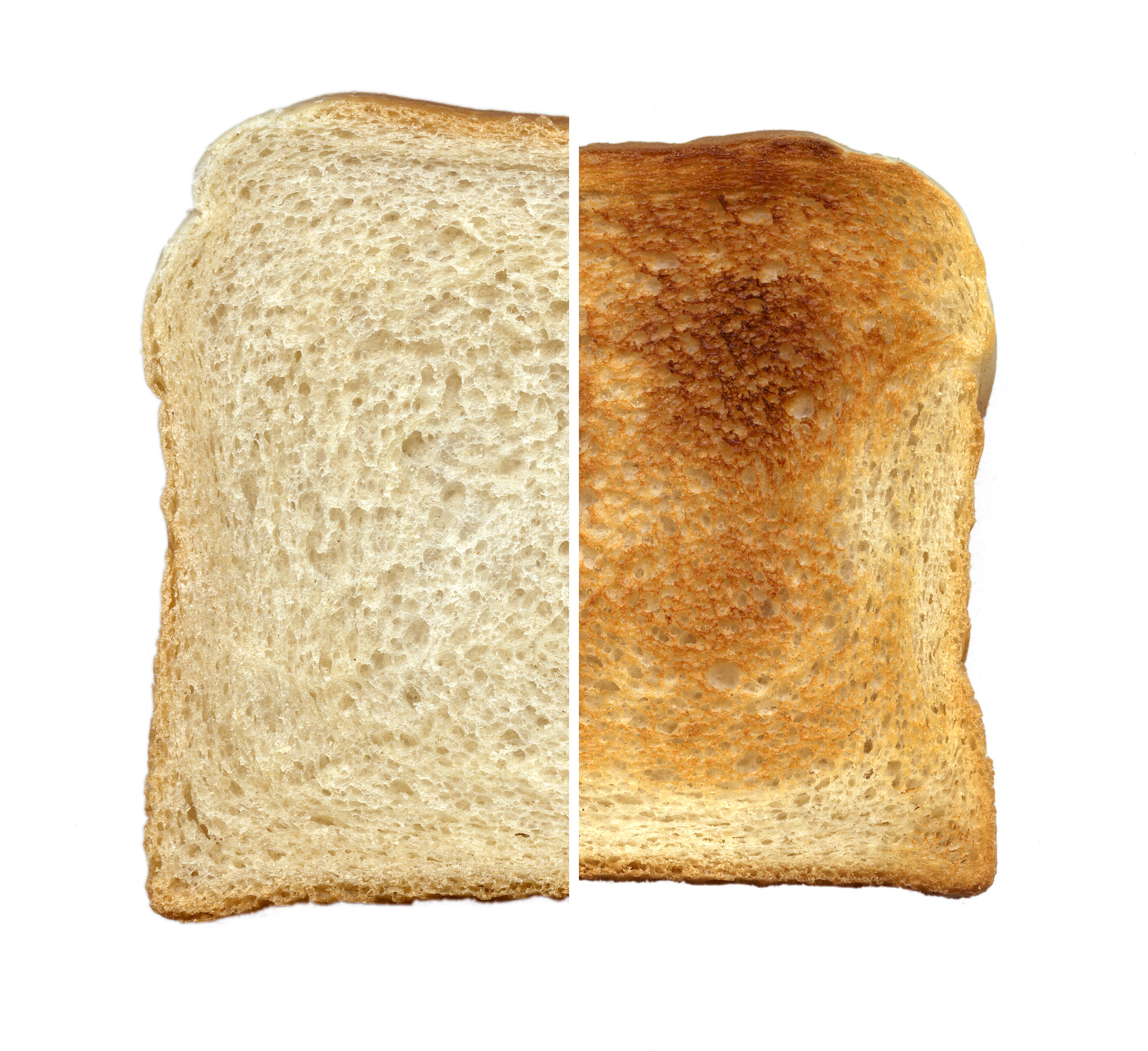
- A slice of bread, before and after toasting
- Type: Bread
- Serving temperature: Toasted
- Main ingredients: Sliced bread

Toast is sliced bread that has been browned by radiant heat. The browning is the result of a Maillard reaction altering the flavor of the bread and making it crispier in texture. The firm surface is easier to spread toppings on and the warmth can help spreads such as butter reach their melting point. Toasting is a common method of making stale bread more palatable. Bread is commonly toasted using devices specifically designed for such, e.g., a toaster or a toaster oven. Toast may contain more acrylamide, caused by the browning process, which is suspected to be a carcinogen. However, claims that acrylamide in burnt food causes cancer have not been proven.

Butter or margarine, and sweet toppings, such as jam, marmalade or jelly, are commonly spread on toast. Regionally, savory spreads, such as peanut butter or yeast extract, may also be popular. Toast may accompany savory dishes such as soups or stews, or it can be topped with ingredients like eggs or baked beans to make a light meal. Toast is a common breakfast food. A sandwich may also use toasted bread.

== Etymology and history ==
The word toast comes from Latin torrere 'to burn'. In German, the term (or sometimes Toastbrot) also refers to the type of bread itself, which is usually used for toasting.

One of the first references to toast in print is in a recipe for Oyle Soppys (flavoured onions stewed in a gallon of stale beer and a pint of oil) from 1430. Toasting was likely first used to increase the edibility of bread that had become slightly stale. In the 1400s and 1500s, toast was discarded or eaten after it was used as a flavoring for drinks. In the 1600s toast was still thought of as something to be put into drinks. William Shakespeare in his play The Merry Wives of Windsor (1602) gives John Falstaff the line "Go fetch me a quart of sack; put a toast in't." Toast has been used as an element of American haute cuisine since at least the 1850s.

== Preparation ==
Bread sold ready-sliced is commonly used in modern preparations; some of these specifically market their suitability for toasting.

=== Cooking parameters ===
Toasting is a cooking process that depends on the occurrence of the Maillard reaction on the surface of the bread. The Maillard reaction only occurs when foods reach temperatures in excess of 155 °C (310 °F). Generally the toasting process is complete once the surface temperature of the toast is between 155 °C and 190 °C, depending on the desired surface color. Above these temperatures, toast will exude a burnt odor, which is associated with pyruvic aldehyde until it eventually ignites at 250 °C (482 °F).

=== Appliances ===
==== Toasters ====
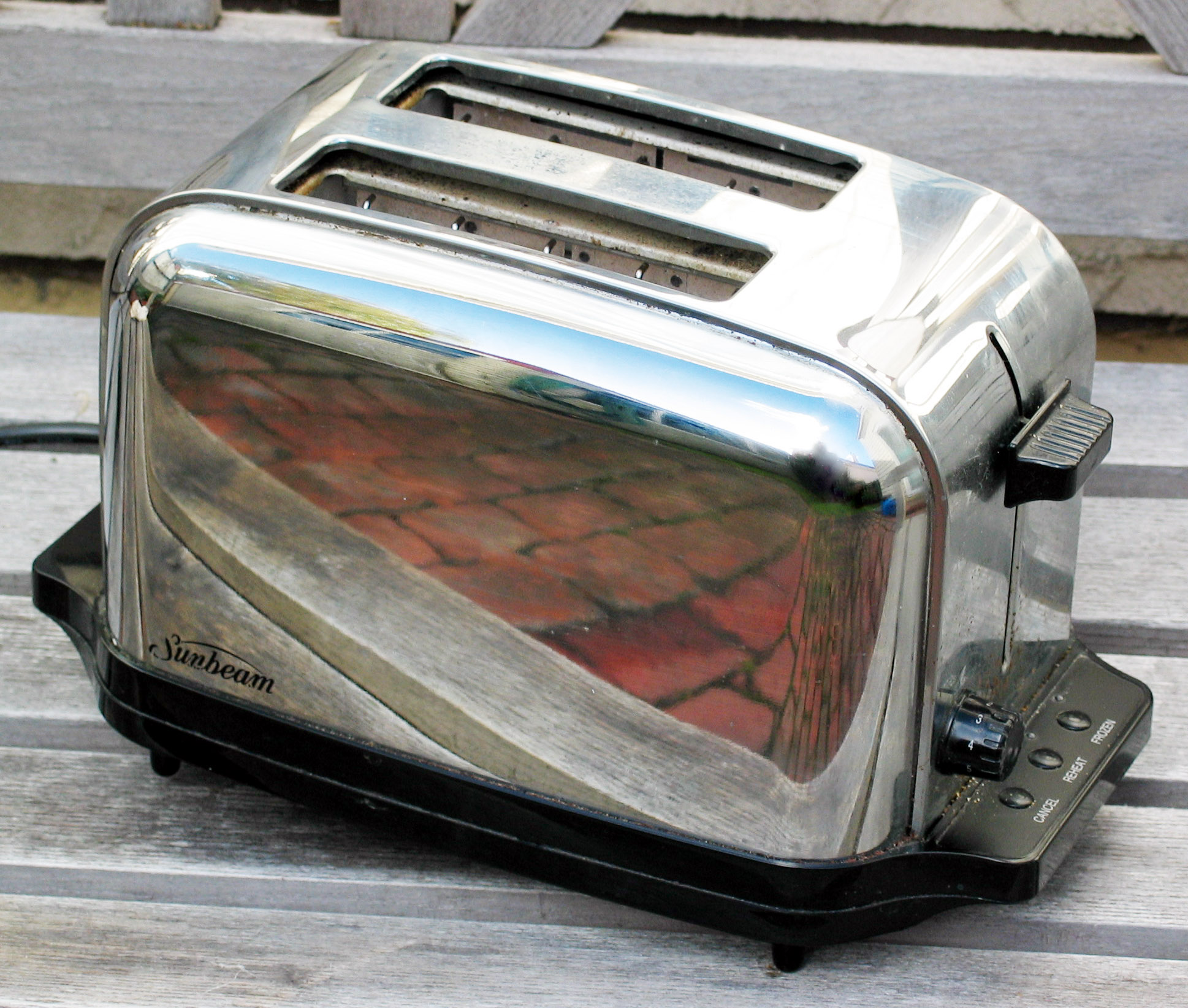
A classic two-slot toaster

In a modern home kitchen, toast is usually made in a special-purpose electrical appliance, a toaster. Sliced bread is placed into the slots on the top of the toaster, the desired degree of toasting is set, and a lever is pushed down to expose the bread to the heated elements. The toast is popped up when it is ready. Bread toasted in a conventional toaster can "sweat" when it is served (i.e. water collects on the surface of the cooled toast). This occurs because moisture in the bread becomes steam while being toasted due to heat and when cooled the steam condenses into water droplets on the surface of the bread.

Bread can also be toasted under a medium-hot grill. Hotels, restaurants, and other food service locations often use a conveyor toaster, with heating elements both above and below the slices of bread, which are carried slowly between the red-hot elements by a metal conveyor belt, making toast continuously.

Toaster ovens are special small appliances made for toasting bread or heating small amounts of other foods.

==== Alternative preparations ====
Bread can be toasted under a grill (or broiler). "Oven toast" can be prepared in an open oven, or laid on an oven rack, usually buttered before toasting. It can also be made by heating bread in a skillet or pan. Bread can also be toasted by holding it near, but not directly over, an open flame or red-hot coals, such as a campfire or fireplace with a toasting fork or equivalent implement. It is also possible to make toast using an air fryer.

== Consumption ==
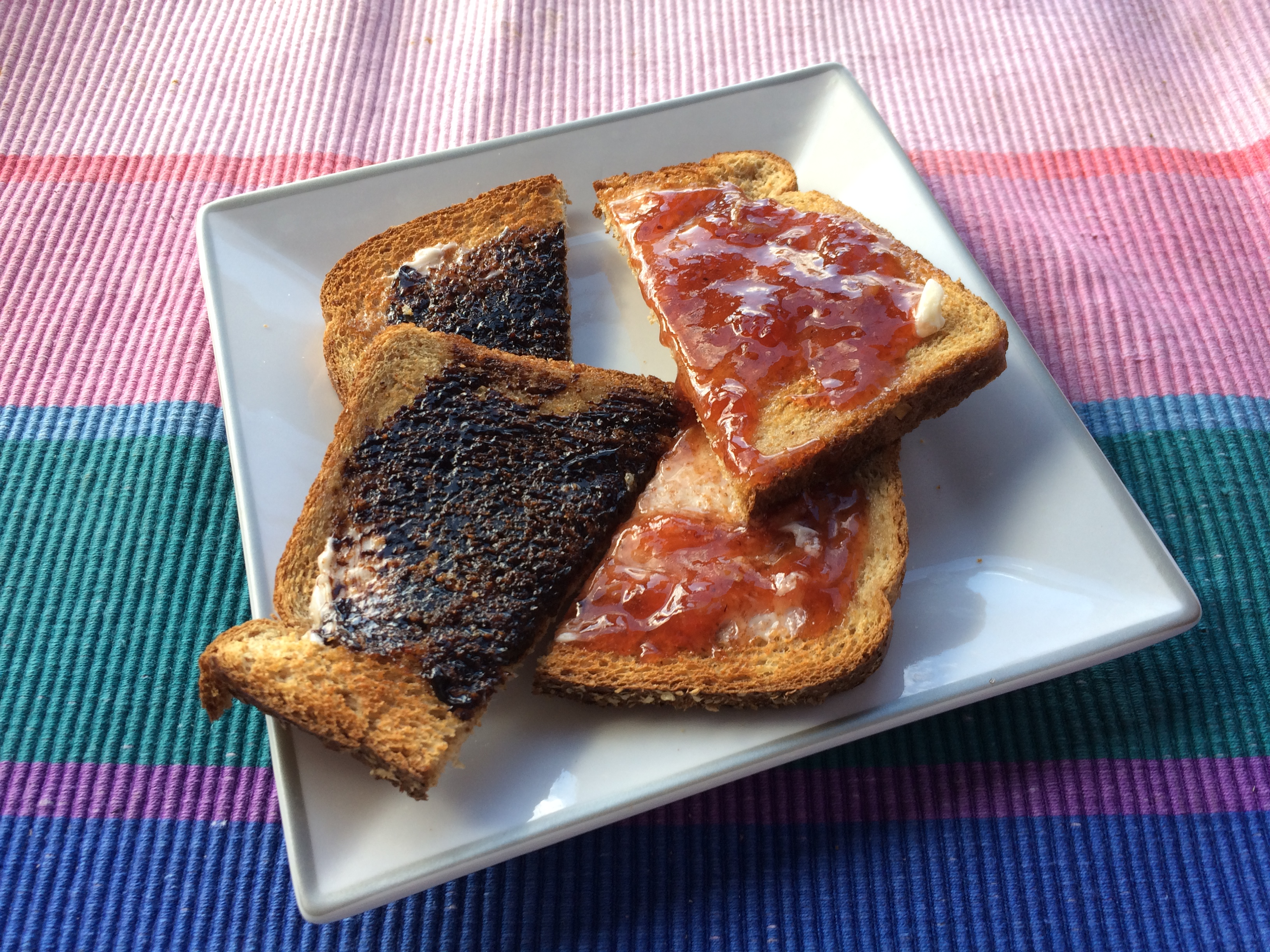
Left: Toast with butter and Vegemite. Right: With butter and strawberry jam.

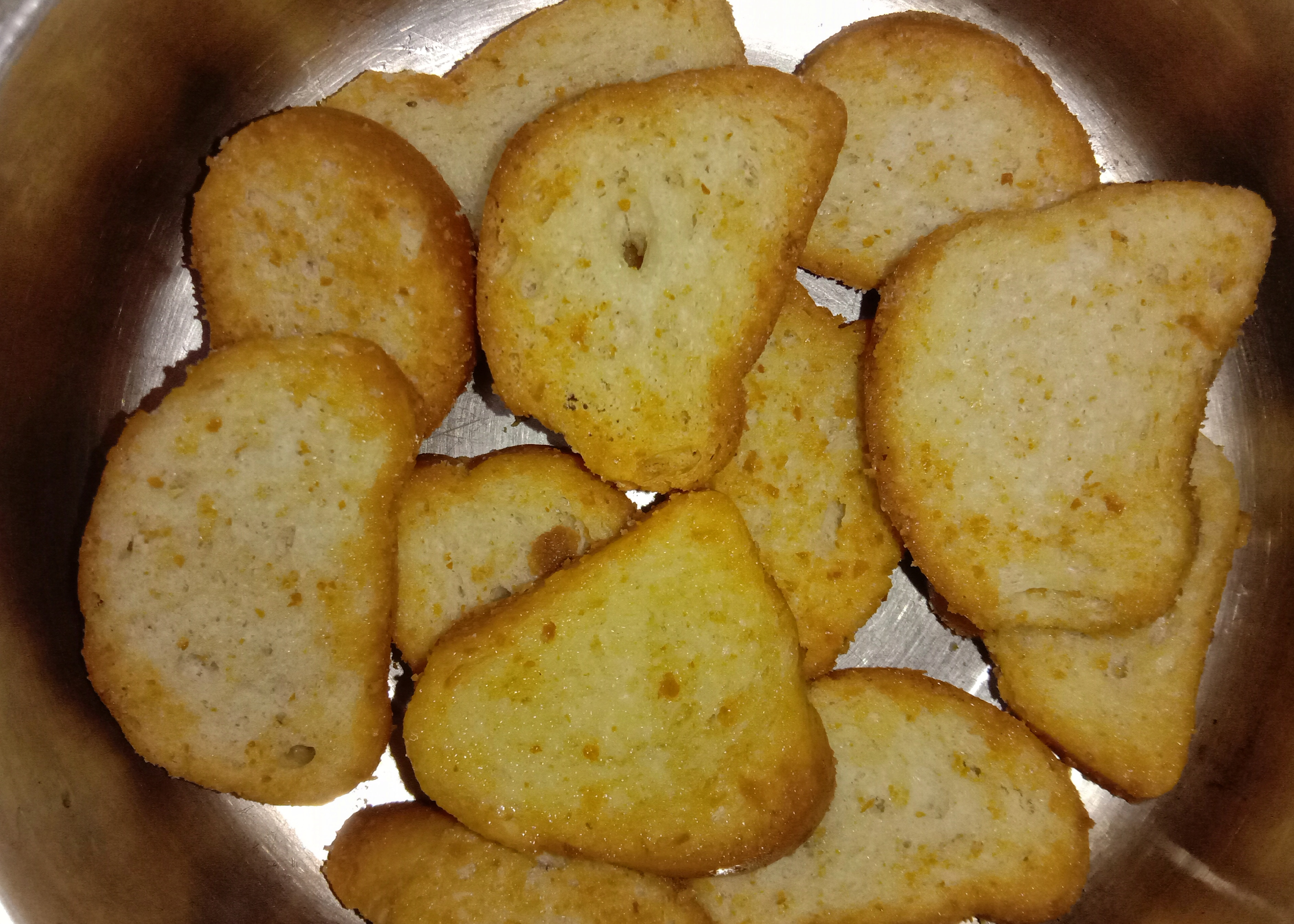
Toasted bread slices in West Bengal, India, used during teatime

Toast is most commonly eaten with butter or margarine spread over it, and may be served with preserves, spreads, or other toppings in addition to or instead of butter. Toast with jam or marmalade is popular. Other condiments eaten with toast include chocolate spread, cream cheese, and peanut butter. Yeast extracts such as Marmite in the UK, New Zealand and South Africa, and Vegemite in Australia are considered national traditions. Some sandwiches, such as the BLT, call for toast to be used rather than bread, while the toast sandwich uses toast itself as a filling between slices of untoasted bread.

Toast is an important component of many breakfasts. In the United Kingdom toast is part of a traditional breakfast: it may be incorporated in a full breakfast or eaten with baked beans. A dish popular there with children is eggs and soldiers. Strips of toast (the soldiers) are dipped into the runny yolk of a soft-boiled egg through a hole made in the top of the eggshell.

Toast is also used in some traditional bland specialty diets for people with gastrointestinal problems such as diarrhea. This is because toasting breaks down the starch in the bread and makes it easier to digest.

In southern Sri Lanka, it is common for toast to be paired with a curry soup and mint tea. In Japan, people like to toast thick slices of bread. Toast became a staple dish in Japan after World War II, especially after it was introduced in school lunches throughout the country due to the shortage of rice. Thick slices of toasted bread are also eaten in regions of the United States where they are known as Texas toast. Street vendors in South Korea serve toast with a variety of toppings, usually fried eggs, vegetables and slices of meat, topped with sauces. Korean toast is eaten as a sandwich. In Southeast Asia, coconut jam is a popular spread for toast. Avocado toast is seen as a symbol of millennial culture.

By 2013, "artisanal toast" had become a significant food trend in upscale American cities like San Francisco, where some commentators decried the increasing number of restaurants and bakeries selling freshly made toast at what was perceived to be an unreasonably high price.

== Nutrition and health ==
=== Comparison with fresh bread ===
Toasting bread and allowing Maillard browning to occur has been shown in numerous studies to have an impact on the nutritional value of bread. Examples of nutrients that have been shown to change consist of:

- Thiamine, or vitamin B_{1}, has been shown to decrease in concentration in bread after it has been toasted.
- Lysine, an essential amino acid, has also been found to decrease in concentration after bread is toasted.
- Dietary fiber has been shown to increase in mass concentration significantly after toasting.

The nutritive loss of substances such as lysine results in a substantial reduction of the protein efficiency ratio (PER) of the bread.

=== Carcinogens ===
Toasted bread may contain benzo[a]pyrene and high levels of acrylamide, a carcinogen generated during the browning process. High acrylamide levels can also be found in other heated carbohydrate-rich foods. The darker the surface colour of the toast, the higher its concentration of acrylamide. The British Food Standards Agency recommended that bread should be toasted to the lightest colour acceptable, later modified to "aim for a golden yellow colour or lighter when frying, baking, toasting or roasting starchy foods". Epidemiological studies available as of 2019 suggested that it was unlikely that dietary acrylamide consumption increased the risk of developing cancer.

== Cultural references ==
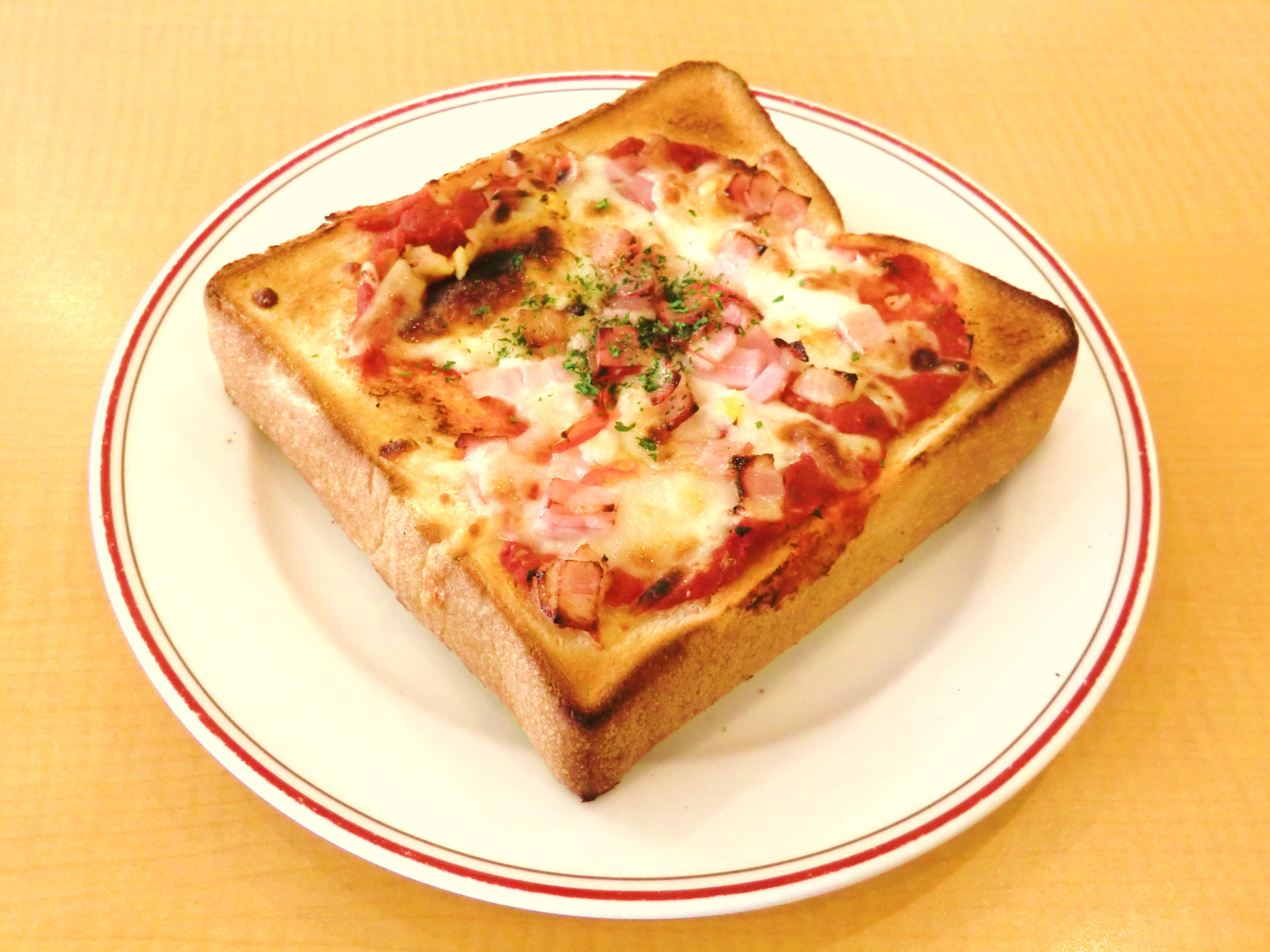
Pizza toast

Another popular idiom associated with the word "toast" is the expression "to toast someone's health", which is typically done by one or more persons at a gathering by raising a glass in salute to the individual. This meaning is derived from the early meaning of "toast", which from the 1400s to the 1600s meant warmed bread that was placed in a drink. By the 1700s, there were references to the drink in which toast was dunked being used in a gesture that indicates respect: "Ay, Madam, it has been your Life's whole Pride of late to be the Common Toast of every Public Table."

The slang idiom "you're toast", "I'm toast", or "we're toast" is used to express a state of being "outcast", "finished", "burned, scorched, wiped out, [or] demolished" (without even the consolation of being remembered, as with the slang term "you're history")." The first known use of "toast" as a metaphorical term for "you're dead" was in the film Ghostbusters (1984), in which Bill Murray's character Peter Venkman declares, "This chick is toast", before the Ghostbusters attempt to burn the villain with their nuclear-powered weapons. "Hey, dude. You're toast, man", which appeared in The St. Petersburg Times of October 1, 1987, is the "...earliest [printed] citation the Oxford English Dictionary research staff has of this usage." In cannabis slang, to be "toasted" is to experience cannabis intoxication.

Humorous observations have been made about buttered toast. It has been noted that buttered toast has a perceived tendency, when dropped, to land with the buttered side to the floor, the least desirable outcome. Although the concept of "dropped buttered toast" was originally a pessimistic joke, a 2001 study of the buttered toast phenomenon found that when dropped from a table, a buttered slice of toast landed butter-side down at least 62% of the time. The phenomenon is widely believed to be attributable to the combination of the size of the toast and the height of the typical dining table, which means that the toast will not rotate far enough to right itself before encountering the floor. A joke that plays on this tendency is the buttered cat paradox; if cats always land on their feet and buttered toast always lands buttered side down, it questions what happens when buttered toast is attached to a cat's back.

A more recent cultural phenomenon is the popularity of avocado toast, which is toast spread with mashed avocado. It is associated with the Millennial generation in particular as a stereotypical food consumed by that group.

== Other foods which are toasted ==
Cheese and marshmallows are also toasted by exposure to radiant heat. A toasted cheese sandwich melts the cheese and toasts the bread. Bagels, English muffins, Pop-Tart pastries, and crumpets can also be toasted.

== See also ==
- Bruschetta
- Crouton
- French toast
- Fried bread
- Honey toast
- Kaya toast
- List of toast dishes
- List of bread dishes
- Panino
- Pain de mie
- Roti bakar
- Toast rack
- Tostada
