= Fried bread =

Slice of bread that has been fried

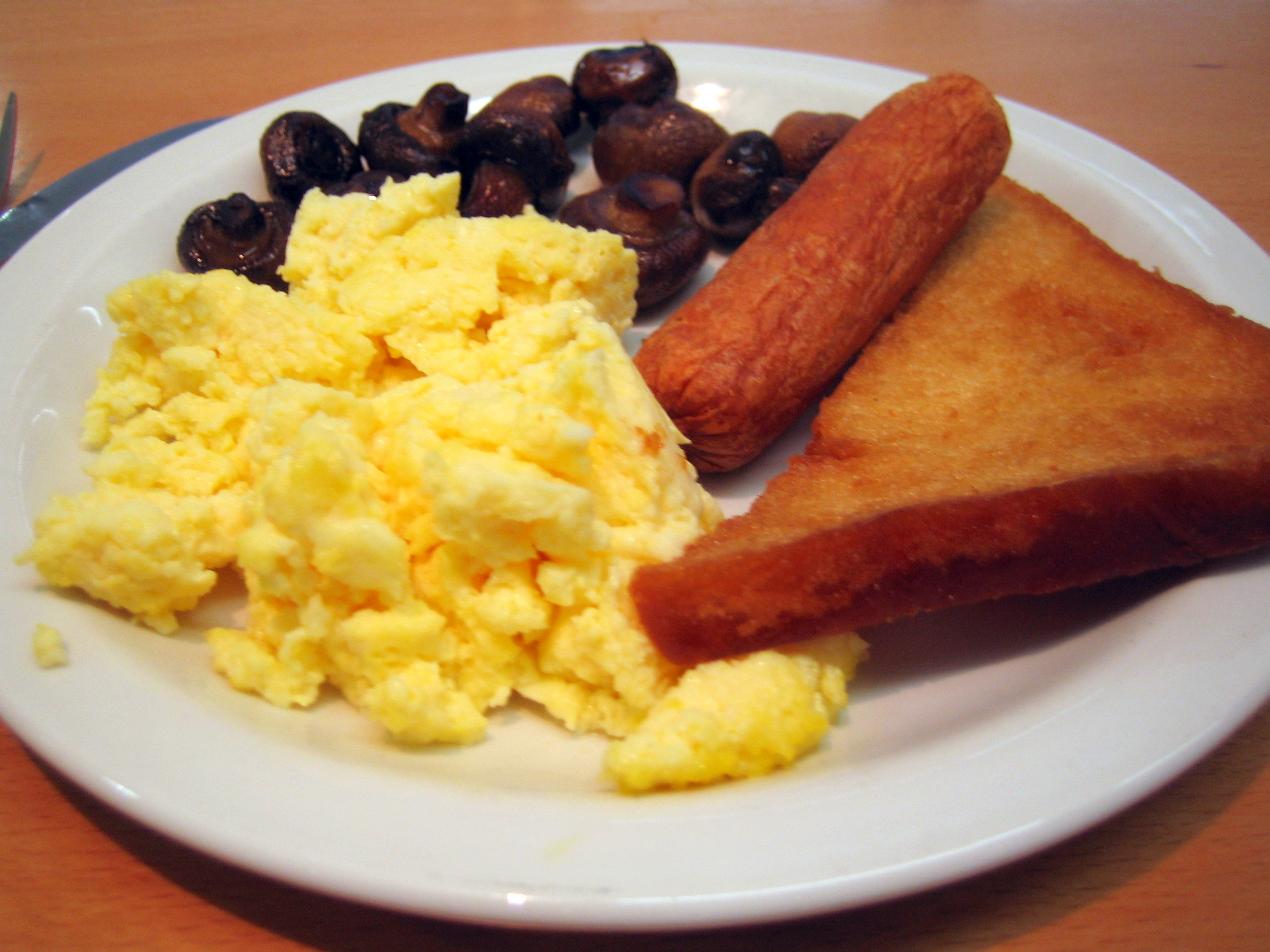
- Fried bread as part of a cooked breakfast with sausage, scrambled eggs and sautéed mushrooms
- Alternative names: Fried slice
- Type: Bread
- Course: Side
- Place of origin: Worldwide
- Serving temperature: Warm
- Main ingredients: Bread
- Food energy (per serving): 174 kcal (730 kJ)

Fried bread is a slice of bread that has been fried. It is used as a substitute for toast in various dishes or meals. Various oils, butter, lard, bacon drippings, or ghee can be used. Some cooks may choose to fry rather than toast to avoid having to give counter or storage space to or spend money on a toaster. Proponents of frying rather than toasting call out the extra flavor and crispiness that can be achieved by frying in fat rather than dry-toasting.

French toast is a type of fried bread that is coated in an egg and milk batter before frying.

== Around the world ==
Multiple cuisines include a dish that involves frying sliced bread.

=== Brazil ===
Rabanada is a dish imported from Portugal and popular in Brazil as a Christmas dish.

=== Czech Republic ===
Topinky or topinka is a Czech dish of pan-fried bread used to prevent wasting stale bread.

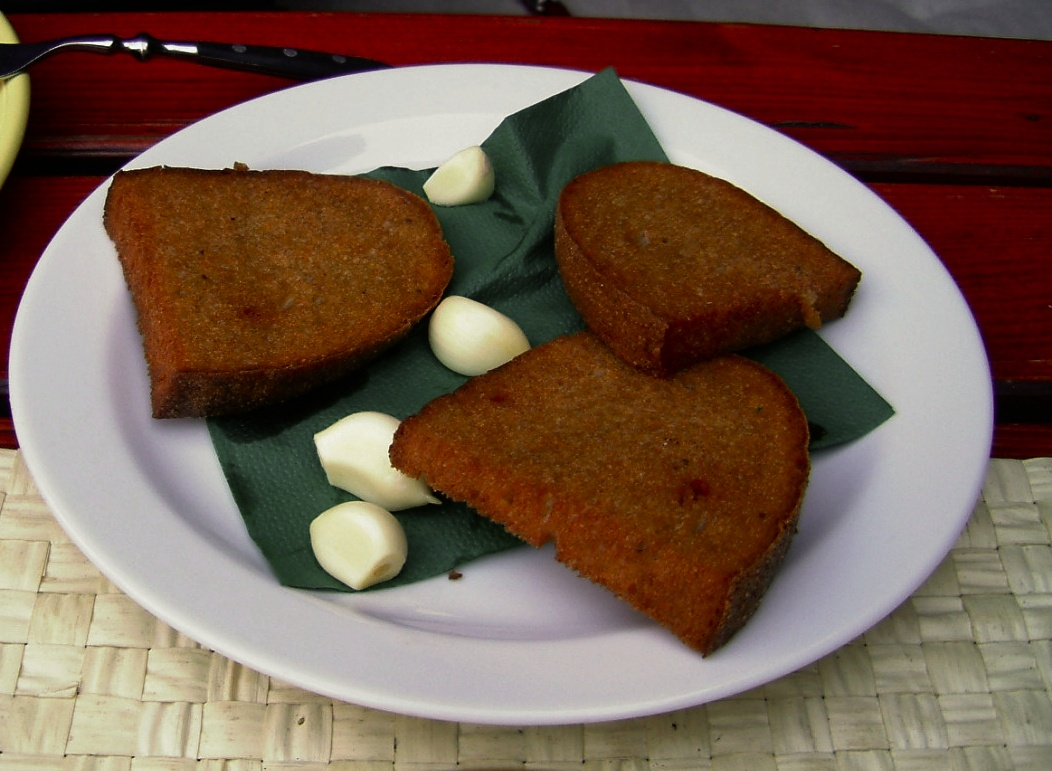
Topinky

=== Great Britain and Ireland ===
A full English, Irish, Scottish, or Welsh breakfast will often include bread fried in oil, butter, lard, or bacon drippings. In Northern Ireland, an Ulster fry may include fried soda farls.

=== Italy ===
Pane fritto is an Italian fried bread dish often used to prevent wasting stale bread; it is commonly dipped in milk before frying.

=== Japan ===
In Japan, Agepan is a koppe-pan that has been deep-fried in cooking oil and flavored with a sweet coating, such as sugar or kinako. It is a dish typically enjoyed by schoolchildren.

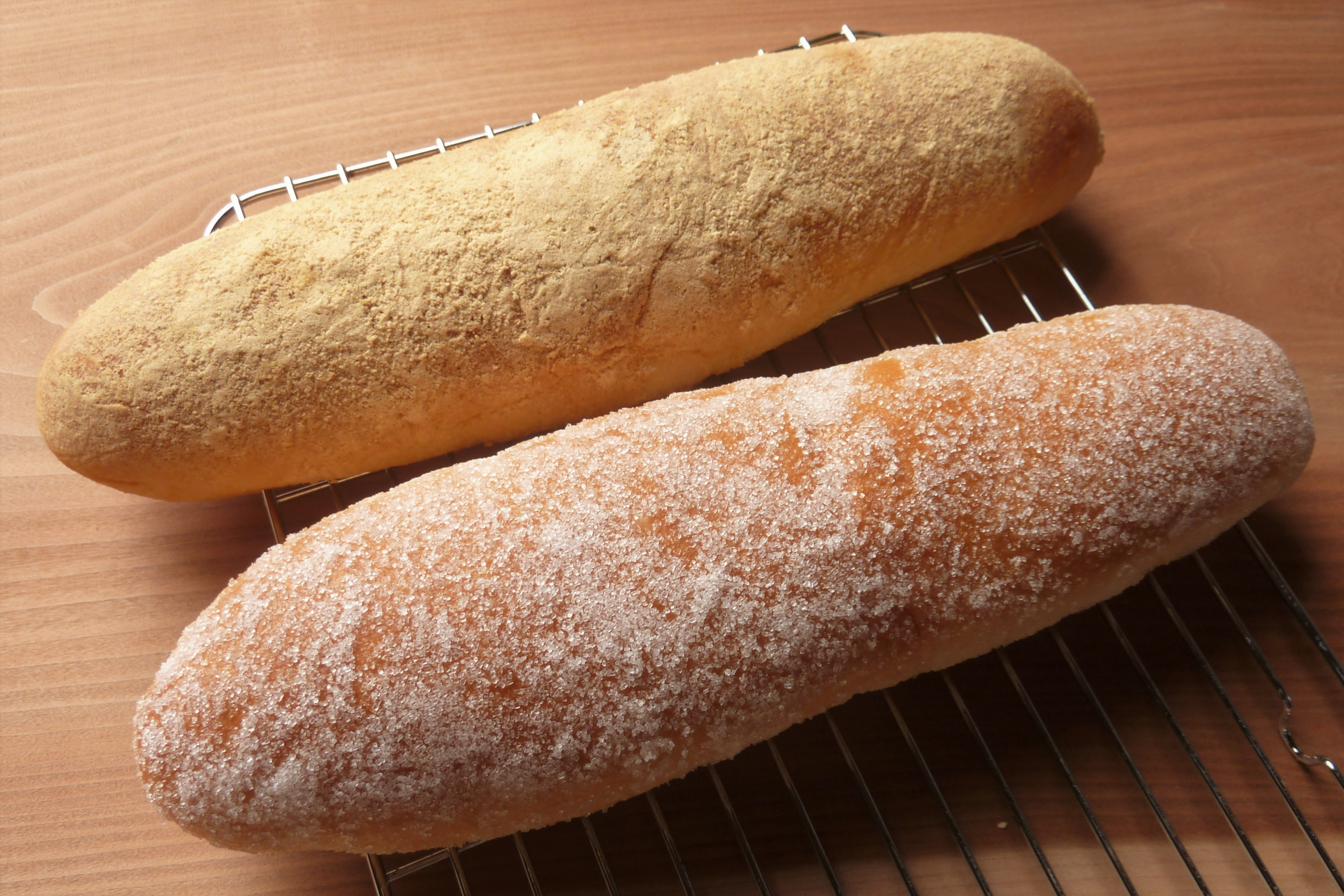
Agepan

=== United States ===
In the United States, toast is much more popular at breakfast. However, fried bread is still eaten, particularly in the form of French toast, but sometimes as simply a slice of bread fried in butter.

== See also ==
- Fried dough
- List of breads
