= Crostini =

Italian appetizer

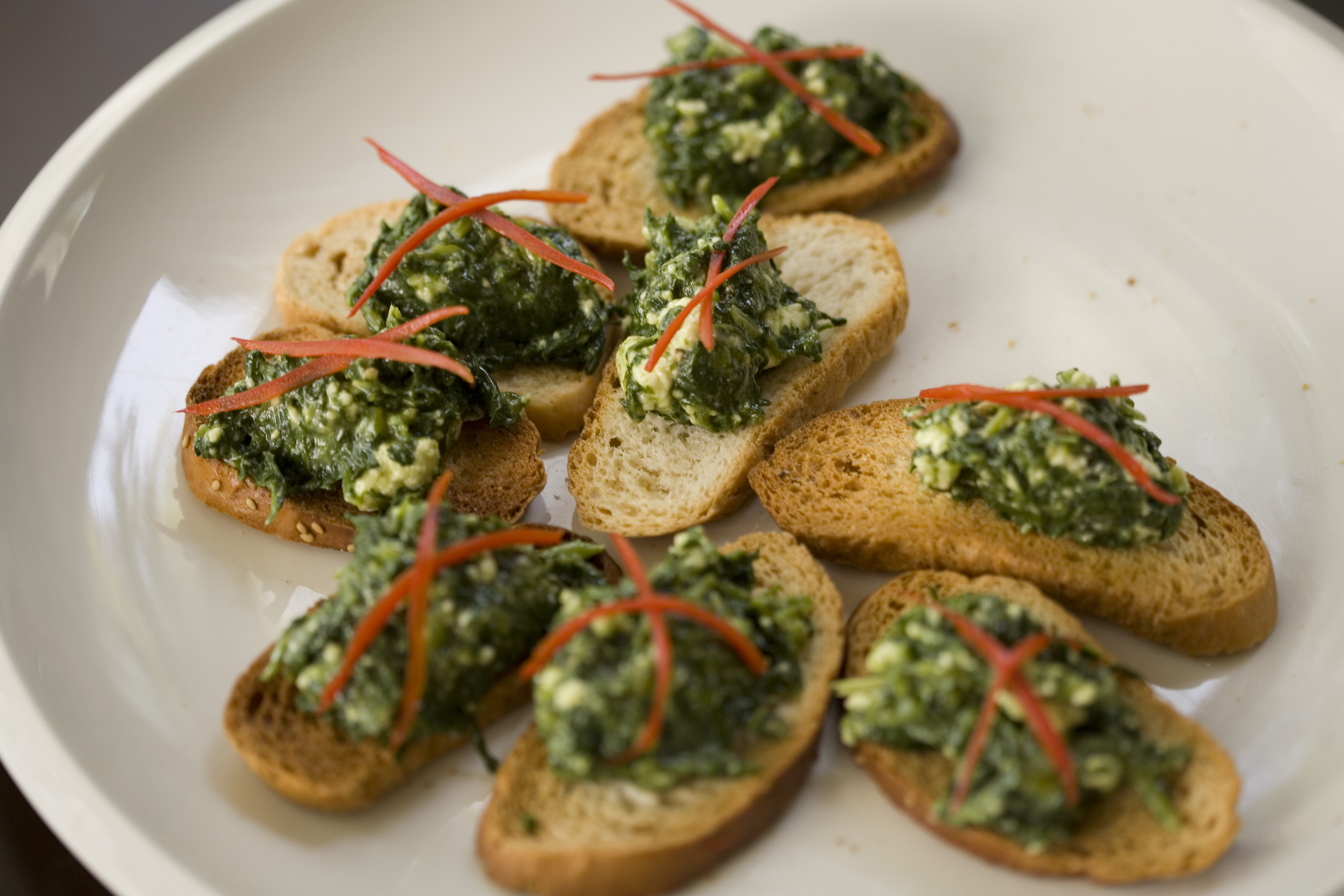
- Cheese and spinach crostini
- Alternative names: Crostino (Italian singular form)
- Course: Antipasto
- Place of origin: Italy
- Main ingredients: Bread, topping

Crostini (lit. 'little crusts'; sg.: crostino) are an Italian appetizer (antipasto) consisting of small slices of grilled or toasted bread and toppings. The toppings may include a variety of different cheeses, meats, vegetables, and condiments, or may be presented more simply with a brush of olive oil and herbs or a sauce.

Along with bruschetta, crostini are thought to have originated in medieval times, when it was typical for peasants to eat their meals on slices of bread instead of using ceramics.

== See also ==
Media related to Crostini at Wikimedia Commons

- List of toast dishes
