= Kopi (drink) =

Southeast Asian coffee drink

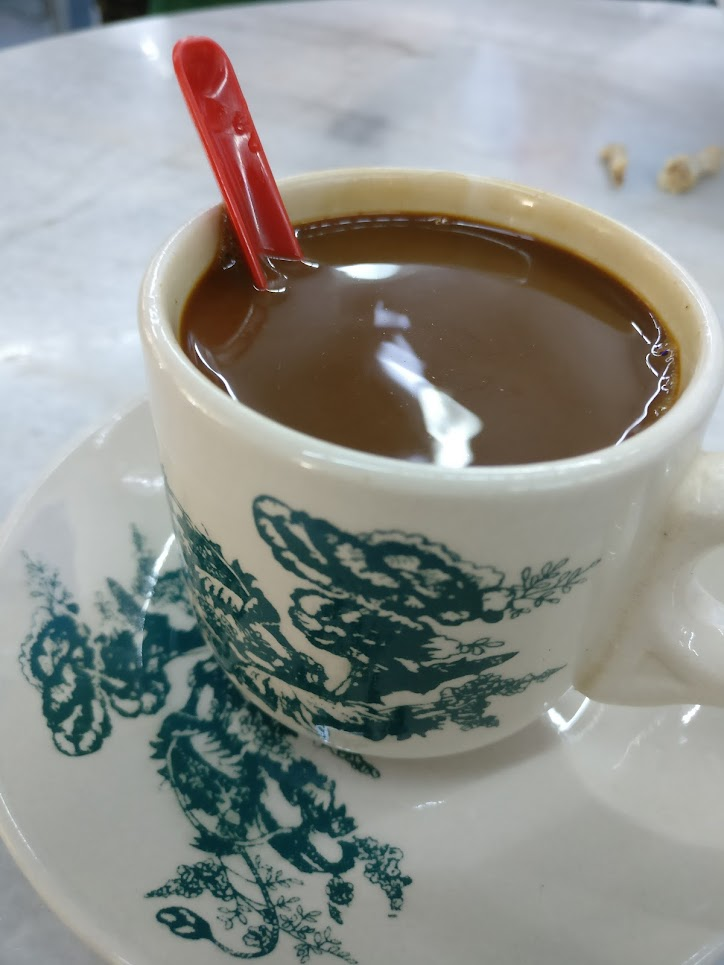
- A cup of kopi
- Type: Served hot or cold
- Origin: British Malaya
- Color: Black or brown

Kopi (Chinese: 㗝呸/咖啡; Pe̍h-ōe-jī: ko-pi), also known as Nanyang coffee, is a traditional coffee beverage found in several Southeast Asian nations. It is often brewed to be highly caffeinated, and it is commonly served with sugar and/or milk-based condiments. The drink originated during the British Malaya era and has Hainanese cultural roots. Its name is derived from the Malay term for coffee. The term Nanyang, which means "south sea" in Mandarin, refers to Southeast Asia. Kopi-culture vocabulary is grounded in the Hokkien language as a result of historical immigration to Southeast Asia from the Minnan region of Fujian Province, in southeastern China. Kopi is usually served in coffee shops, hawker centres, and kopitiams across the region.

In Singapore, kopi is recognized as culturally significant and part of everyday diet and lifestyle. Singapore coffee is distinct from other types due to its roasting process and preparation technique involving a variation of the Torrefacto method. Concerns over the elevation of diabetes cases have caused the creation of government-led nationwide campaigns in Singapore to reduce sugar intake, especially with regard to sweet drinks or drinks that add large amounts of sugar, such as kopi. The significance of kopi in Singapore's culture can be explored in greater detail in the country's kopi museum.

== Etymology and Hokkien roots ==
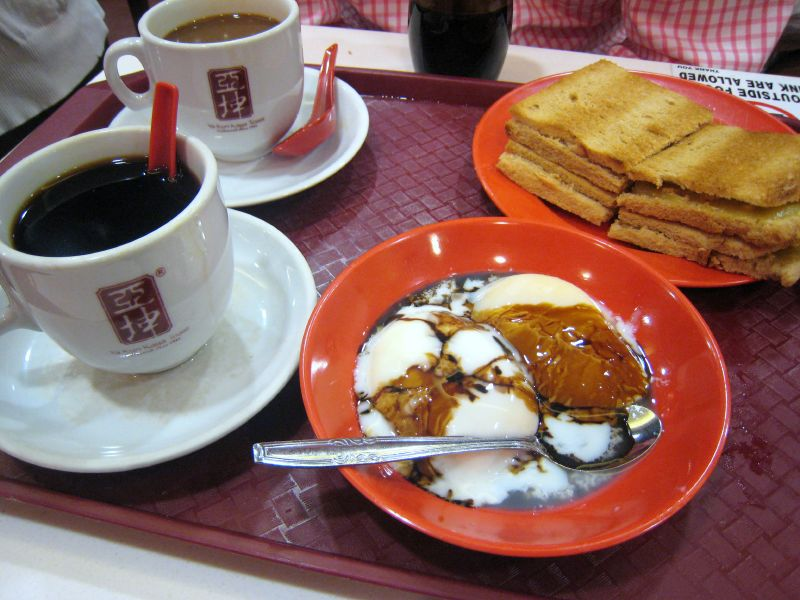
Kopi (background) and kopi O (foreground). Kopi paired with kaya toast and half-boiled egg, is a popular breakfast option in Singapore (widely available in coffee-shops as "Set A").

This prominence of the Hokkien language in local kopi culture can be linked to the prominence of Hokkien immigrants in Malaya and colonial Singapore. According to the history of Chinese immigration, millions of China residents left due to natural calamities and political instability during the 19th century. In the beginning, 50,000 Chinese landed in Singapore—many of them Chinese traders. This number grew to 200,000 in 1900 as more passed through the Malay States and Dutch East Indies into Singapore. Amongst the arrivals, the Hokkiens made up the largest proportion of Chinese dialect groups in Singapore. Thus, they also came to possess a dominant share of the banking, manufacturing and trade industries.

== Variations ==
Variations in style of traditional coffee revolve around denseness, sugar level, and additions of evaporated milk, condensed milk or ice. Local kopi vocabulary governs the way consumers order their preferred style of kopi in Malaysia and Singapore.

Kopi is a term from Malay and is used in conjunction with terms from different Chinese languages, including Hokkien and Cantonese. In Singapore, there are at least 54 core variations of kopi with different customisation on sugar, temperature and thickness. These terms are recognised in hawkers and coffee shops nationally.

The terms used to order these variations in Singapore, along with their respective meanings, can be found below.

Order	Meaning	Etymology
Kopi	Coffee with sugar and condensed milk.	
Kopi O	Black coffee with sugar.	"O" is derived from Hokkien o͘ (烏; 'black').
Kopi O kosong	Black coffee without sugar or any type of milk.	Malay kosong means "empty".
Kopi C	Coffee with sugar and evaporated milk.	Uncertain. The "C" may be derived from the first letter of Carnation—historically, one of the most available brands of evaporated milk used in Singapore. It may also be derived from Hainanese si1 (鮮; 'fresh').
Kopi peng	Iced coffee with sugar and condensed milk. "Peng" means that ice is added, and can be used as a modifier in other orders, e.g. kopi O peng.	"Peng" is derived from Hokkien peng (冰; 'ice')
Kopi siew dai	Coffee with less sugar and condensed milk.	"Siew dai" is possibly derived from Cantonese siu2 dai2 (少底; 'less base').
Kopi siew siew dai	Coffee with little sugar and condensed milk.	
Kopi gah dai	Coffee with extra sugar and condensed milk.	"Ga dai" is possibly derived from Cantonese gaa1 dai2 (加底; 'more base').
Kopi gao	Coffee with sugar, condensed milk and extra thick concentrated coffee.	"Gao" is derived from Hokkien kāu (厚; 'strong', 'thick').
Kopi di lo	Coffee with no dilution.	"Di lo" is derived from Hokkien ti̍t lo̍h (直落; 'straight down (from the jug)').
Kopi poh	Coffee with extra dilution.	"Poh" is derived from Hokkien po̍h (薄; 'weak', 'thin').
Kopi cham or Yuanyang	Coffee mixed with tea.	"Cham" derives from Hokkien chham (參; 'mix').

Younger generations of Singaporeans have created modern twists on kopi, such as almond ginger kopi.

== Processing ==
=== Beans and sources ===
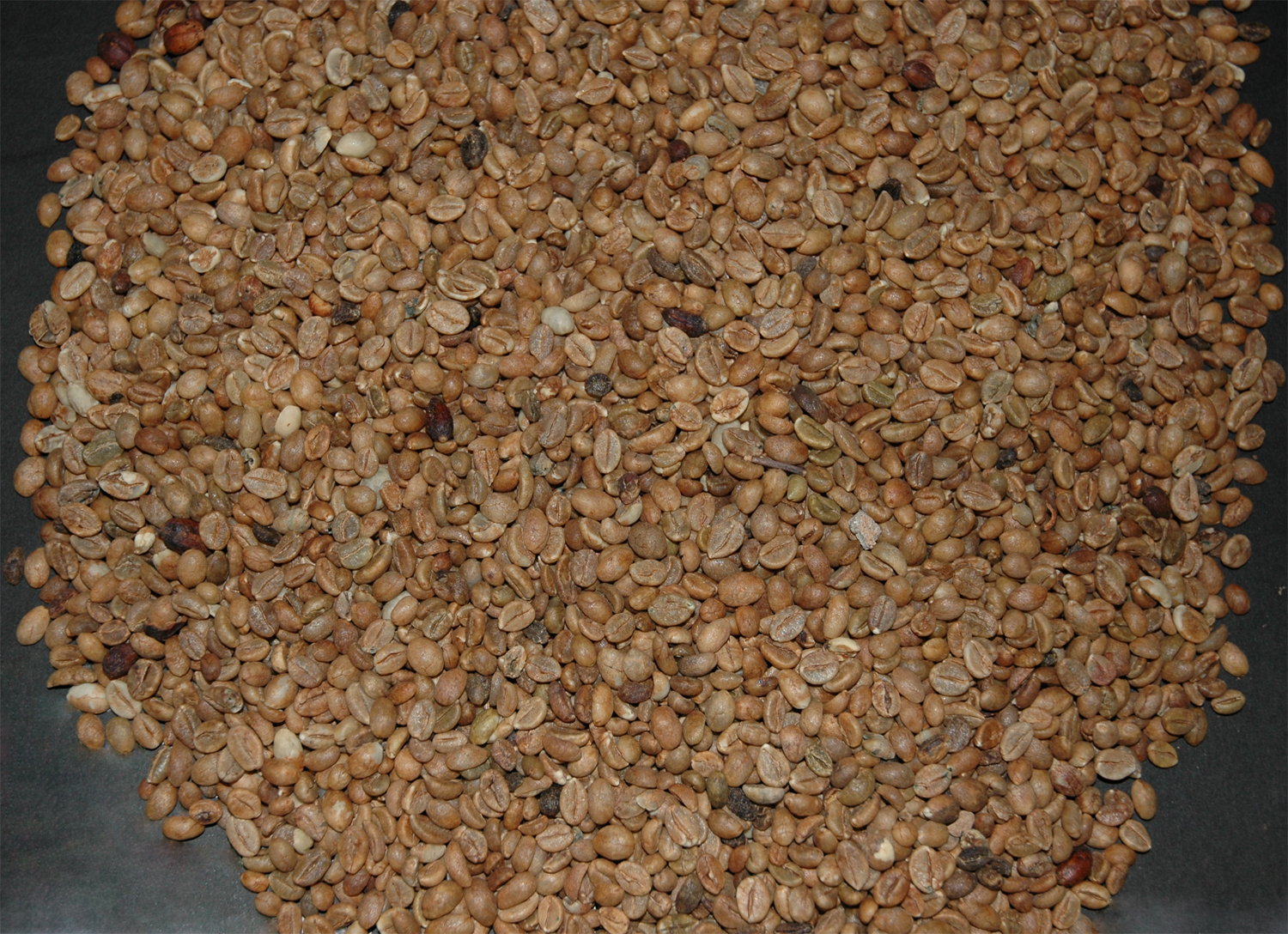
Unroasted robusta beans

Kopi traditionally uses Robusta coffee beans. During colonial Singapore, the Chinese partook in exchanges with Arab traders who carried with them Indonesian Robusta beans, and these beans grew better in Singapore's conditions as opposed to Arabica beans. The common type of Robusta beans used in Singapore is the Indonesia EK-1 species. In 21st-century Singapore, Robusta beans continue to be largely imported from Indonesia and Vietnam. In a bid to modernize, heritage brands such as Lam Yeo Coffee Powder Factory choose to use gourmet beans from South Africa and Central America.

=== Roasting ===
The general traditional preparation process for Hainanese-style kopi involves using a combination of 80% beans, 20% sugar and margarine in the roasting process for a duration of 25 minutes at 180 degrees Celsius. Halfway into the roasting time, salt is added. Sugar is also added at the end to provide a caramelized finish and take away any bitter aftertaste. The result is a richer and more fragrant coffee than Western-style coffee. This method has been said to hold slight similarities to the common Torrefacto roasting method in Argentina, Costa Rica, France, Portugal and Spain.

=== Serving ===
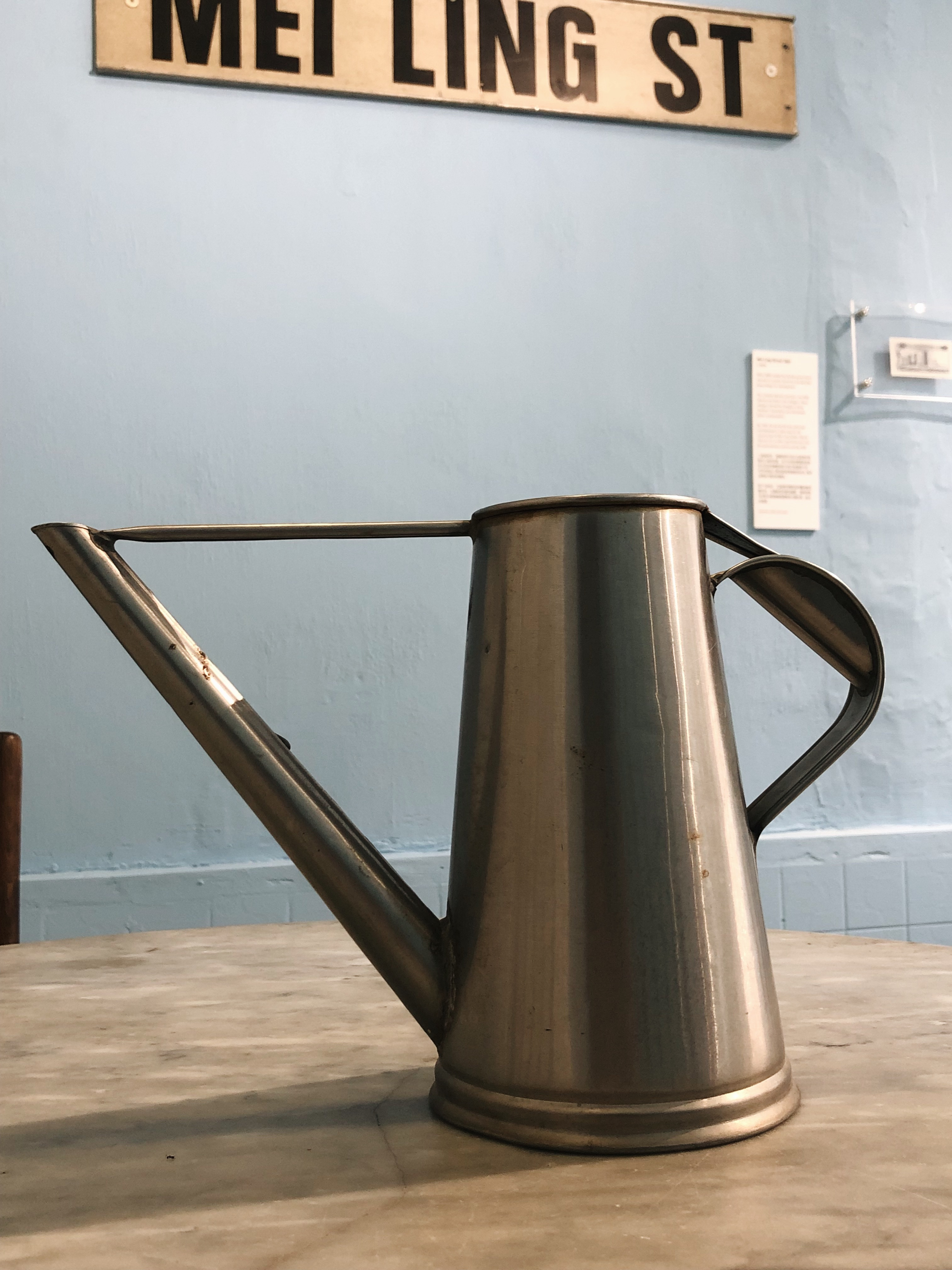
A kopi pot

To serve, the ground kopi powder is placed in a muslin bag and boiling water is poured over it. It is then stirred using a long stick or chopstick. After, the brew is transferred back and forth between two large cylindrical kettles with upright tubular spouts tapering to the pouring end. The purpose is to aerate and cool the kopi.

=== Nutrition ===
Kopi has twice the amount of caffeine found in Arabica coffee. A regular cup of kopi contains four teaspoons of sugar whereas kopi siew dai has 3.5 tsp (25 mL). In Malaysia and Singapore, you can order Kopi o kosong which contains no sugar or milk.

== History ==
=== Malaysia ===
In Malaya before it joined to form Malaysia in 1963, coffee was first locally grown in back in 1779 where Arabica beans were planted. Liberica beans was brought into Malaya by Leonard Wray in 1875 to establish plantations for a Malayan colonial coffee industry.

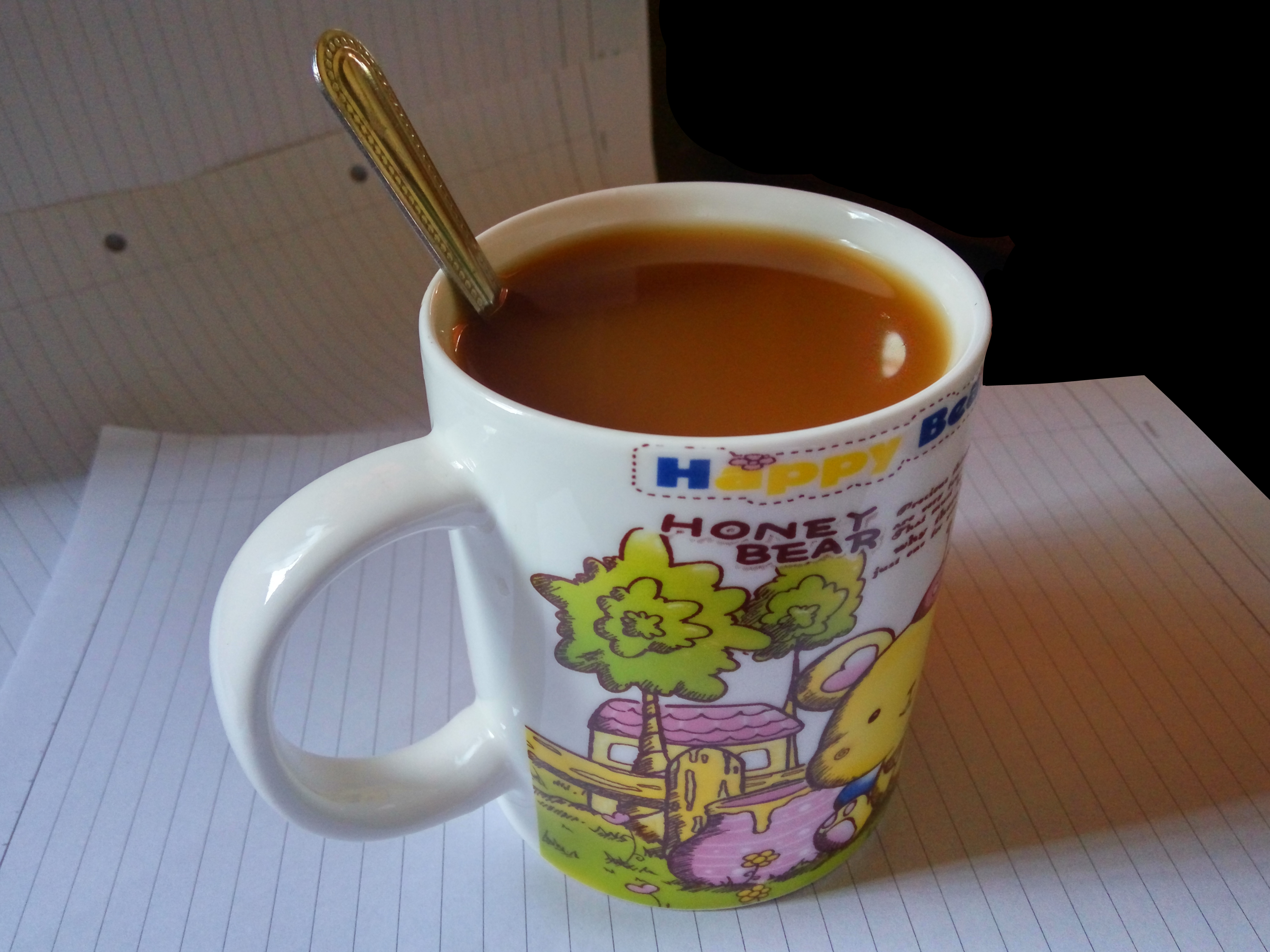
A mug of kopi brewed from Tenom-grown ground coffee beans

In East Malaysia, the town of Tenom in the state of Sabah is a major producer of Robusta variety coffee beans used to make kopi, which is widely consumed throughout the state and the neighbouring kingdom of Brunei. The beans are processed using traditional firewood and drum rotation methods and typically without addition of any artificial ingredients or colourings.

Coffee was first planted at the end of the 17th century Sabah during the administration of British North Borneo, concentrated mainly in the area of the east coast on the forest reserve near mangrove areas with the coffea arabica variety. However, due to a significant drop in the worldwide price for coffee and a severe outbreak of disease, coffee plantations had been largely abandoned by 1910. Since then, coffee production was concentrated in the west coast area. Tenom received attention when the British North Borneo Chartered Company (BNBCC) established coffee and other plantations in the area. To take the resources to major towns, a railway line from Melalap to Jesselton (now Kota Kinabalu) was built by the British in the late 1890s. To increase the coffee production, many labourers from China, mainly those of Hakka and Cantonese descent were brought to Tenom by the British as local workforce. Today, Tenom is widely known as an agriculture site with large coffee production and has been dubbed as the "Sabah's coffee capital". Due to its large demand from other countries since 2010s, the government began to help to address the shortage of raw coffee supply in Tenom.

=== Singapore ===
The origin of kopi in Singapore is intertwined with the demographic, industrial and cultural history of colonial Singapore. In 1821, the Hainanese arrived in Singapore to trade medicinal herbs, umbrellas and wax amongst other things. They did not immigrate to Singapore until much later in the 1870s due to conservative attitudes and delayed open trade and seafaring activities.

This left the Hainanese at an employment disadvantage compared to earlier arrivals like the Hokkien, Teochew and Cantonese, who had already entrenched themselves into industries like commerce and agriculture, due to aid from exclusivist clan associations. The Hainanese were a small group, unable to communicate easily with other Chinese groups due to language barriers and were both illiterate and poor. These circumstances forced them into the service sector, where they found work as rubber tapers, waiters, and more popularly, cooks and domestic servants in rich European and Peranakan households.

From the late 1920s to early 1930s, the economic downturn incentivized the Hainanese to turn to the hotel, bar and restaurant landscape due to lower rental rates. The competition from Cantonese single women immigrants and reduction of British and Peranakan families after World War II also impacted the viability of remaining in the services sector. Thus, the Hainanese relied upon their culminated culinary and personal service skills, and increasingly ventured into setting up their own coffeeshops or kopitiams from the 1920s to 1950s. The support from the Hainanese association members aided this successful transition. It is recognized that the Hainanese community played a pioneering and pivotal role in the emergence of the kopitiam culture in Singapore. It was through these Hainanese kopitiams that distinctive techniques of roasting coffee beans and brewing coffee were created, and kopi along with its variations in Singapore was birthed.

During the Japanese Occupation, black market traders often used coffee shops to sell rice, salt and sugar to the public. By mid-1944, tighter restrictions and increased scarcity forced most coffee shops to close. The remaining only offered kopi without sugar and milk. This meant consumption and availability of kopi O greatly reduced. Key events also shaped the kopi landscape in late 1900s Singapore, affecting the price, availability and consumption.

The rapid trend of buying kopitiams in Singapore began in 1988. A direct effect of a change in policy, that enabled privatization of ownership of kopitiams previously under the Housing Development Board. Kopitiams became attractive property investments. This caused the prices of kopitiam properties for sale and resale to rise sharply. The result also encompassed the practice of selling new purchases to another owner, who would then renovate the place to justify increased rents onto the tenants. Another pattern of holding the kopitiam for short periods of time and selling them off to make money quickly also emerged.

The overarching economic result directly impacting stallholders and consumers, was an exponential growth in food and rent prices. Examples included increases of rent by S$1000, a 30% to 70% hike in prices of dishes, and a close to 100% increase in price for a cup of Kopi. In 2006, the price of a kopi O rose from 60 cents to 70 cents. Similarly, in 2016, due to increased rent and labor costs, kopi prices rose to $1.30, which caused unhappiness in patrons.

The reactions of the public towards raised kopi prices – writing complaint letters to The Straits Times and involving The Consumers Association of Singapore – serve as evidence with regard to the constant of kopi in Singapore's food culture and the integral role it plays in the everyday lifestyles of Singapore residents.

=== Thailand ===
Kopi, or koopi, is a popular drink in Southern Thailand. Farmers from certain plantations in the region would process locally grown coffee and brew it in the style of Malaysian kopi culture.

== Sale and distribution ==
=== Consumer market ===
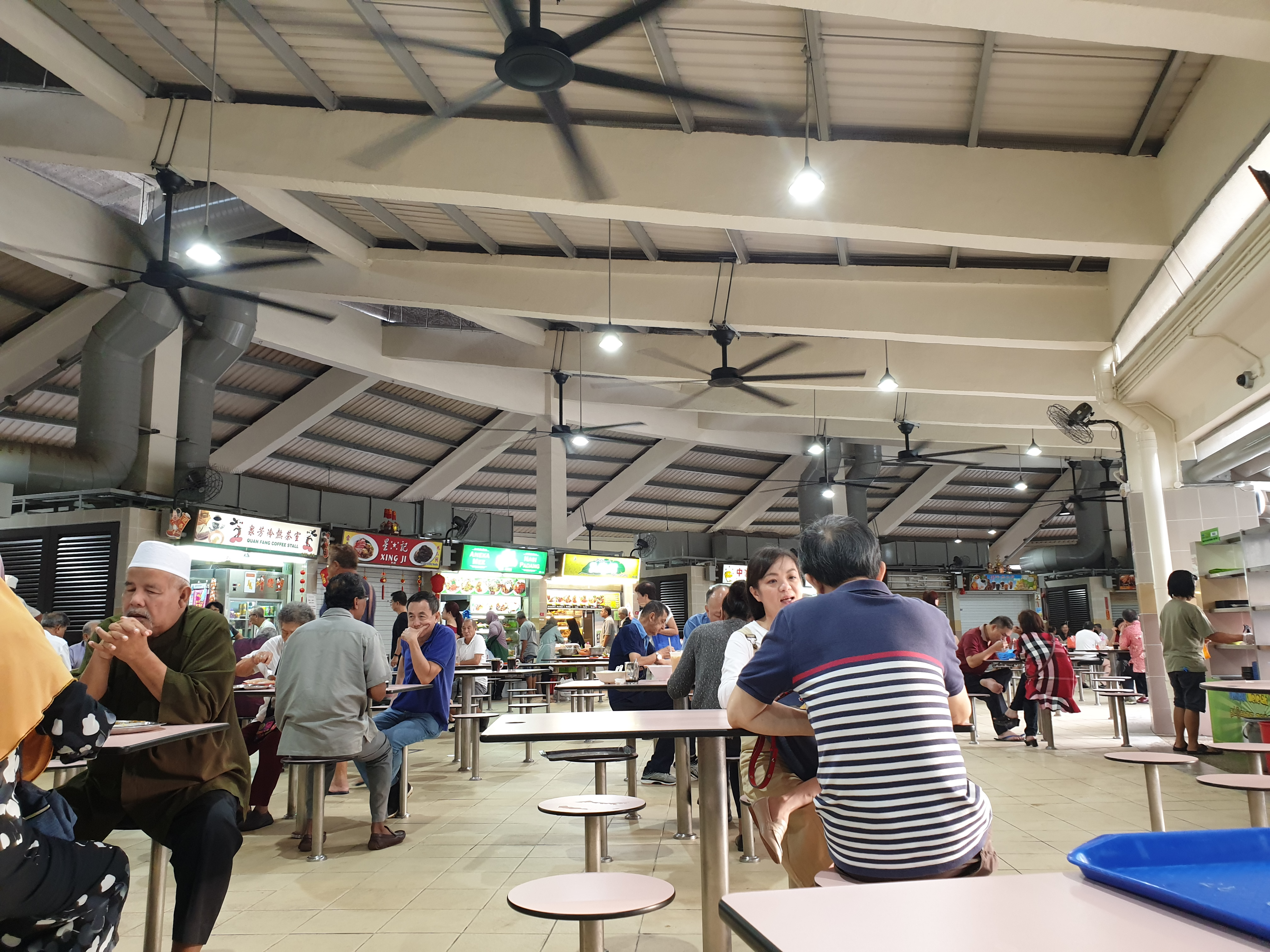
Hawker centre in Singapore

In Singapore there are an estimated 322 coffee shops and hundreds of them are found in the HDB estates. This is alongside hundreds of food courts and hawker centres. Almost all of them sell Singapore kopi and its many variations. The established coffee shops include Tong Ah Eating House in Chinatown that has been passed down through four generations, Killiney kopitiam that has received a heritage award, Heap Seng Leong – one of the few traditional coffee shops serving kopi with butter, and Ah Seng Coffee that began in the 1960s.

There are also commercialized outlets that specialize in the Singapore traditional breakfast and kopi. The household names include:

- Ya Kun, a Hainanese business that began in 1944. The chain is largely seen as culturally significant to Singaporean life and is also recognized for its kaya toast.
- Toast Box, that integrates heritage items into its décor and is known for their butter mountain display. It also conducts Nanyang coffee appreciation workshops.
- and Nanyang Old Coffee, conceptualised in the 1940s and winner of 'The Search for The Best Coffee Competition 2013'. The brand also runs workshops.

An initiative by NTUC Foodfare and Kopitiam that began in 2019, continues to provide kopi at discounted prices of $0.50 for Singaporeans part of the Pioneer and Merdeka generations, and the NTUC Union. A regular cup of kopi usually costs around $0.90 to $1.60 at Kopitiam outlets.

=== Instant kopi ===
The instant coffee market in Singapore is set to grow annually by 3.1% according to Statista. In 2016 and 2017, the movement against diabetes negatively impacted sales numbers. This occurred alongside the growing appeal of coffee pods to consumers in Singapore. One of the major contributing factors towards this trend is the ability to control the amount of sugar and creamer used.

National brands such as Toast Box produce their own instant kopi products. Instant kopi can also be found in local supermarkets. The brands which provide traditional kopi variations such as kopi O include Old Town, OWL, Gold Kili, Aik Cheong and Ah Huat.

== Society and culture ==
=== Consumption (colonial Singapore) ===
During the early 1900s, porcelain cups were typically used to serve the kopi. These cups were decorated by the motifs or logos of the coffee suppliers. Consumers would cool their kopi by pouring it into the saucer and then drinking from it. In the 1930s, some coffee roasters would use opium-infused water to roast their beans in order to make customers addicted to their brew. There was also a practice of warming cold coffee in ceramic cups on a charcoal burner, to give the impression that the coffee was freshly made. Blue-collared workers began to drink coffee instead of tea due to its stronger caffeine effect.

More than 80% of the coffee-shops were run by Hainanese and Foochows, but they were often patronized by members of other communities such as Malays and Indians. The main consumers of kopi at these coffee-shops were men. This was partly due to the small population of women immigrants, and the cultural expectation for them to remain at home or in their quarters.

Another reason was the nature of kopitiams in colonial Singapore, which served as recreation venues for men, gambling dens, and meeting places for secret society members. The prevalence of prostitutes and escort girls at the kopitiams also discouraged women from sitting around.

=== Consumption (modern Singapore) ===
Kopi makes up over 70% of the coffee consumed in 21st-century Singapore. People from all income brackets, gender, age and communities can be found drinking the widely available kopi – with some enjoying four to six cups a day. The original ceramic cups have been widely replaced by glass at many coffee shops. In hawker centres, the takeaway option is served in a plastic bag.

This beverage is often paired with a traditional Singapore breakfast which consists of kaya and butter on charcoal-grilled toast, paired with two soft-boiled eggs. Kaya is an egg jam combined with coconut milk and sugar. The Hainanese version is brown in color due to the use of caramelized sugar. The Peranakan version is instead green in color due to the infusion of pandan leaves. Both types are equally prevalent in Singapore. The breakfast holds links to the British style of breakfast and was popularized by the Hainanese.

=== Health ===
In 2016, Singapore launched a nationwide campaign to tackle diabetes. A survey conducted by YouGov found that 42% of Singaporeans were supportive of a sugar tax in Singapore whereas 58% would favor a ban of drinks containing high sugar levels. The attitudes of Singaporeans towards sugar has a direct impact on their preference of kopi, since kopi O involves addition of sugar. The 2018 healthier drinks policy has created mandatory guidelines for many food and beverage outlets, putting a control on the sugar content. Coffee shop operator Kopitiam has also started the practice of serving sugar-free beverages, and leaving the sugar at the side of stalls for customers to add for themselves. A trial conducted at the Health Promotion Board's public canteen saw a 75% drop in the amount of sugar used, when the self-help practice was implemented. With 430,000 Singaporeans with diabetes in 2018, the dwindling appeal of kopi O shows potential of being a long-term constant.

=== Events and competitions ===
Singapore coffee-related events:

- The Singapore Coffee Festival
  - Organized by The Straits Times and supported by DBS Bank.
  - Held on 4 to 6 August
  - Consists of merchants ranging from cafes to retail shops and workshops.
- Singapore Coffee Auction
  - Organized by the Singapore Coffee Association (SCA) for farmers to promote their coffee beans to the regional and Singapore market.
- Specialty Coffee and Tea Asia
  - Organized by Montgomery Asia Pte Ltd
  - A convention for all supply chain participants in the coffee and tea industry to congregate, showcase and network

Singapore coffee-related competitions:

- Singapore National Barista Championship
- Singapore National Brewers Cup
- Singapore National Latte Art Championship
- Singapore Cup Tasters Championship
- Singapore Coffee in Good Spirits Championship (discontinued)

== Museums ==
The Nanyang Old Coffee Mini Singapore Coffee Museum is a museum dedicated to kopi history. It traces the traditional roasting methods and features photographs, vintage items, and information regarding the kopi landscape in Singapore, as well as those who partake in creating it. An example of an interesting tidbit of information is how empty condensed milk cans were reused as takeaway containers.

== See also ==
- Ipoh white coffee
- List of coffee drinks
