= Roti bakar =

Toast in Malaysian and Indonesian styles

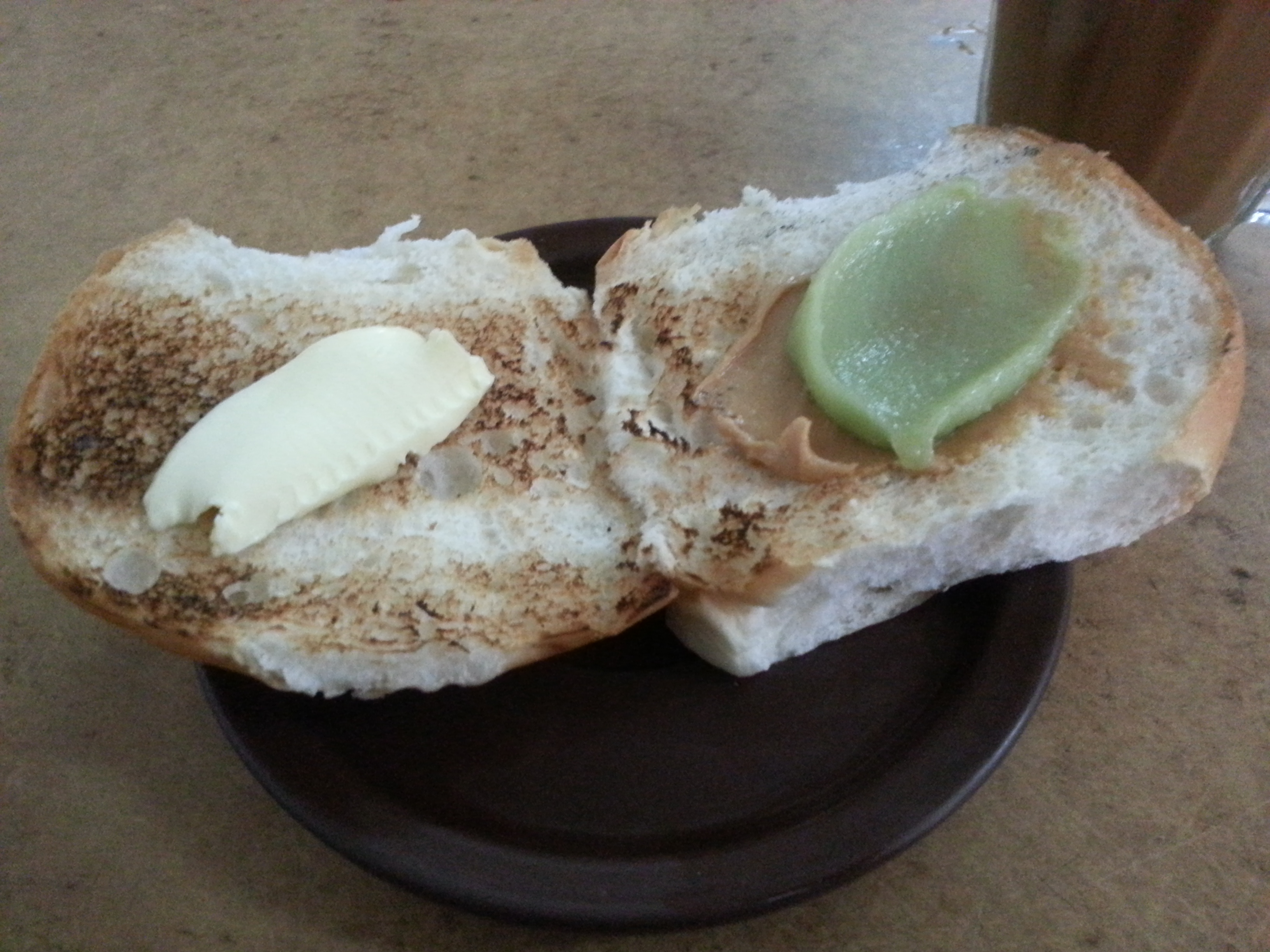
- Roti bakar: butter on the left, peanut butter and kaya on the right
- Alternative names: Roti kahwin
- Type: Toast
- Region or state: Maritime Southeast Asia
- Associated cuisine: Brunei, Indonesia, Malaysia and Singapore
- Invented: 19th century

Toast is a popular breakfast food as well as tea time snack in countries like Brunei, Indonesia, Malaysia and Singapore known as roti bakar or roti kahwin. It uses white bread (roti) grilled or toasted over charcoal, though this practice has dwindled with the advent of sandwich presses.

Common spreads for roti bakar include sugar, butter or the more affordable margarine, cheese, peanut butter, chocolate spread and kaya.

== History ==
In Malaya on the British colonised side of the East Indies or the "Malay Archipelago", Western-style bread first became popular to the local market in the form of roti benggali sold by the British Malaya Bakery in George Town, Penang jointly ventured by one S. Mohamed Ismail from Madras in 1928 (named from Tamil: பங்காளி, romanized: paṅkāḷi "shareholder").

For the Dutch colonised side of the islands, toast became a practical way to consume day-old bread; it was typically served with butter, condensed milk, or Dutch cheeses. After Indonesian independence, roti bakar became ubiquitous throughout Indonesia, as consumption of toast became a matter of taste rather than frugality.

== Variants ==
=== Indonesia ===
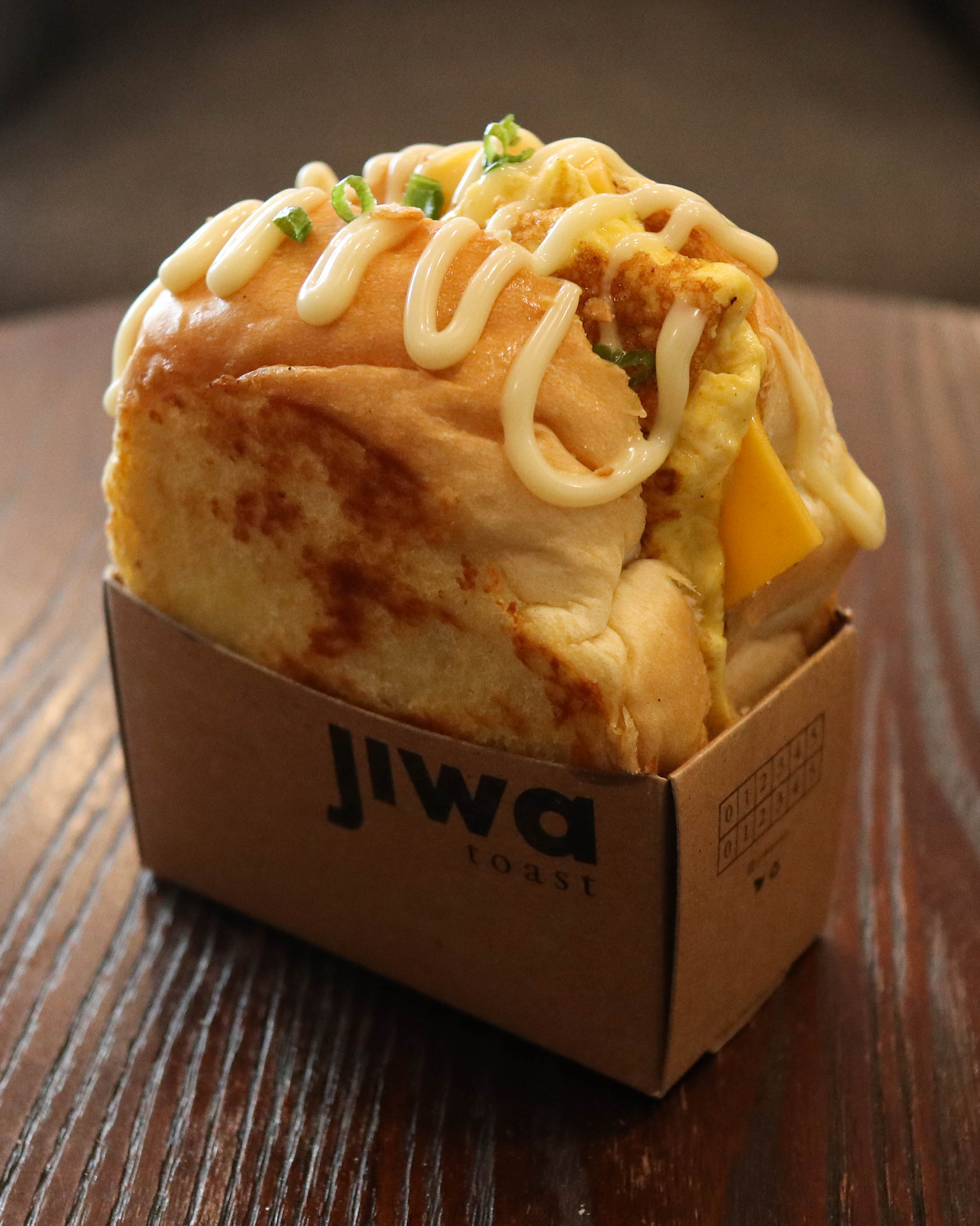
Modern variant of Indonesian roti bakar

In Indonesia, roti bakar is usually prepared as a sandwich of grilled white bread with a filling, consumed both as a light breakfast and a common street food or a menu item in coffeeshops.

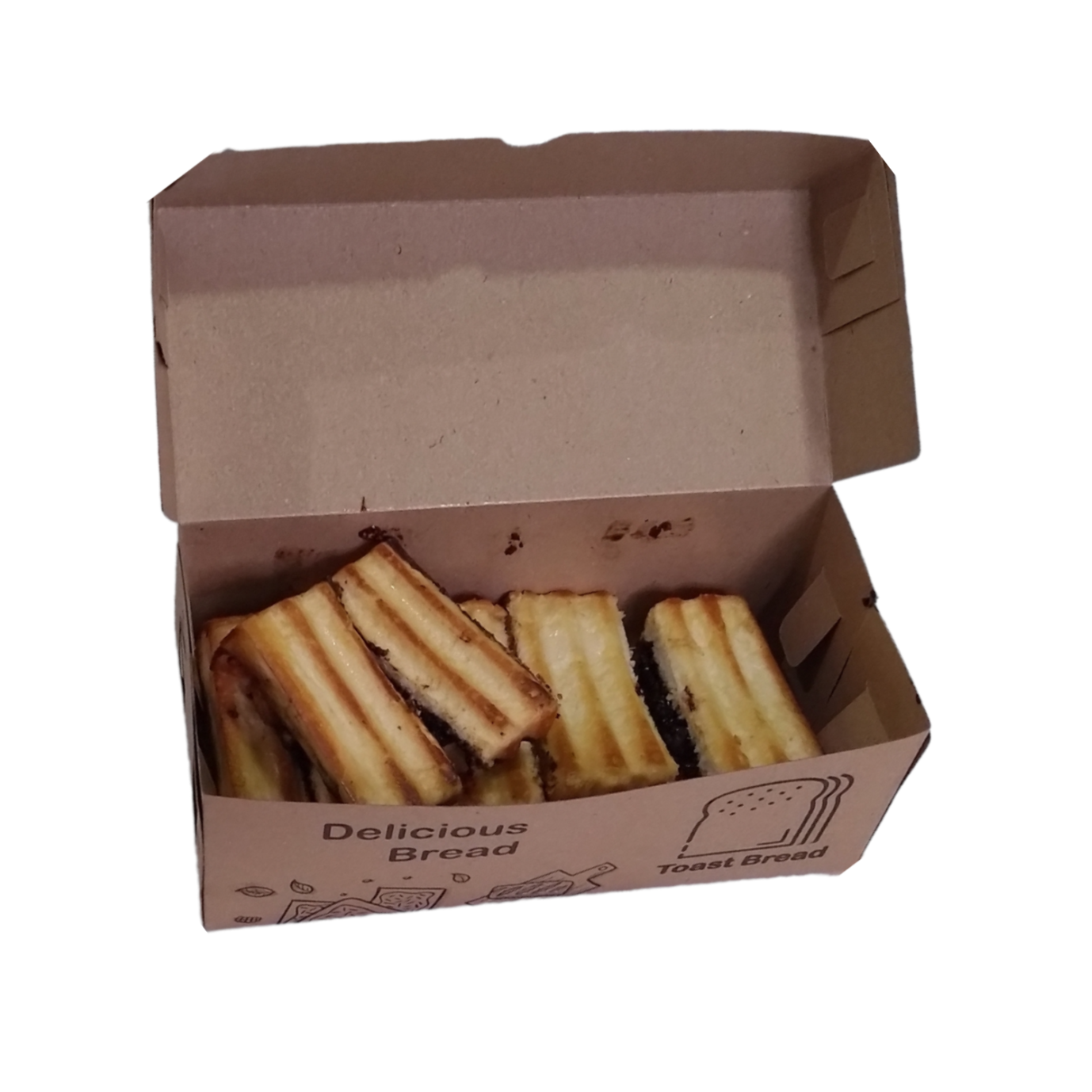
Chocolate flavored roti bakar

Many flavors have been developed for modern tastes, such as meses, crushed Oreo biscuits, or chocolate syrup, savory variants imitating western-styled sandwiches also exist.

=== Malaysia and Singapore ===
In Malaysia, coconut jam and cold butter are a popular combination to spread on roti bakar. This may be the inspiration for the Singaporean kaya toast which was created by Hainanese immigrants.

The city of Ipoh in Perak is known for its kopitiam establishments, where roti bakar accompanied with local tea or coffee beverages and a serving of half boiled eggs is a staple order during morning or afternoon tea.

A variation on roti bakar is roti titab, a thick warm toast with kaya spread onto all four corners and topped with a half-boiled egg.

== See also ==
- Kaya toast – Malaysian and Singaporean toast
