= Kopitiam (disambiguation) =

Kopitiam or kopi tiam is a Southeast Asian term for coffee shop.

It may also refer to:

- Kopitiam (TV series), 1998–2003 Malaysian comedy series
- Kopitiam (company), Singaporean company
