= Srikaya =

Srikaya or serikaya can refer to:

- Sugar-apple, a tropical fruit from the genus Annona
- Kaya (jam), a food spread from Southeast Asia
