= Kaya toast =

Toast with coconut jam

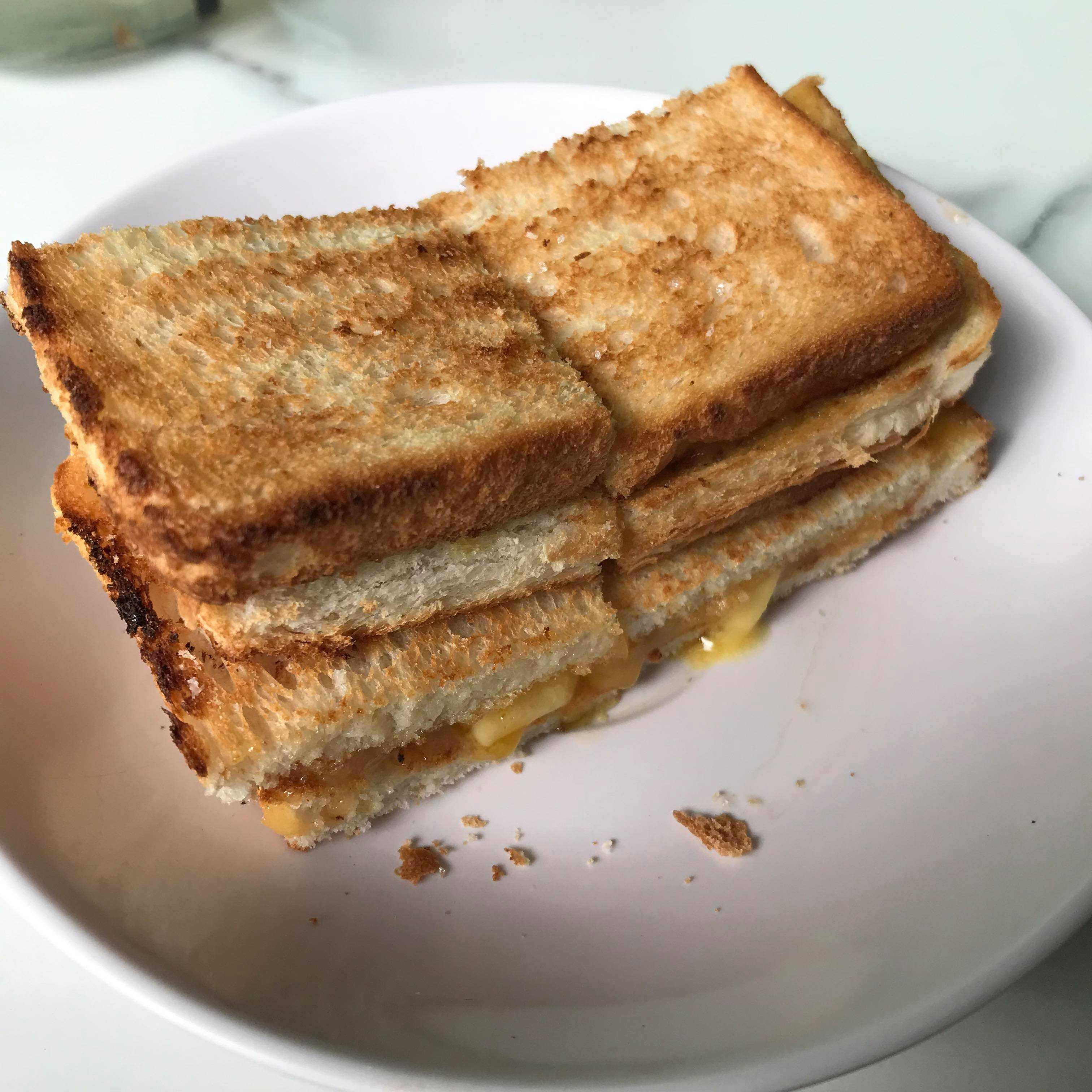
- Kaya toast in Singapore
- Type: Toast
- Course: Breakfast
- Place of origin: Malaysia, Singapore, Straits Settlements
- Region or state: Malacca, Penang and Singapore (former Straits Settlements)
- Created by: Hainanese cooks during the Straits Settlements period
- Serving temperature: Hot
- Main ingredients: Kaya (coconut jam)
- Glycemic index: 49 (low)
- Similar dishes: Roti bakar

Kaya toast is a dish consisting of two slices of toast with butter and kaya (coconut jam), commonly served alongside kopi and soft-boiled eggs. The dish was believed to be created by Hainanese immigrants to the Straits Settlements in the 19th century while serving on British ships at the Port of Singapore.

The dish is commonly consumed for breakfast or as a late afternoon snack. It became integrated into coffeeshop culture, being widely available in eating establishments such as kopi tiams, hawker centres, food courts and Singaporean café chains such as Ya Kun Kaya Toast, Killiney Kopitiam and Breadtalk's Toast Box.

== History ==
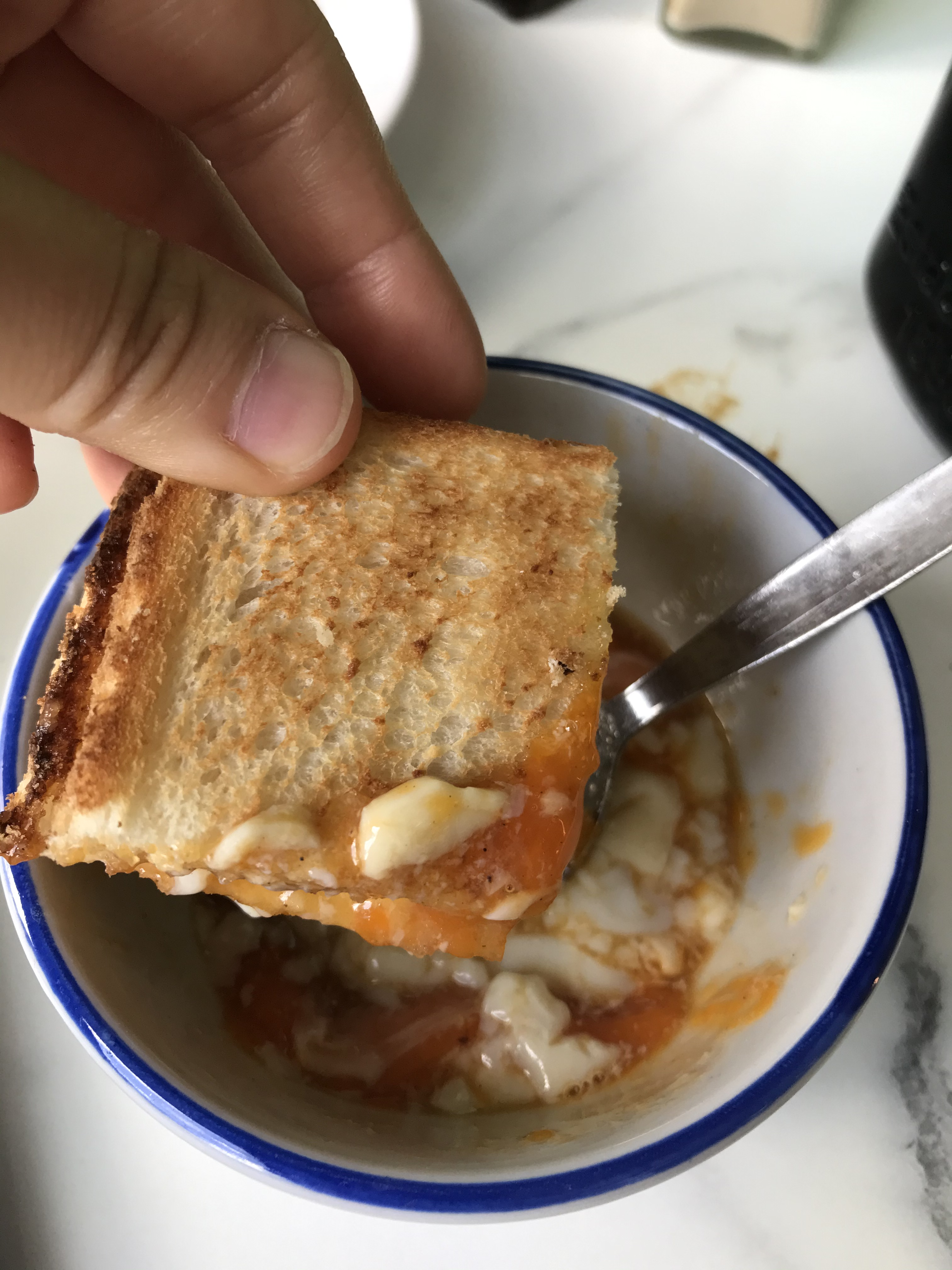
Kaya toast dipped into soft-boiled egg

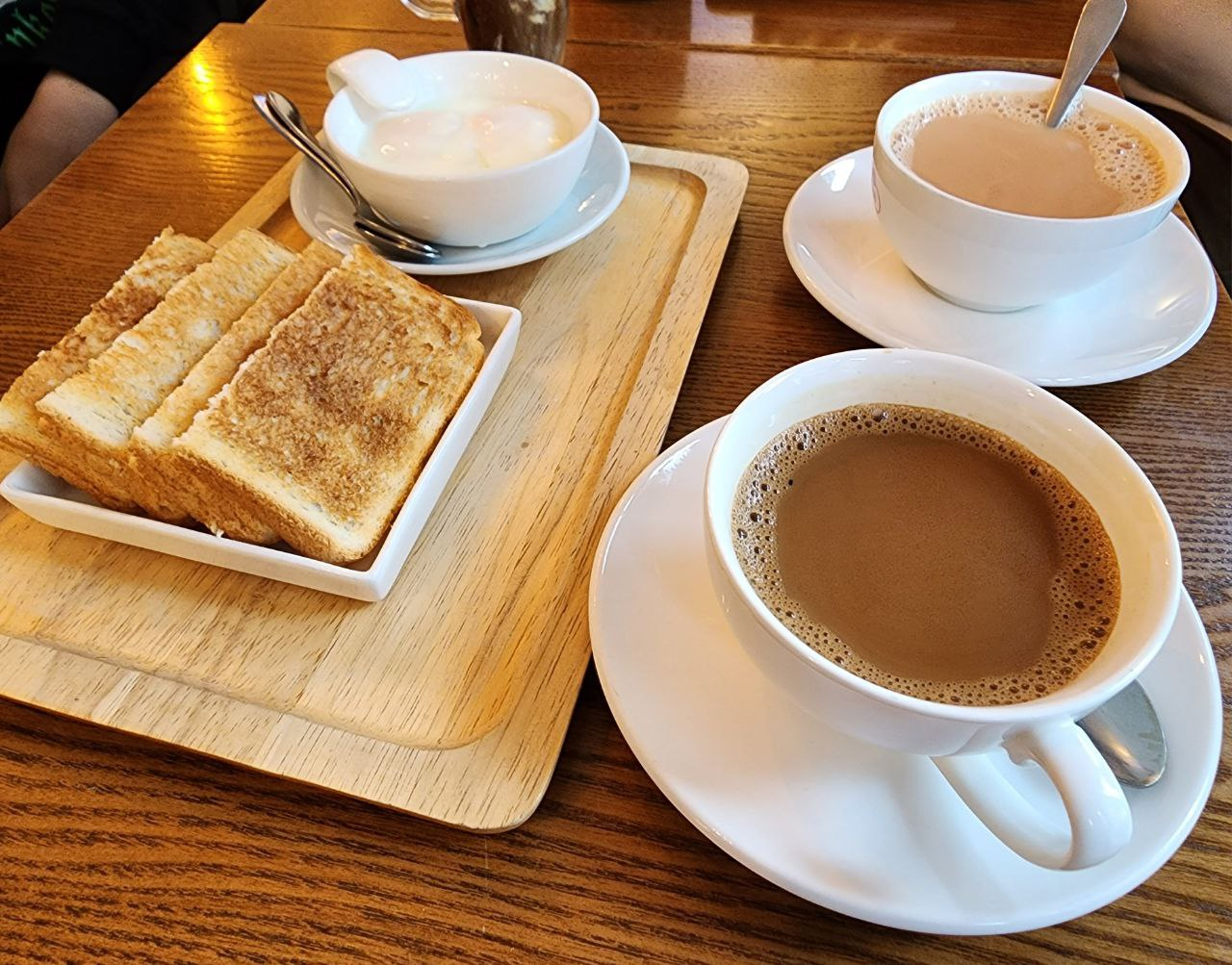
Kaya toast with kopi and teh tarik served in a Singaporean cafe in Seoul, South Korea

It is believed that Hainanese immigrants created the kaya toast by adapting what they had previously prepared while serving on British ships docked at ports during the Straits Settlements period. The kaya spread was considered a replacement for Western fruit jams. The Hainanese eventually settled in Singapore and opened kopitiams (coffee shops). Established in 1919 as Kheng Hoe Heng Coffeeshop, Killiney Kopitiam is one of the oldest coffee shops in Singapore specialising in the dish. Kopitiams started becoming a common sight in Singapore after the Japanese occupation around 1945, when rental for commercial spaces were affordable. Mostly set up by the Hainanese, these kopitiams specialised in selling coffee, tea, and cakes, as well as making their own kaya.

In the past, traditional snack shops could only be found in a few locations such as Chinatown and Balestier Road. However, Singapore started actively promoting its street food or hawker fare via the Singapore Tourism Board (STB). In 1994, it held a month-long event to promote traditional foods called the Singapore Food Festival, which has been hosted annually since then. In 2004, Kaya toast was featured by the Singapore Tourism Board in its "Uniquely Singapore Shop & Eat Tours" as a Singaporean representative local snack.

Government efforts to relocate street-side coffee carts into hawker centres also significantly contributed to growth of the kaya toast business. Since then, kaya toast has become a widely available item in cafés and hawker centres across Singapore.

== Preparation ==
The preparation method and appearance of kaya toast has changed. Sellers use electric grills instead of the traditional charcoal grills. Previously, hawker workers would use homemade bread but have now opted to order bread supplies from factories. While the methods and ingredients have been simplified, one thing that has yet to change drastically is the kaya spread itself. The kaya spreads used in renowned retailers, such as Ya Kun Kaya Toast and Killiney Kopitiam, are still produced from traditional recipes. It is also worth noting that changes in the method, menu, and economy have not necessarily led to a decline in traditional food sellers. Singapore itself does not prevent the rise of micro-entrepreneurs in the department of traditional food.

=== Variations ===
One slice of kaya toast is usually accompanied by another with butter, to make a sandwich, alongside coffee and two runny soft-boiled eggs, paired with dark soy sauce and white pepper.

In Malaysia, roti bakar or toast which is prepared with butter and kaya, is sometimes referred to as "kaya toast" in English.

== Nutrition ==
Macronutrient Composition
Food	Carbohydrate (g/100g)	Fat (g/portion)	Protein (g/portion)	Total energy (kJ/portion)
Kaya toast	46.0	17.6	7.3	1,623

One portion of kaya toast (108.7 gram) is categorized as a low Glycemic Index (GI) food with an average score of 49 on the scale.

== Cultural impact ==
Kaya toast is generally associated with the Singaporean cuisine, due to the active promotion of the dish by the Singapore Tourism Board.

In October 2021, the Monetary Authority of Singapore (MAS) unveiled commemorative coins that features kaya toast as well as other local dishes, as part of its commemoration over the inscription of hawker culture into the UNESCO Intangible Cultural Heritage Lists that previous year.

In March 2024, kaya toast was listed as Singaporean at number 42 in the '100 Best Rated Breads in the World', by TasteAtlas.

== See also ==
- Roti bakar
- Ogura toast
