= Ogura toast =

Japanese breakfast dish

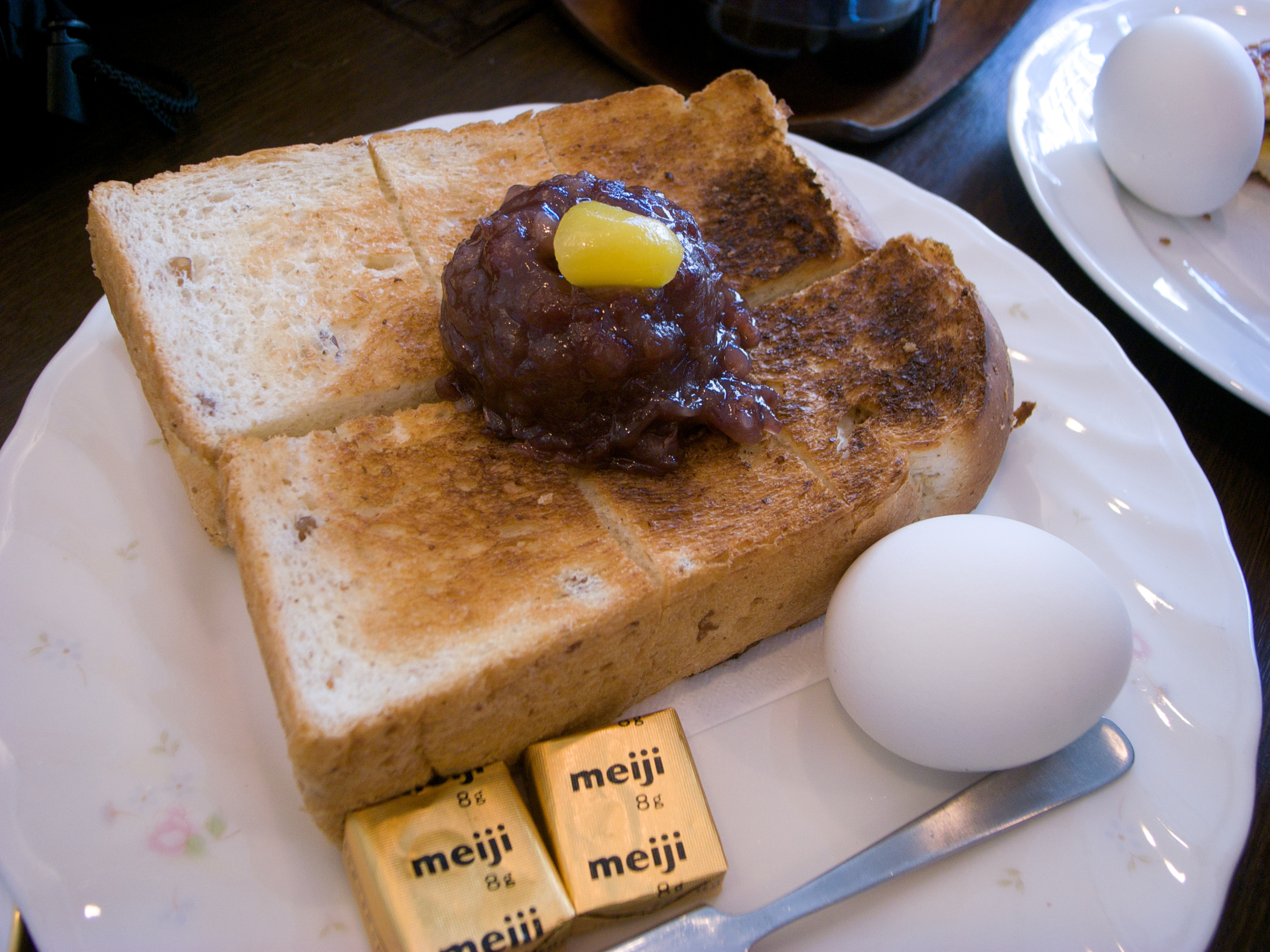
- Ogura toast with butter and a boiled egg
- Alternative names: An toast (あんトースト)
- Type: Toast
- Course: Breakfast
- Place of origin: Japan
- Region or state: Aichi Prefecture
- Created by: Mitsuba (満つ葉) Cafe, Sakae, Nagoya-shi
- Main ingredients: Ogura (adzuki beans), sliced bread
- Similar dishes: Anpan, kaya toast

Ogura toast (小倉トースト, ogura tōsuto) is a dish of thickly sliced toasted bread topped with ogura, a sweet jam made from adzuki beans. It is often served in cafés in Nagoya, Japan.

== Origin ==
Ogura toast originated at the Mitsuba cafe in the Sakae area of Nagoya in 1921 (Taishō 10). A shopkeeper at Mitsuba noticed customers dipping their toast in zenzai (ogura porridge), and was inspired to create ogura toast. The dish spread across Aichi to become a café staple.

== Gallery ==
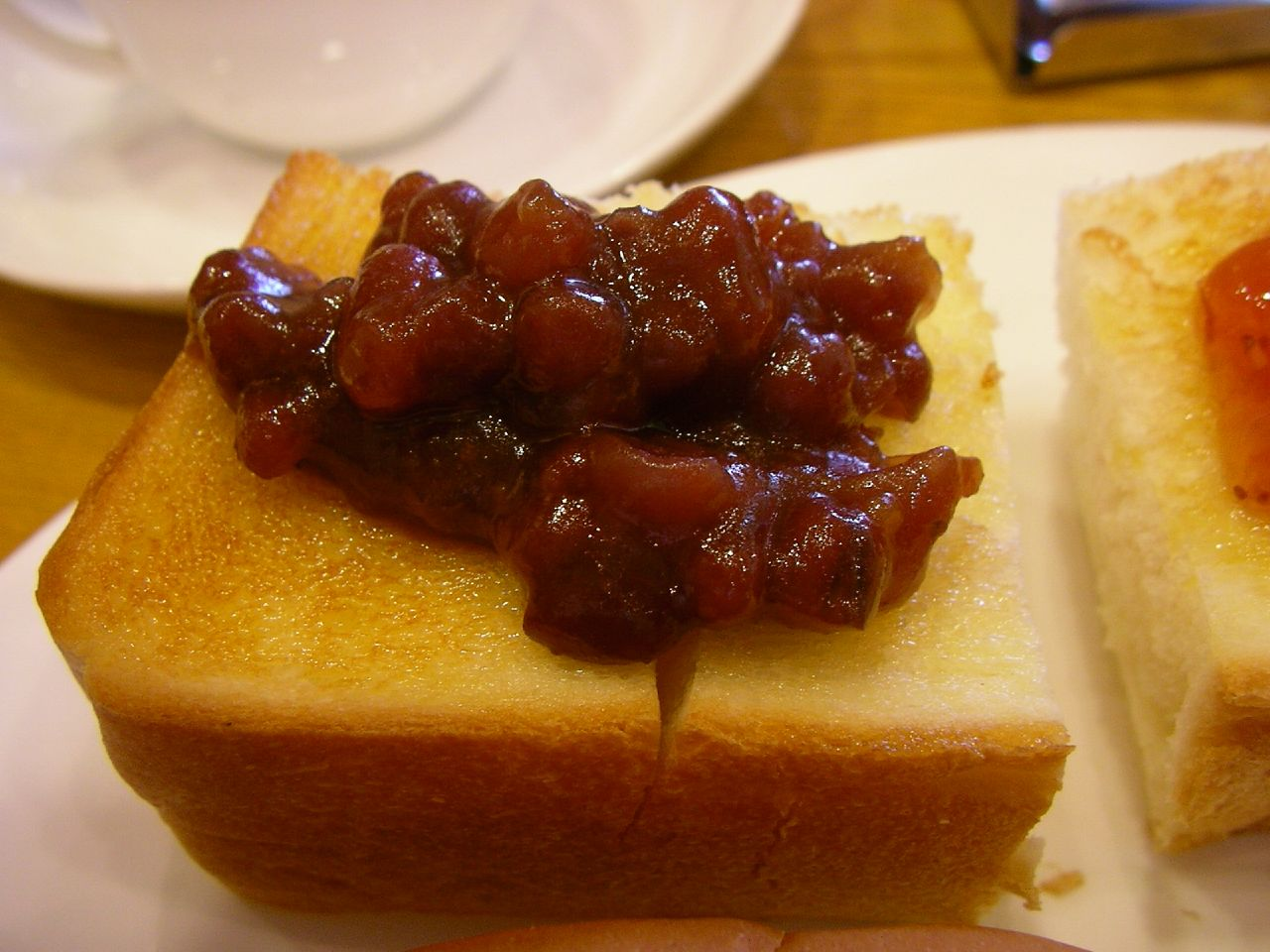

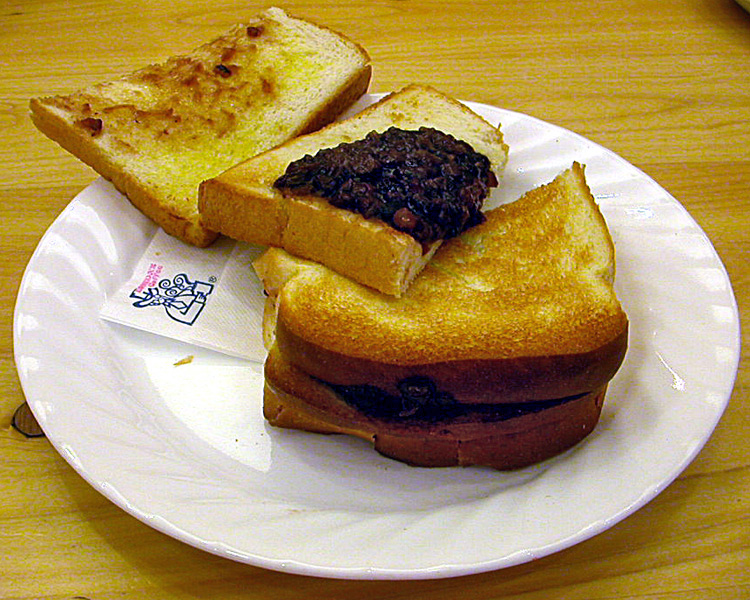
