= Killiney Kopitiam =

Singaporean coffee shop chain

Killiney Kopitiam is a Singapore-based chain of mass-market, traditional kopitiam (coffee shop) styled service cafes selling toast products (notably kaya toast), soft-boiled eggs and coffee.

Killiney Kopitiam was founded by Hainanese immigrants in 1919 and starting their business along the busy streets of Killiney Road. Formerly known as Kheng Hoe Heng Coffeeshop, it was later bought over by a regular customer Mr. Woon Tek Seng in 1992, a businessman who is also of Hainanese ancestry. He renamed it according to its location on Killiney Road.

== See also ==
- Ya Kun Kaya Toast
