= Kopitiam (company) =

Singaporean food court chain

Logo of Kopitiam

Kopitiam Investment Pte Ltd, more commonly known as Kopitiam, is a Singaporean food court chain focused on local cuisine. Under the FairPrice group along with NTUC FairPrice, NTUC Foodfare and Link, the group serves more than 2 million customers with over 100 million meals annually through its 100+ outlets located islandwide. Founded in 1988, it operates around 120+ outlets at many locations across Singapore, including Changi Airport, Plaza Singapura, VivoCity and Jem. Kopitiam also owns three subsidiary food court companies, Bagus, Cantine, and Sedap.

== Etymology ==
The name derives from the generic portmanteau term "kopi tiam". Kopi means coffee in Hokkien, and tiam is the Hokkien word for shop.

== History ==
On 21 September 2018, it was announced that NTUC Enterprise would acquire Kopitiam by the end of 2018. The acquisition was approved by the Competition and Consumer Commission of Singapore on 20 December 2018.

In November 2019, NTUC FairPrice, NTUC Foodfare, Kopitiam, and Link joined forces under the FairPrice Group to collectively serve the people of Singapore under the philosophy of "Everything Food Made Easy." As part of this partnership, Kopitiam and NTUC Foodfare were merged to form a single Food Services business unit. The aim of this unit is to provide nourishing meals through various formats, such as food courts in malls, coffee shops, hawker centers, quick-service cafes, and kiosks.

== See also ==
=== Other Singaporean food court chains ===
- Food Republic
- Koufu
