= Khao niao sangkhaya =

Traditional Thai dessert

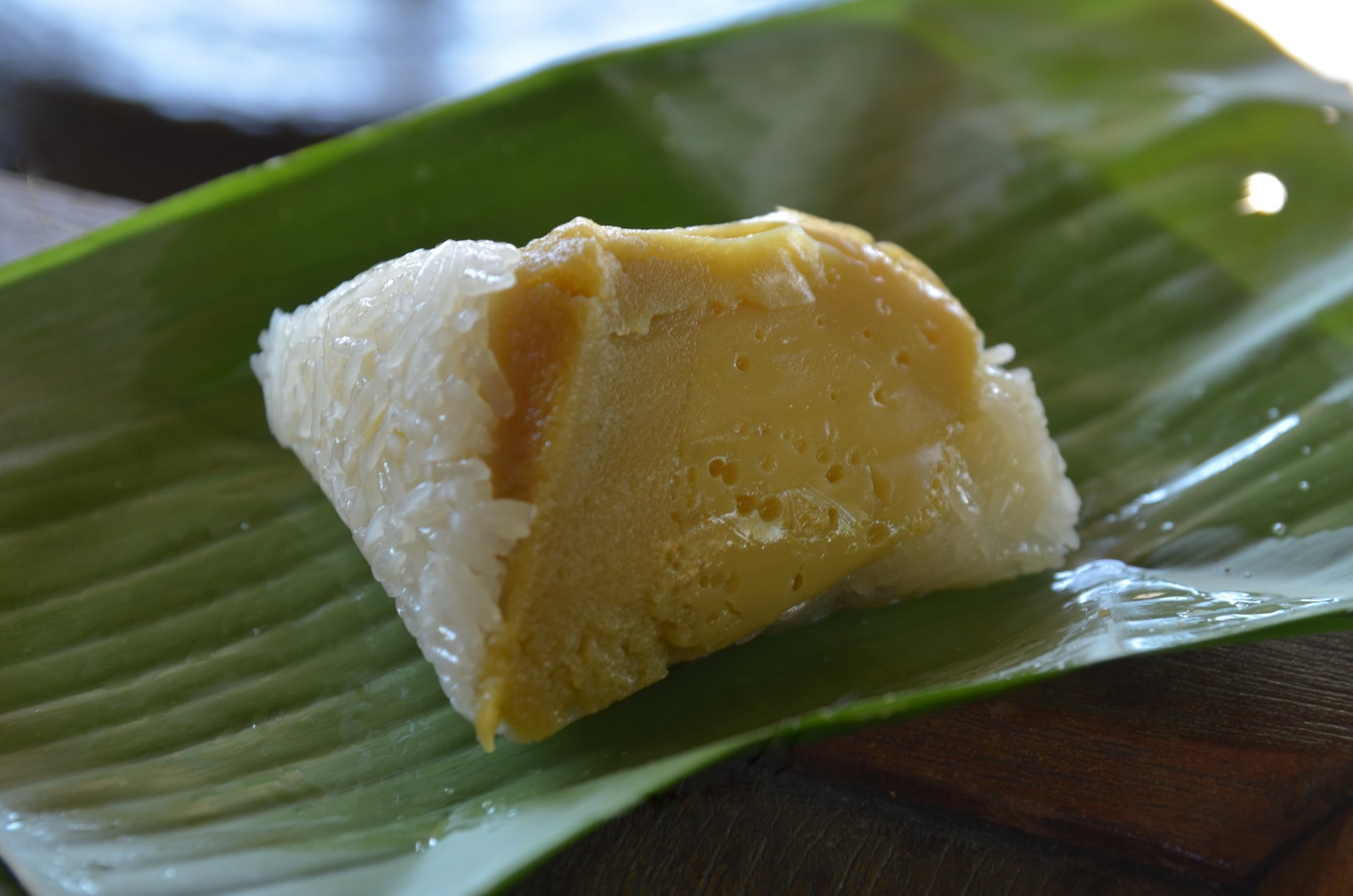
Khao niao sangkhaya

Khao niao sangkhaya (Thai: ข้าวเหนียวสังขยา, pronounced [kʰâ(ː)w nǐaw sǎŋ.kʰā.jǎː]) or sticky rice with custard, is a traditional Thai dessert. It is prepared with glutinous rice (commonly known as sticky rice), topped with coconut custard and coconut milk. Khao niao sangkhaya is served warm or at room temperature. The dessert is also found in other countries in Southeast Asia, such as Indonesia, Malaysia, Singapore, and the Philippines.

== History ==
Khao niao sangkhaya can be made according to different recipes and tastes, depending on specific cultures. In Thailand, the dish was influenced by Portuguese cuisine during the Ayutthaya period (1350–1767). Maria Guyomar de Pinha, who was known as the Queen of Thai desserts, introduced a revolutionary method of making Thai desserts by taking recipes from Portuguese cuisine, which are generally made from eggs, and this is how Sangkhaya was invented.

== Ingredients ==
The ingredients differ in each country. The most common ingredients are sticky rice, coconut milk, salt, palm sugar, and coconut custard, which is made of coconut cream, palm sugar, and coconut sugar.

== Availability ==
Khao Niao Sangkhaya is widely available in Asian markets. It can also be found at roadside stalls.
