= Kim San Leng =

Coffee-shop operator in Singapore

Kim San Leng 金山岭 金山嶺
- Logo of Kim San Leng, featuring the Chinese character 金 which corresponds to the first character of the company's name.
- Type: Private
- Industry: Food and Beverage
- Founded: Singapore; 1991; 35 years ago
- Founder: Hoon Thing Leong
- Number of locations: 35 outlets (2015)
- Website: kimsanleng.com.sg

Kim San Leng (simplified Chinese: 金山岭; traditional Chinese: 金山嶺; pinyin: jīn shān lǐng) is a Singaporean coffee-shop operator. One of Singapore’s largest coffee-shop operators, having more than 30 outlets across the island, it started from Kim San Eating House, opened by Hoon Moh Heng in 1950. Subsequently, under his eldest son Hoon Thing Leong, the business saw greater expansion with coffee-shop outlets around Singapore, most notably the Bishan outlet, purchased at $3.52 million in 1990. The business subsequently rebranded to Kim San Leng. Today, the coffee-shop chain is managed by the third generation of the Hoon family.

== History ==
=== Beginnings ===
In 1950, Hoon Moh Heng started a coffee-shop Kim San Eating House in Hougang. During the 1950s, the coffee-shop operators faced stiff competition from the street food hawkers, which were prolific across the island. In addition, issues with gangsterism in several areas of Singapore often meant other problems for operators, including gang extortion for protection fees and collateral damage or injuries caused by gang clashes. Despite the challenges, Hoon expanded the business to seven outlets by 1972.

In the 1960s, there was an organised effort to clean up the streets and regulate the street hawkers through registration, relocation and enforcement. This saw a reduction in street hawkers, as many of them were moved into premises such as the then-newly constructed hawker centres. This also proved to be a boon to the coffee-shop business as well, as hawkers began renting coffee-shop food-stalls to continue operations.

Hoon’s eldest son, Hoon Thing Leong, who supported his father’s business since he was thirteen, began to play a more active role in the business by the 1970s. In 1972, the 24-year-old Hoon got a loan from his father to finance his own coffee-shop venture, Jin Fa Coffeeshop in Bukit Timah, which he managed with the help of his younger brother. Subsequently, Hoon Thing Leong started to manage more of his father’s coffee-shop outlets, taking over as the business transitioned to the second-generation Hoon family.

=== Becoming Kim San Leng ===
Unlike the elder Hoon’s more risk-averse approach, the younger Hoon focused on greater expansion and branding, guided by the knowledge he gained from self-improvement opportunities. As a result, under the younger Hoon, the business entered greater national prominence by the 1990s, most notably with the 1990 $3.52 million acquisition of the Bishan coffee-shop site, which saw national news coverage.

The Bishan purchase was notable for its unprecedented price-tag which was more than double the starting bid, and it required both a bank loan and the elder Hoon selling two terrace houses. The younger Hoon decided this after much deliberation and consultation, with the site’s central location and its proximity to upcoming developments being key deciding factors. To also maximise the success of this endeavour, Hoon reached out to established hawkers to open stalls in this new coffee-shop. Hoon’s positive assessment was also validated by subsequent bids offered to him, with other interested parties willing to pay much higher prices to purchase the site from him. Nonetheless, some commentators were sceptical, considering him a “lunatic”.

This high-value acquisition was later considered a milestone in the modernisation of Singapore’s coffee-shop industry. Alongside the decision to name this new coffee-shop Kim San Leng Food Centre after his father’s first coffee-shop, Hoon also rebranded all his coffee-shop outlets to Kim San Leng, marking the official beginning of the brand.

Furthermore, Hoon also introduced innovations into coffee-shop operations, such as the installation of automatic shutters to allow for a more efficient opening and closing process. Television advertising for the hawkers, which was unprecedented in this traditional industry, also began under Hoon, as part of a modernising trend to keep the business relevant and competitive.

The Bishan coffee-shop saw success in the following years, with the initial cost being recouped within the first ten years. This success was also instrumental in boosting the Kim San Leng brand, driving further coffee-shop acquisitions across the island, including sites in Yishun and Bukit Panjang. With the increased publicity from this success, Hoon was also given the moniker of “Coffee-Shop King".

Hoon’s style of management focused on building positive relationships, and this could be also seen from the selection of hawker tenants, as Hoon implemented a stringent character assessment to ensure credibility. This arguably played a part in further ensuring sustainability in the coffee-shop operations, minimising inter-stall conflicts.

=== Kim San Leng in the 21st Century ===
Innovation continued to be key in Kim San Leng’s business model, with inspirations being drawn from other establishments around the world, such as Taiwan, where the customer experience went beyond consumption alone. This led to improvements to stall designs, to make them visibly appealing to customers. Nonetheless, Hoon maintained a balance in both business innovation and tradition, ensuring that the changes would not be too drastic, driving away the older clientele.

Hoon’s children also became more actively involved in the business operations over time. With Hoon's passing in 2021, his son Andy Hoon became the CEO. Under third-generation leadership, Kim San Leng underwent greater innovation, which included expanding its online presence to boost exposure for its outlets and hawker tenants. A greater focus in bridging the digital divide between the older hawkers and customers was also spearheaded by Andy Hoon, who saw this as a priority for Kim San Leng and its hawker tenants to remain competitive.

In 2017 Kim San Leng supported local non-profit organisation Lien Foundation's Forget Us Not initiative, which focuses on supporting people with dementia in the neighbourhood. This initiative was implemented in the Bishan outlet, where decals describing common encounters with dementia sufferers in the coffee-shop were placed on all tables to raise awareness. Several hawkers were also trained to better identify and support customers with dementia.

During the COVID-19 pandemic, Kim San Leng also launched online efforts to support the hawker tenants, including collaborating with food delivery service Grab to launch a “Mix and Match” order platform for several coffee-shop outlets, as well as an in-house order website, which was well-received by the hawkers. Furthermore, Kim San Leng took part in the Feed the City Initiative by DBS and Food Bank, a programme providing meals to disadvantaged families across Singapore.

In 2024, Kim San Leng collaborated with Culture Singapore to launch Neighbourhood Desk Tunes at its Yishun outlet, bringing live music performances into the coffee-shop.
