= Ipoh white coffee =

Coffee drink from Ipoh, Malaysia

Ipoh white coffee Kopi putih Ipoh كوڤي ڤوتيه إيڤوه 怡保白咖啡 ஈப்போ ஒயிட் காபி
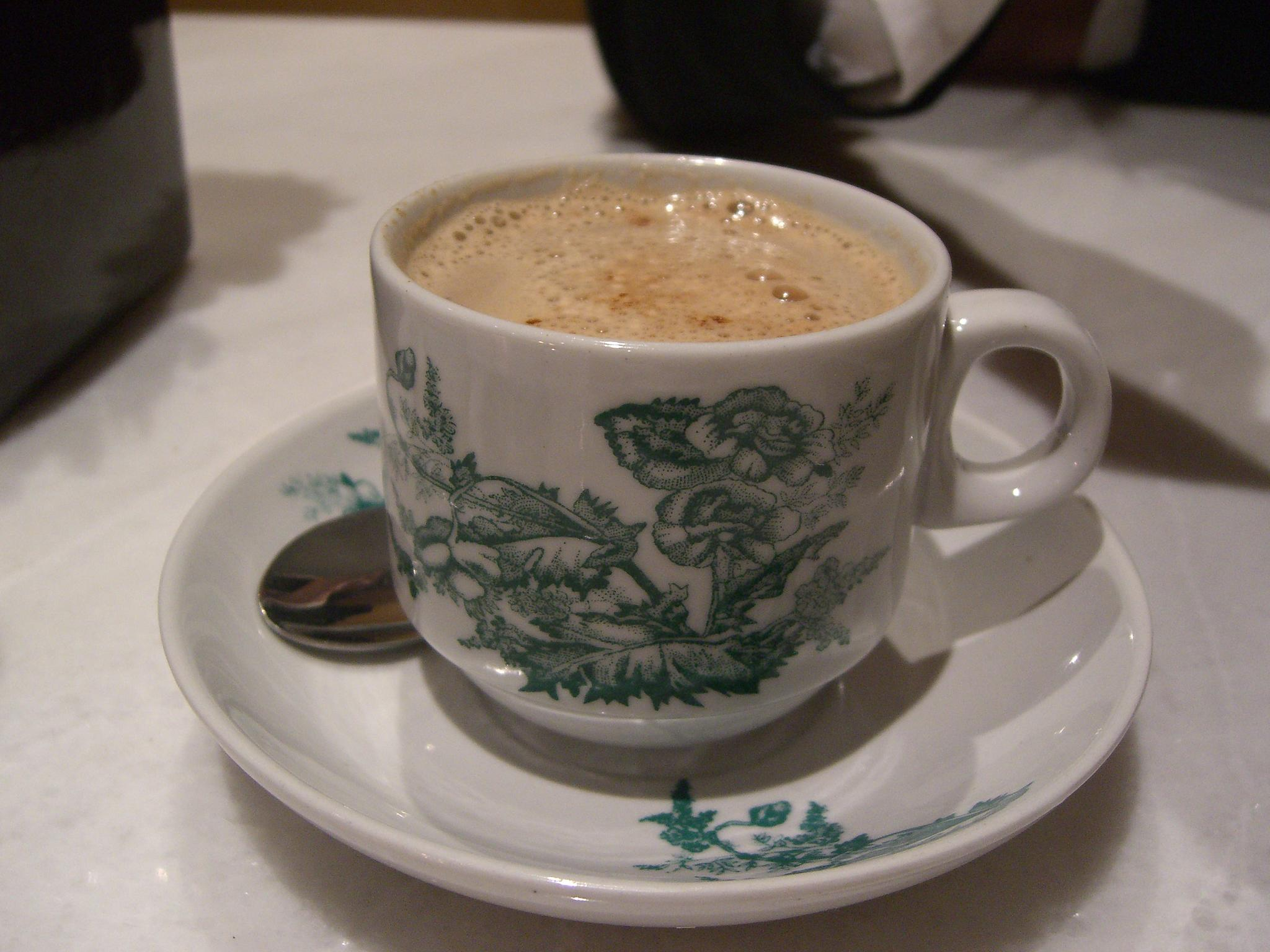
- A cup of Ipoh white coffee in Old Town Kopitiam in Melbourne, Australia
- Place of origin: Ipoh, Malaysia
- Region or state: Southeast Asia
- Associated cuisine: Malaysian
- Serving temperature: Hot or cold
- Main ingredients: Coffee powder, condensed milk

Ipoh white coffee (Chinese: 怡保白咖啡, Tamil: ஒயிட் காபி) is a popular coffee drink which originated in Ipoh, Perak, Malaysia, resulting in Ipoh being named one of the top three coffee towns by Lonely Planet. The coffee beans are roasted with palm oil margarine, and the resulting coffee is served with condensed milk.

== Origins ==
The term white coffee originates from the literal translation of its Chinese name, which was introduced in the 19th century by Chinese migrants who came to work in the local tin mines. The coffee beans themselves are not actually white; the colour comes from the milk stirred into the end product.

In Malaysia, the original white coffee started in the Ipoh and was a drink made from beans roasted in margarine and served with sweetened condensed milk. This style of coffee continues to be popular throughout the country. However, white coffee in Malaysia often simply refers to how the drink is prepared and presented – with margarine.

Overseas visitors finding the margarine-roasted coffee beans unorthodox (due to their slight caramelized flavor) are often misled into thinking that there is a type of coffee bean endemic to Malaysia called the "white coffee bean". The beans used are invariably imported beans roasted to a light color.

Local coffee manufacturers now mix instant coffee powder with non-dairy creamer or whitener and sugar, and market the 3-in-1 mixture as white coffee as well. The mixture is preferred by Malaysians at home or in the office as a convenient easy-to-prepare coffee drink. The advisability, however, of consuming instant coffee mixed with non-dairy creamer and sugar daily is slowly coming into question, with some manufacturers now taking the sugar out of the mixture, and marketing the 2-in-1 mixture as sugar-free white coffee.

== Styles ==
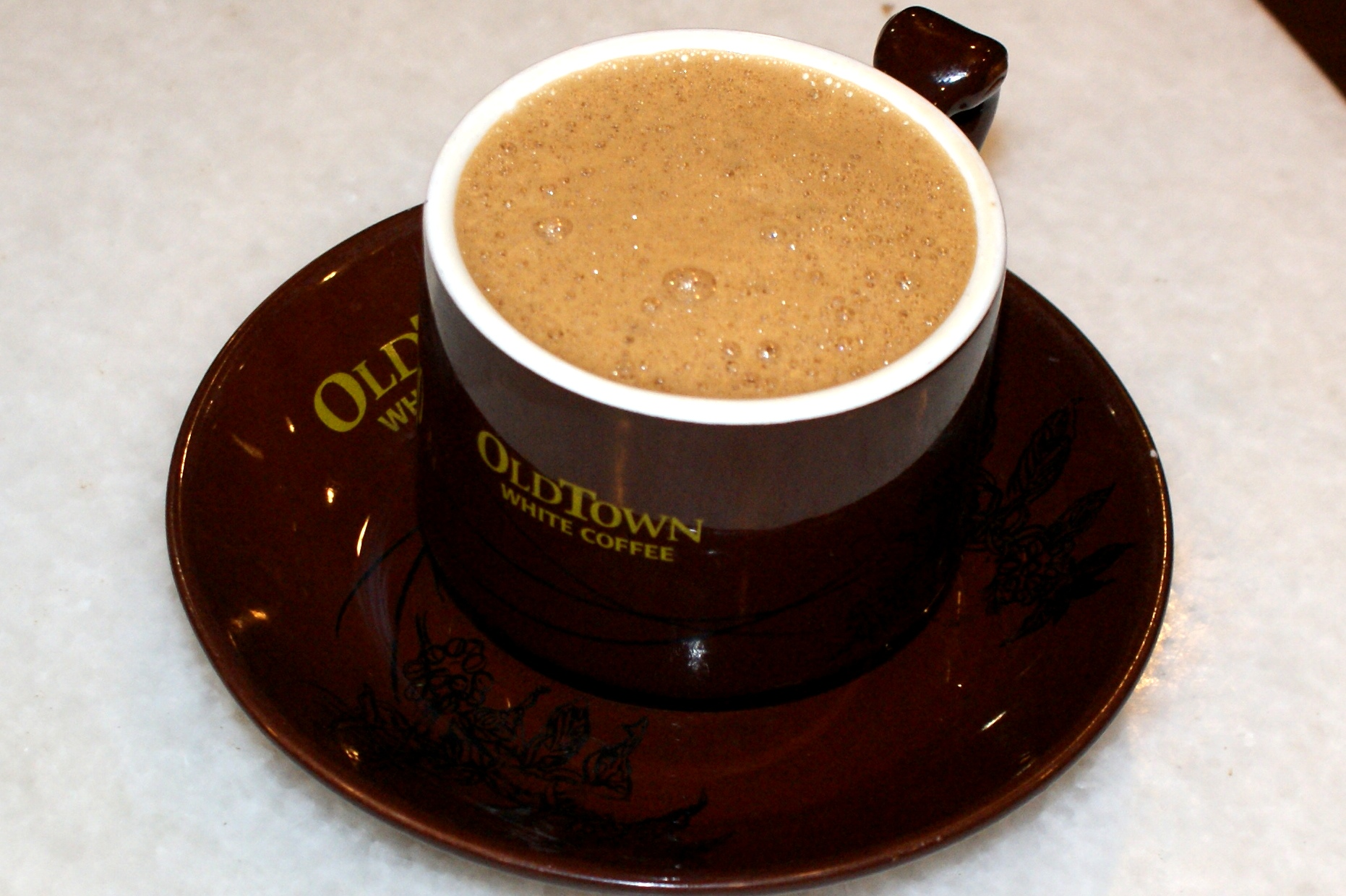
Cup of white coffee

Traditionally, Malaysian-style roasted black coffee, kopi O, is produced by roasting the beans with sugar, margarine and wheat.

White coffee, on the other hand, is produced with only margarine and without any sugar, resulting in a less dark roast. Ipoh white coffee is also widely available in an instant version. It is sometimes consumed after dinner.

The generic term Ipoh white coffee in Chinese is Chinese: 怡保白咖啡; Jyutping: Ji4bou2 Baak6 Kaa1fei1. Chinese: 白; pinyin: bái; Jyutping: Baak6, commonly meaning 'white', has nothing to do with the colour in this instance, but is rather a reference to the way the coffee is roasted. In Chinese, bái also means 'without' or 'unadulterated'.

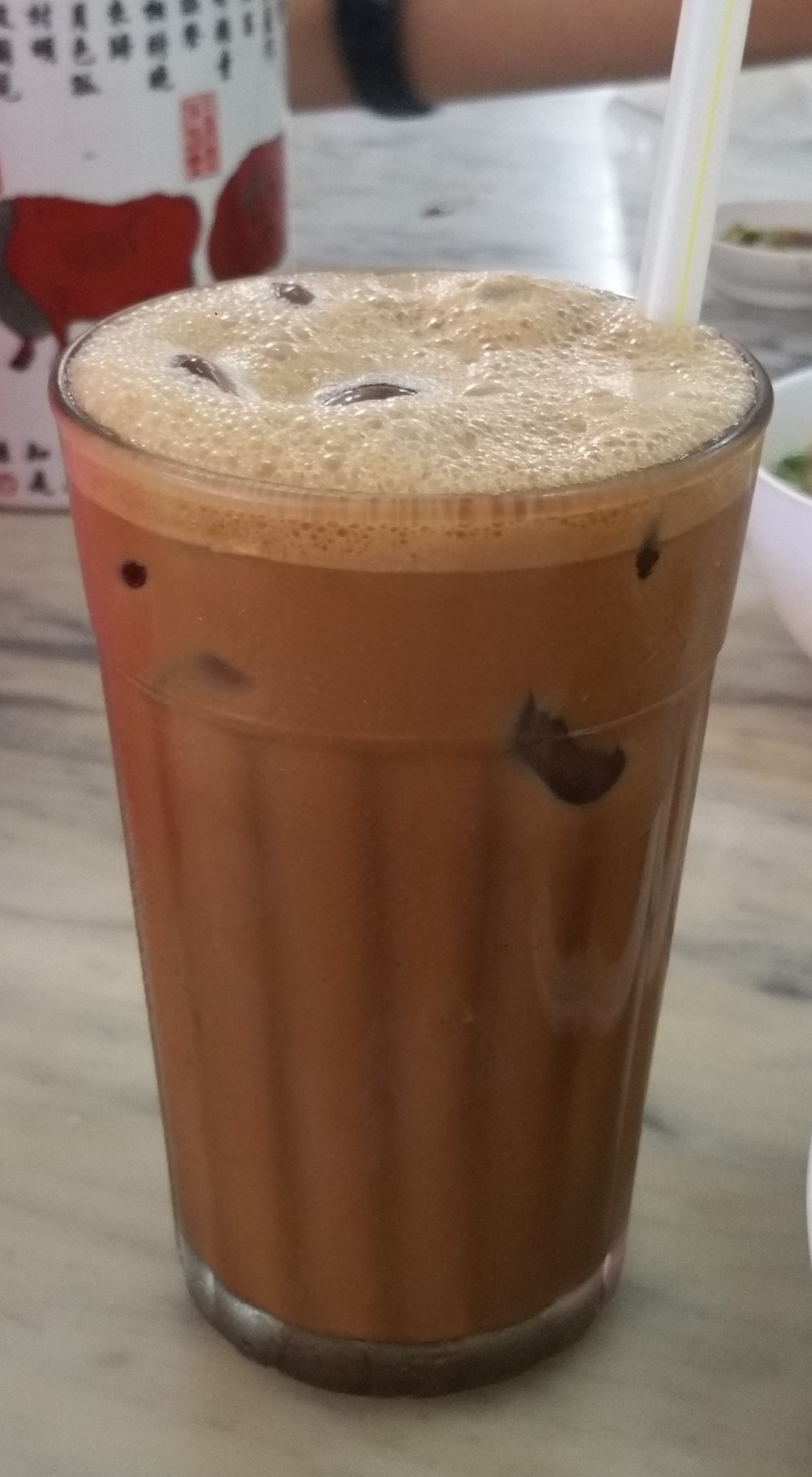
A glass of iced Ipoh white coffee in Menglembu, Ipoh, Malaysia

== See also ==
- Oldtown White coffee
- Raf coffee
- List of coffee drinks
