= Coconut jam =

Jam made with coconut milk

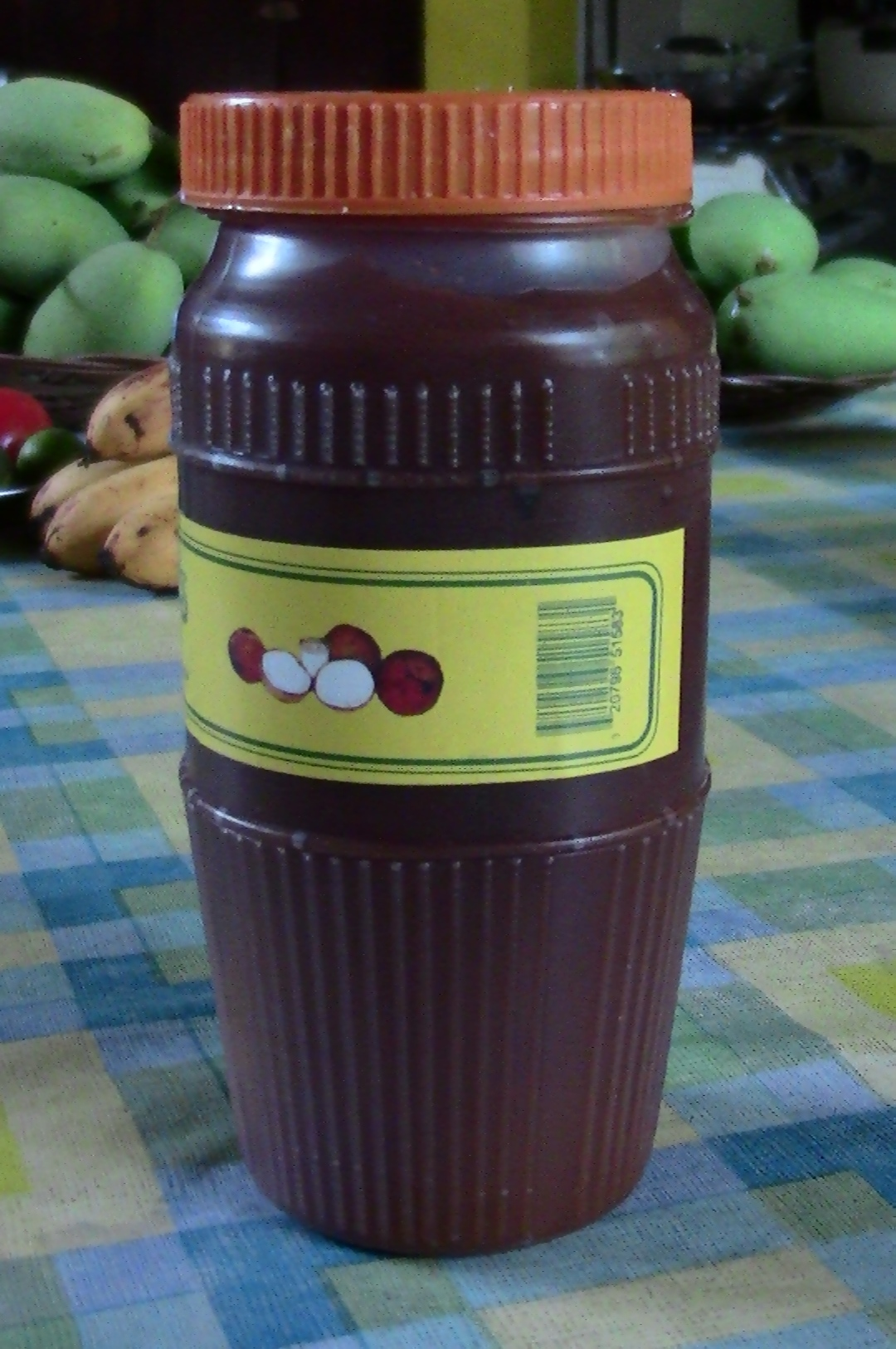
- A jar of matamís sa báo from the Philippines
- Alternative names: sekaya; seri kaya; srikaya; matamís sa báo, matamís na báo ( Philippines); sangkhaya (Thailand); cadé (Vietnam); 咖椰 (Chinese communities); siamu popo (Samoa)
- Type: Spread, dip
- Region or state: Malaysia & Singapore
- Associated cuisine: Malaysia, Singapore, Indonesia, Brunei, Philippines, and Thailand, Samoa
- Created by: Portuguese diaspora in Malay World
- Main ingredients: Coconut, sugar, eggs

Coconut jam, also known as kaya jam or simply kaya, is a sweet spread made from a base of coconut milk, eggs, sugar and sometimes pandan leaves as flavouring. It is popular throughout Southeast Asia.

== Origin ==
The origins of kaya are subject to various interpretations. Some sources suggest it is a Eurasian jam unique to Singapore and Malaysia, adapted from a Portuguese egg jam. Others propose that Hainanese immigrants created kaya toast by adapting what they had previously prepared while serving on British ships during the Straits Settlements period.

In Thailand, a similar spread is known as sangkhaya, while in the Philippines, an eggless version called matamís sa báo is made from coconut cream and sugar.

The spread's widespread popularity across these regions has led to various adaptations and flavors, making kaya a versatile and beloved component of Southeast Asian cuisine.

== Indonesia, Malaysia and Singapore ==
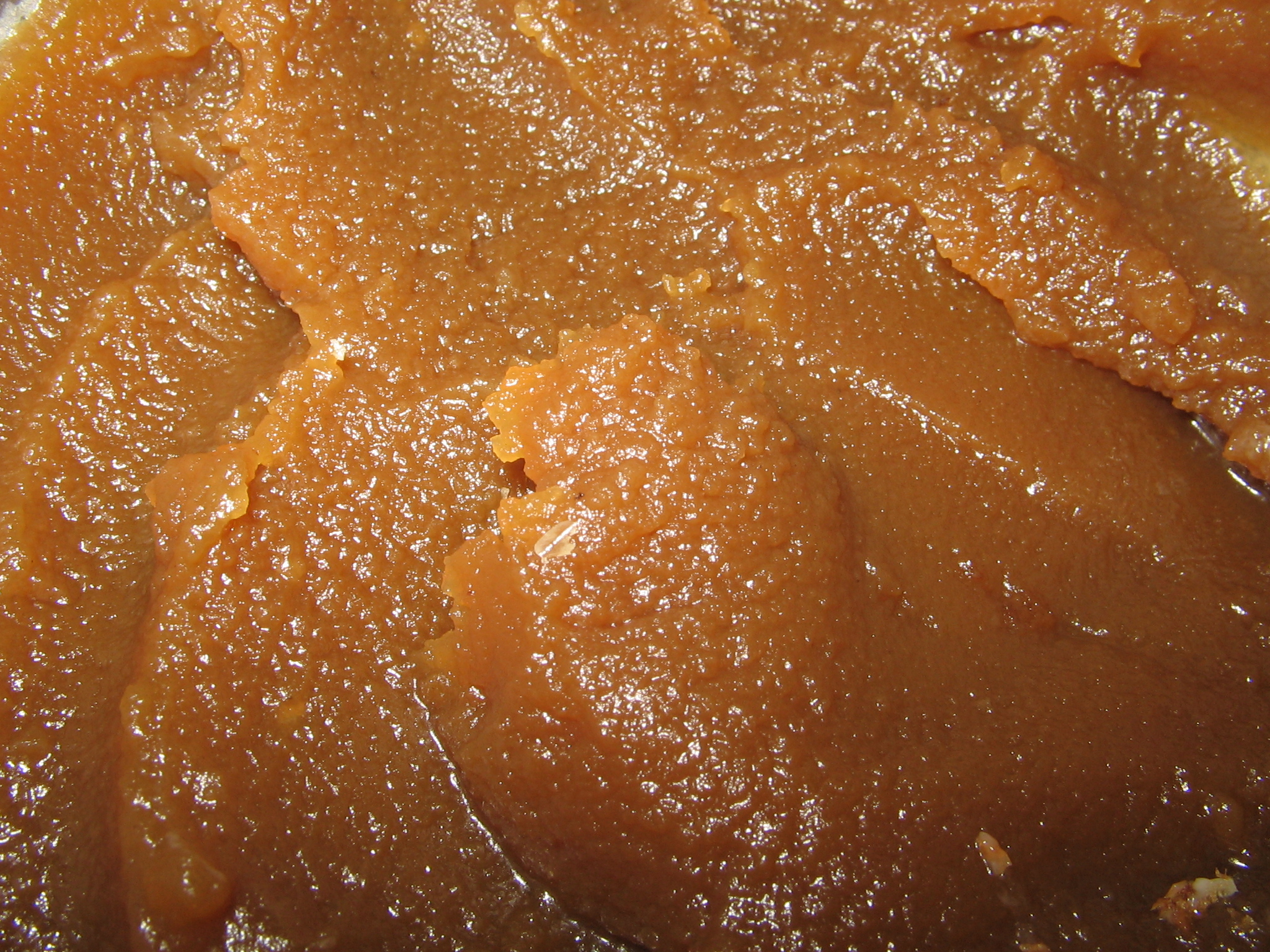
A close-up of Kaya from Malaysia showing texture

The word for coconut jam in the Malay language, kaya, means rich, referencing the texture of the popular food. It is also called srikaya. In Malaysia, Indonesia and Singapore, kaya has a creamy texture. It is made from coconut milk (locally known as 'santan') and duck or chicken eggs, flavored with pandan leaves and sweetened with sugar. The resulting color varies depending on the color of the egg yolks, the amount of pandan, and the extent of the caramelization of the sugar. As a popular local spread, kaya is typically spread on toast to make kaya toast and eaten in the morning, but is also enjoyed throughout the day. Kaya can be found in most kopitiam and night markets.

Different varieties available include the nyonya kaya, which is of a lighter-green color, and Hainanese kaya, which is of a darker brown and uses caramelized sugar, and is often further sweetened with honey.

In this region, kaya is also used as a topping for several desserts including pulut taitai or pulut tekan, a dessert of sweet glutinous rice colored blue with butterfly pea flowers (bunga telang), and pulut seri muka, a similar dessert but colored green due to adding pandan leaves. It is also used with glutinous rice to make kuih seri kaya.

== Philippines ==
Philippine coconut jam is known as matamís sa báo (also matamís na báo or minatamís na báo, among other names), which all literally mean "sweetened coconut". It is different from other Southeast Asian versions in that it uses coconut cream (kakang gatâ, the first and second press of grated coconut meat) and cane sugar extract or molasses or treacle. It also does not use eggs and thus is more like syrup rather than custard. It is often eaten on toast or pandesal or used as a filling for pan de coco. When it is mixed with ground glutinous rice paste, it becomes a popular dessert known as kalamay.

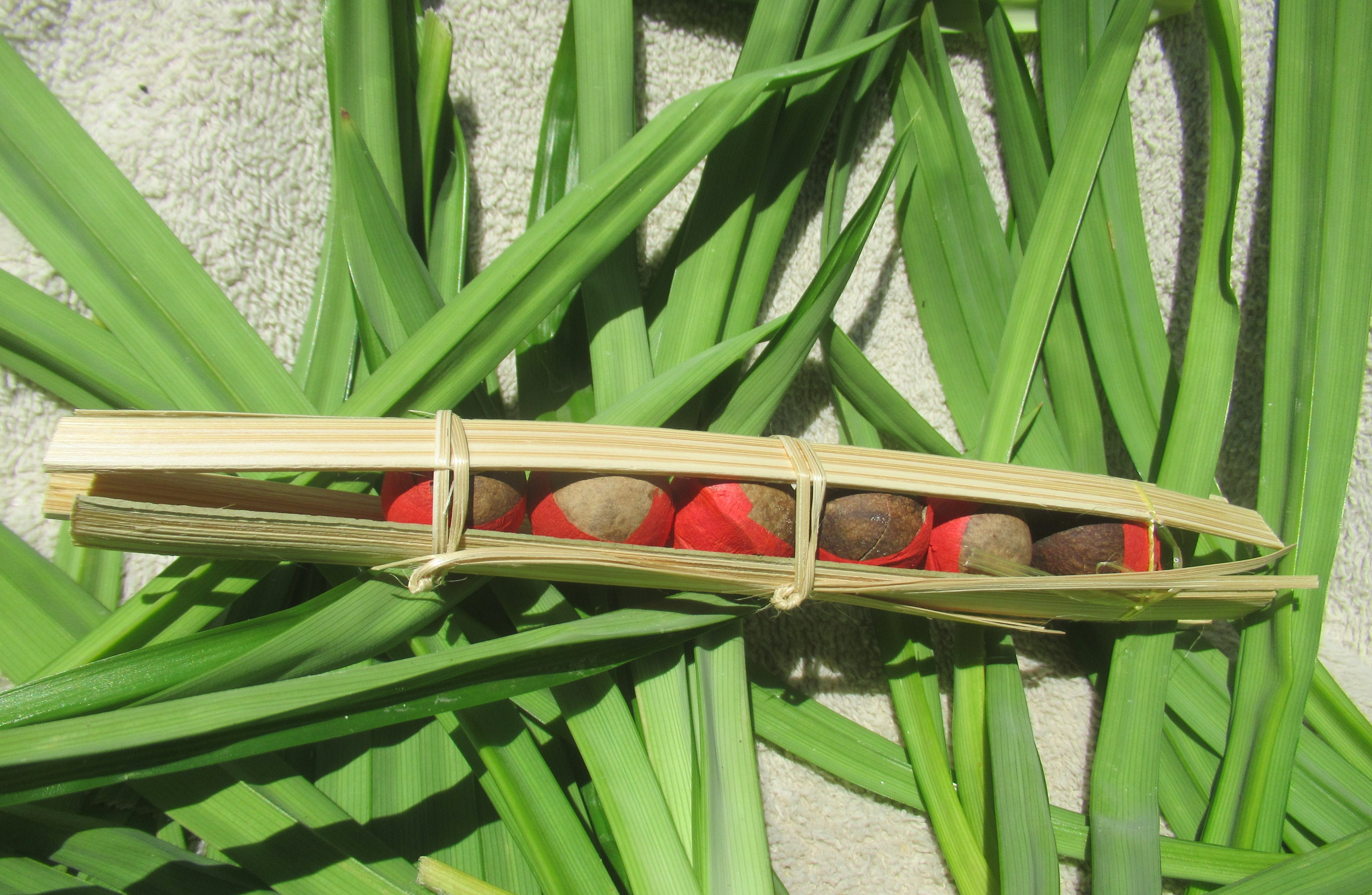
Sundót kulangot in Lingayen

A less viscous version made with coconut milk (gatâ) is known as latík (anglicized as "coconut caramel"), and is used instead of syrup in numerous native Filipino desserts.

== Thailand ==
The kaya of Thailand is called sangkhaya (Thai: สังขยา, pronounced [sǎŋkʰàjǎː]) in Thai. There are two major types of kaya eaten in Thailand. One type is more liquid than the other, while the less thick kaya is similar to what is eaten in Malaysia and Indonesia. People either spread it on steamed or toasted bread or dip the bread into kaya. This kind of kaya is commonly sold by street vendors but has recently been brought into tea and coffee shops.

Another type is a concoction that has a less sticky and more custard-like texture. It is sometimes called "coconut custard" in English and is used to make sangkhaya fakthong (สังขยาฟักทอง, [sǎŋkʰàjǎː fáktʰɔ̄ːŋ]; sangkhaya maryu in Lao), sangkhaya pumpkin or custard pumpkin, khao niao sangkhaya (ข้าวเหนียวสังขยา, [kʰâːw nǐaw sǎŋkʰàjǎː]), glutinous rice topped with sangkhaya, and sangkhaya maphrao (สังขยามะพร้าว, [sǎŋkʰàjǎː māpʰráːw]), sangkhaya served in a coconut.

== Samoa ==
Coconut jam is known in Samoa as siamu popo. The word siamu in Samoan is loaned from English "jam" and popo refers to a mature coconut that is used for eating, usually for the extraction of coconut cream. The preparation of siamu popo does not require eggs, the sugar is caramelised and coconut cream and citrus leaves are added. It has a consistency resembling a mixture of syrup and caramel. Siamu popo is often used as a spread on toast and is used in desserts, most often used as a filling for a doughnut called a german bun.

== See also ==
- Kalamay
- Kaya toast
- Latik
- Roti bakar
- Sankya lapov
- Nata de coco
- Watalappam
- List of spreads
