= Raf coffee =

Coffee drink made using espresso and vanilla sugar

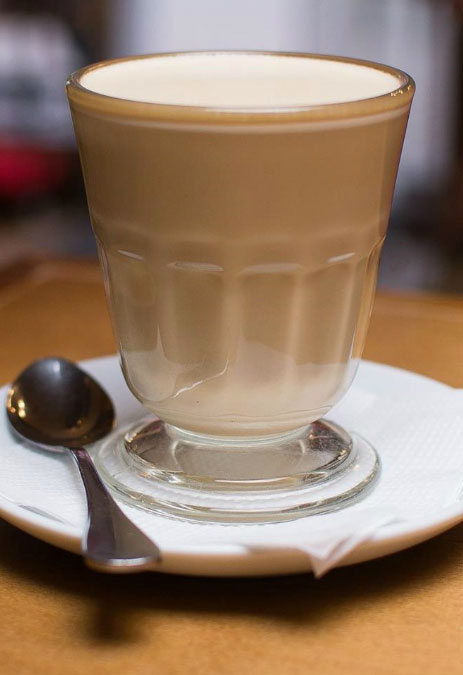
- Type: Coffee
- Origin: Russia

Raf coffee (Russian: раф-кофе) is a popular coffee drink in some countries of the former USSR, which appeared in the late 1990s in Russia. It is prepared by adding cream and vanilla sugar to a single shot of espresso and then foaming the mix with the espresso machine's steam wand. The main differences from a latte are the use of vanilla sugar and cream instead of milk and the fact that the whole mix is foamed together instead of just milk. Vanilla sugar is often substituted with syrup.

== Recipe ==
First, some syrup is poured into the coffee container, then 35 mL of espresso is added. Then warmed cream is added with a fat content of no more than 30% with the addition of vanilla sugar, and all the ingredients are heated to 66 °C (151 °F) degrees in a pitcher. Often, ready-made raf is sprinkled with ground cinnamon. There are various variations of the drink with the addition of specific ingredients: alcohol, honey instead of sugar, lavender etc.

== History ==
Raf coffee appeared in 1996–1997 as a result of experiments in the Moscow coffeehouse "Coffee Bean". One of their regular customers, Rafael Timerbaev, asked the barista to serve him something new. As a result of the experimentations of three baristas (Gleb Neveikin, Artem Berestov and Galina Samokhina), a new beverage was created, originally named "coffee for Raf". Later, visitors began to ask for "the same coffee as Raf", and gradually the name was shortened to "Raf coffee" or simply "Raf". After a while, this coffee drink became popular in all coffeehouses throughout Russia. It is considered a very popular coffee drink in Moscow. By 2018, raf coffee has spread beyond the borders of Russia – coffeehouses in Ukraine, Kyrgyzstan, Kazakhstan, Moldova and Belarus also prepare it. Outside the CIS, raf coffee is practically unknown, although according to some sources, this drink is also made in some Czech coffeehouses.

Some Russian coffee experts criticize raf coffee for the fact that the taste of cream and vanilla sugar practically drowns out the aroma of espresso, however, they admit that this coffee drink is one of the few coffee innovations originally from Russia. In addition, the very fact of the popularity of a rather sweet drink is indicated by them as a characteristic feature of Russian coffee culture.

== See also ==
- Latte
