= Kopitiam =

Coffee shop in Southeast Asian countries

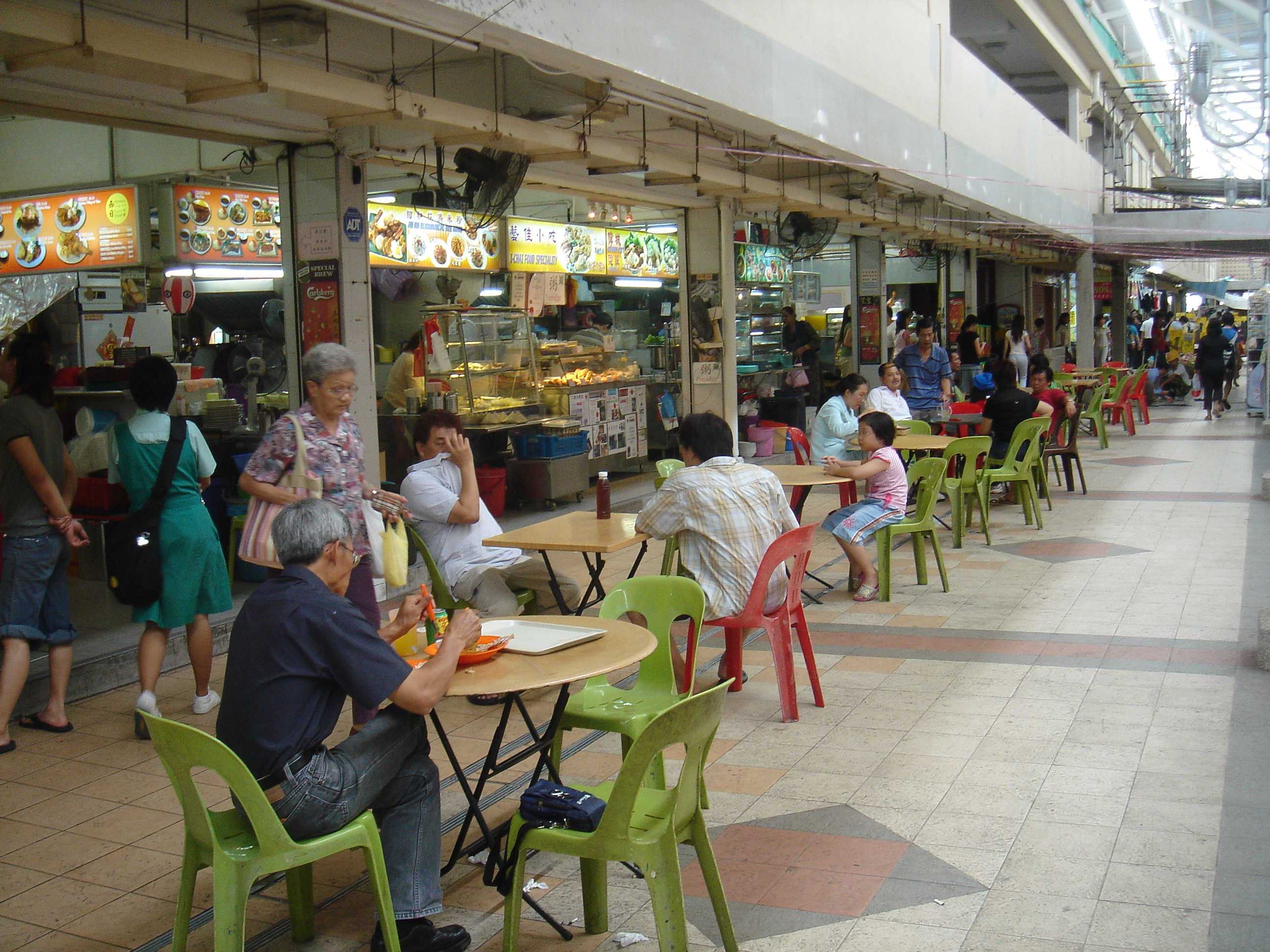
A typical open-air kopitiam in Singapore

A kopitiam or kopi tiam is a type of coffee shop found in Indonesia (particularly in Sumatra and Kalimantan), Malaysia, Singapore, Brunei and Southern Thailand, patronised for meals and drinks, and traditionally operated by the Chinese communities of these countries.

The word kopi is the Indonesian and Malay term for 'coffee', while tiam derives from the Hokkien term for 'shop' (Chinese: 店; Pe̍h-ōe-jī: tiàm).

== Malaysia ==
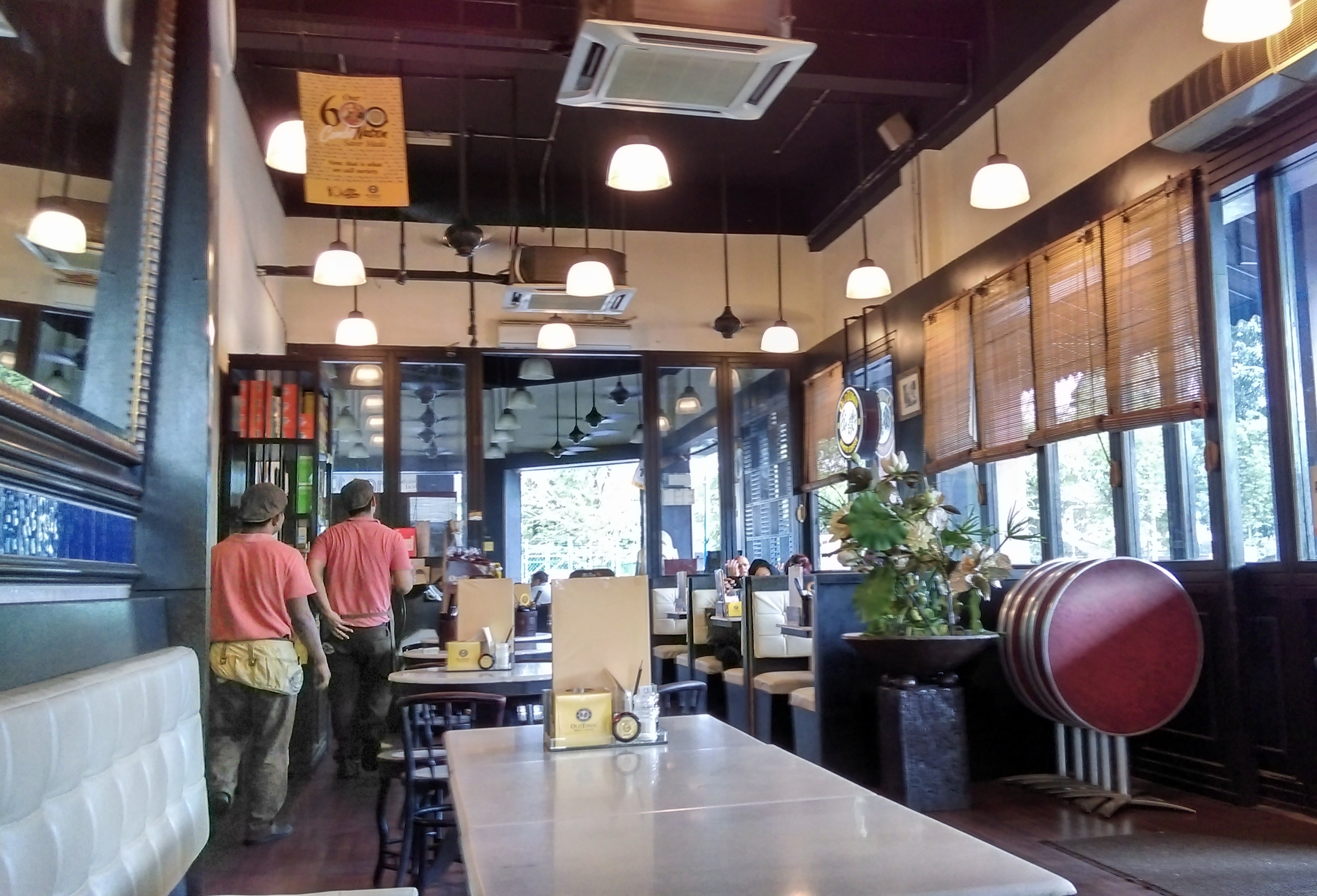
An OldTown White Coffee Outlet in Taman Permata, Kuala Lumpur. This is one of the contemporary kopitiam outlets in Malaysia.

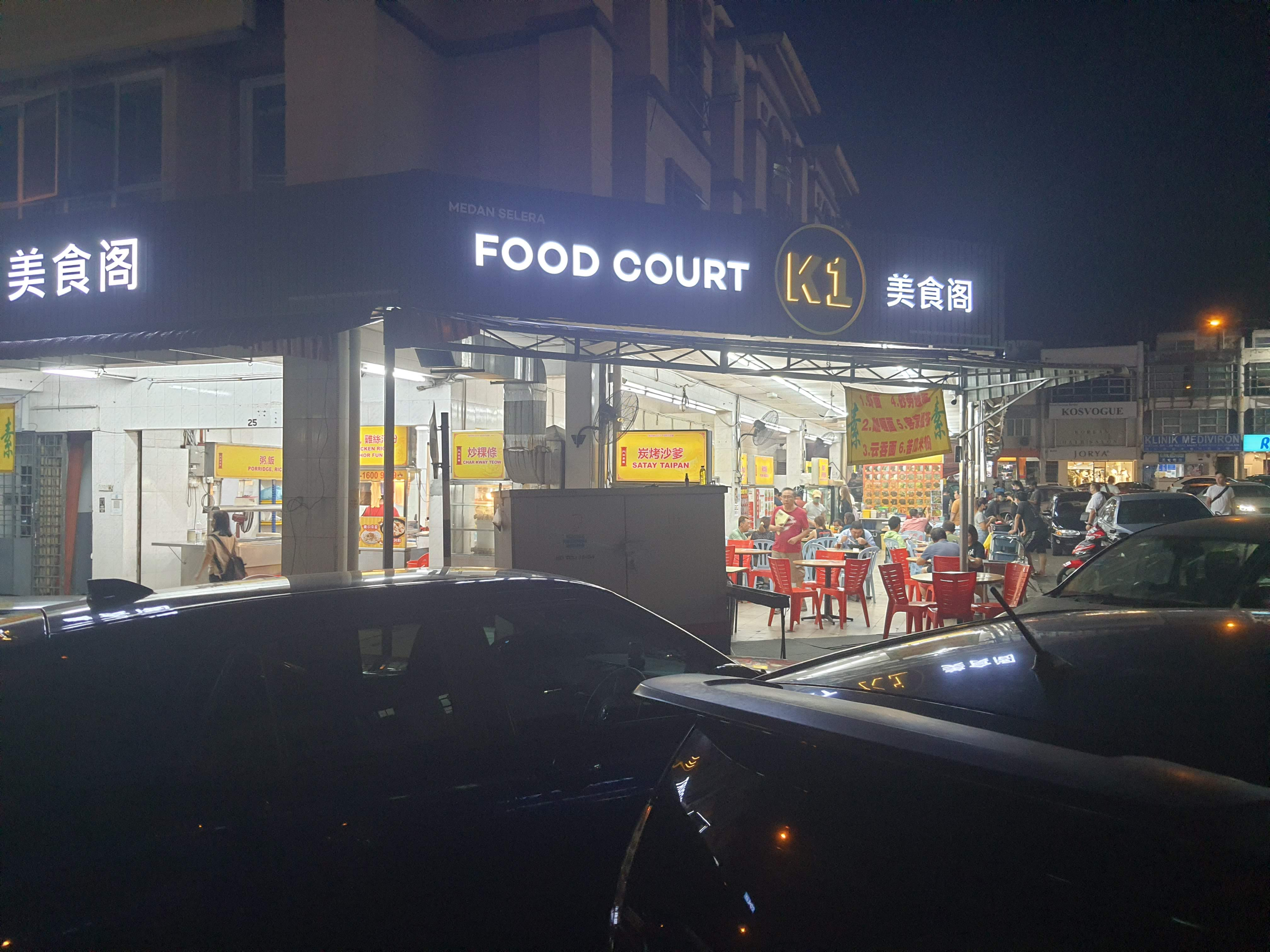
A standard kopitiam operating in the night time. Corner lots tend to be highly favorable to operators due to their visibility and to accommodate more stalls.

In Malaysia, as in Singapore, kopitiams are found almost everywhere. However, there are a few differences. In Malaysia:

- the term kopitiam in Malaysia is usually a reference to Malaysian Chinese coffee shops that generally serve non-halal food;
- food courts and hawker centres are usually not referred to as kopitiams though the latter do often serve what is traditionally considered hawker fare.

Kopitiam are generally owned and operated by Malaysian Chinese from the Foochow and Hainanese dialect groups, many of whom began their businesses during the British colonial period. Though variations exist, kopitiam are generally structured along the lines of the owner selling drinks and a small selection of food including kaya toast and half-boiled eggs, while hawkers rent space to sell other offerings including noodles, rice dishes, and Western cuisine among others.

Alongside more traditional locales, Malaysia increasingly features "modern" kopitiams that present a more gentrified and sanitised eatery that tap into a nostalgic aesthetic but operate essentially as fast-food outlets appealing to a younger and more professional clientele. These tend to be more corporate franchises that can be found in shopping centres rather than the old-school shophouses. Examples include Old Town White Coffee, Oriental Kopi, Uncle Lim's, Nanyang Cafe, and Hock Kee Kopitiam among others. To tap into the sizeable Muslim market, these kopitiams usually serve food that is prepared to conform to Islamic dietary laws, unlike the traditional shophouse kopitiams.

Today, more than 100 modern kopitiam brands operate across various parts of Malaysia.

Kopitiams in Ipoh's Oldtown district serve Ipoh white coffee. The coffee beans are roasted with palm-oil margarine and with less sugar, resulting in a brew that is lighter in colour than normal coffee beans that use sugar – hence the name 'white coffee'.

== Singapore ==
Kopitiams in Singapore are commonly found in almost all residential areas as well as some industrial and business districts in the country, numbering about 2,000 in total. Although most are an aggregate of small stalls or shops, some may be more reminiscent of food courts, although each stall has a similar appearance and the same style of signage. Usually, in a typical kopitiam, the owner will either manage the tze char stall, which usually sells simple stir-fry dishes made to order, or the drinks stall which sells coffee, tea, soft drinks and other beverages as well as breakfast items like kaya toast, soft-boiled eggs, and snacks.

In Singapore, the coffee in kopitiams is made from Robusta beans. Kopi was introduced to the island in the mid-19th century. Robusta beans, brought in from Indonesia via Arab traders, were preferred by the majority of the local population, compared to the more expensive Arabica beans favoured by the European population working in Singapore.

Most kopitiams in Singapore consist of the drinks stall and food stalls leased by independent stallholders who mainly focus on a variety of food dishes that are commonly found in Singaporean cuisine. Traditional dishes from different ethnicities are usually available at kopitiams to encourage people from different ethnic backgrounds with different dietary habits to dine in a common place or even at a common table.

Kopitiam is also the name of a food court chain in Singapore.

Some of the popular kopitiams in Singapore include Kim San Leng, Killiney & Tong Ah Eating House, or Ya Kun Kaya Toast.

Some of the more common foods that can be seen in kopitiams, besides the ever-popular soft-boiled eggs and toast, consist of char kway tiao (fried flat rice noodles (hor fun), sometimes cooked with eggs and cockles), Hokkien mee (yellow wheat noodles served with various seafood, pork slices, egg, and served with a calamansi and spicy chilli paste on the side), chicken rice and nasi lemak (a Malay dish of coconut-flavoured rice, served with sambal, egg, roasted peanuts, fried anchovies, etc.).

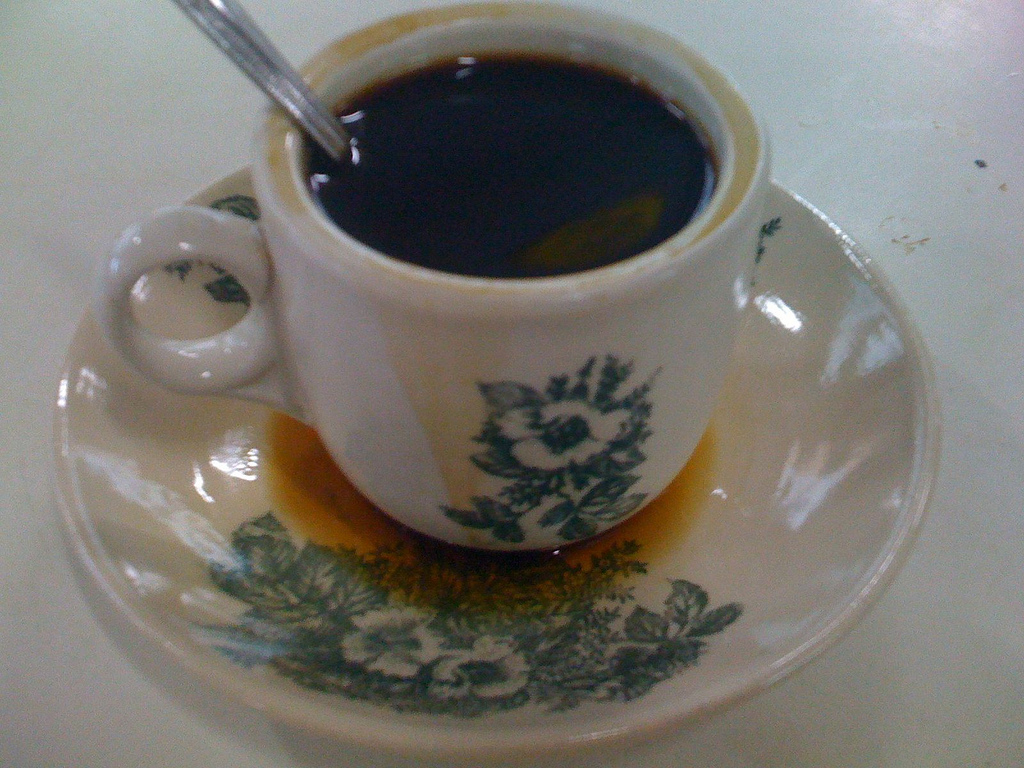
Traditional Kopi O commonly served in Malaysia and Singapore

== "Coffee shop talk" ==
"Coffee shop talk" is a phrase used to describe gossip because it is often a familiar sight at kopitiams where a group of workers or senior citizens would linger over cups of coffee and exchange news and comments on various topics including national politics, office politics, TV dramas, sports, and food. Former Too Phat member Malique has a song called "Cerita Kedai Kopi", satirizing the stereotype.

== See also ==
- Punjabi dhaba
- Indonesian cuisine
- Kopi
- Malaysian cuisine
- Singaporean cuisine
- Hawker centre
- Pasar malam (night market)
- Mamak stall
- Warung
- Coffeeshop
- Cha chaan teng
- Carinderia
