= Cooking show =

Television genre that presents food preparation

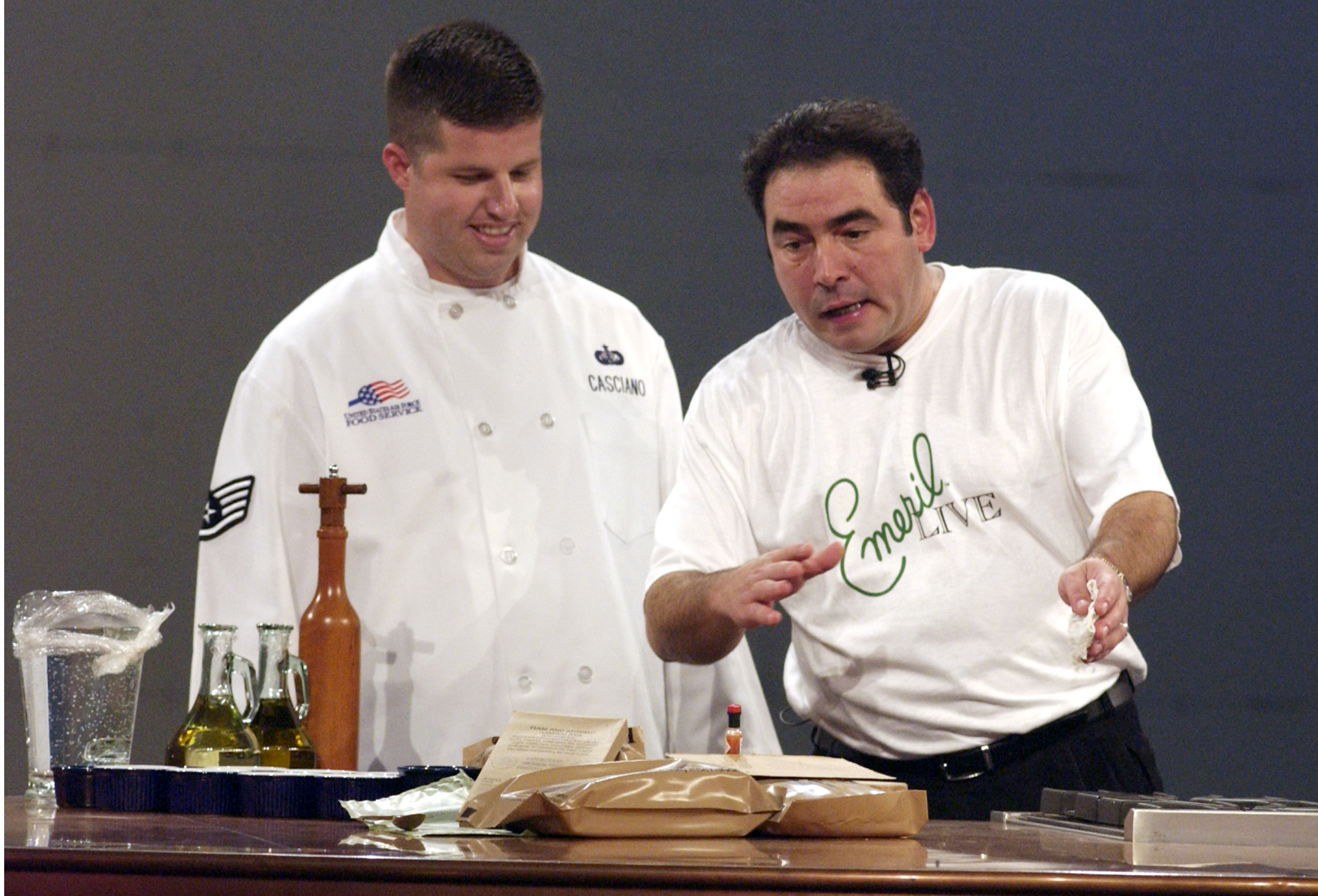
Emeril Lagasse (right) preparing food on the American cooking show Emeril Live in 2003

A cooking show, cookery show, or cooking program (also spelled cooking programme in British English) is a television genre that presents food preparation, often in a restaurant kitchen or on a studio set, or at the host's personal home. Typically the show's host, often a celebrity chef, prepares one or more dishes over the course of an episode, taking the viewing audience through the food's inspiration, preparation, and stages of cooking.

Cooking shows have been a popular staple of daytime TV programming since the earliest days of television. They are generally very inexpensive to produce, making them an economically easy way for a TV station to fill a half-hour (or sometimes 60-minute) time slot. A number of cooking shows have run for many seasons, especially when they are sponsored by local TV stations or by public broadcasting. Many of the more popular cooking shows have had flamboyant hosts whose unique personalities have made them into celebrities.

== Production ==
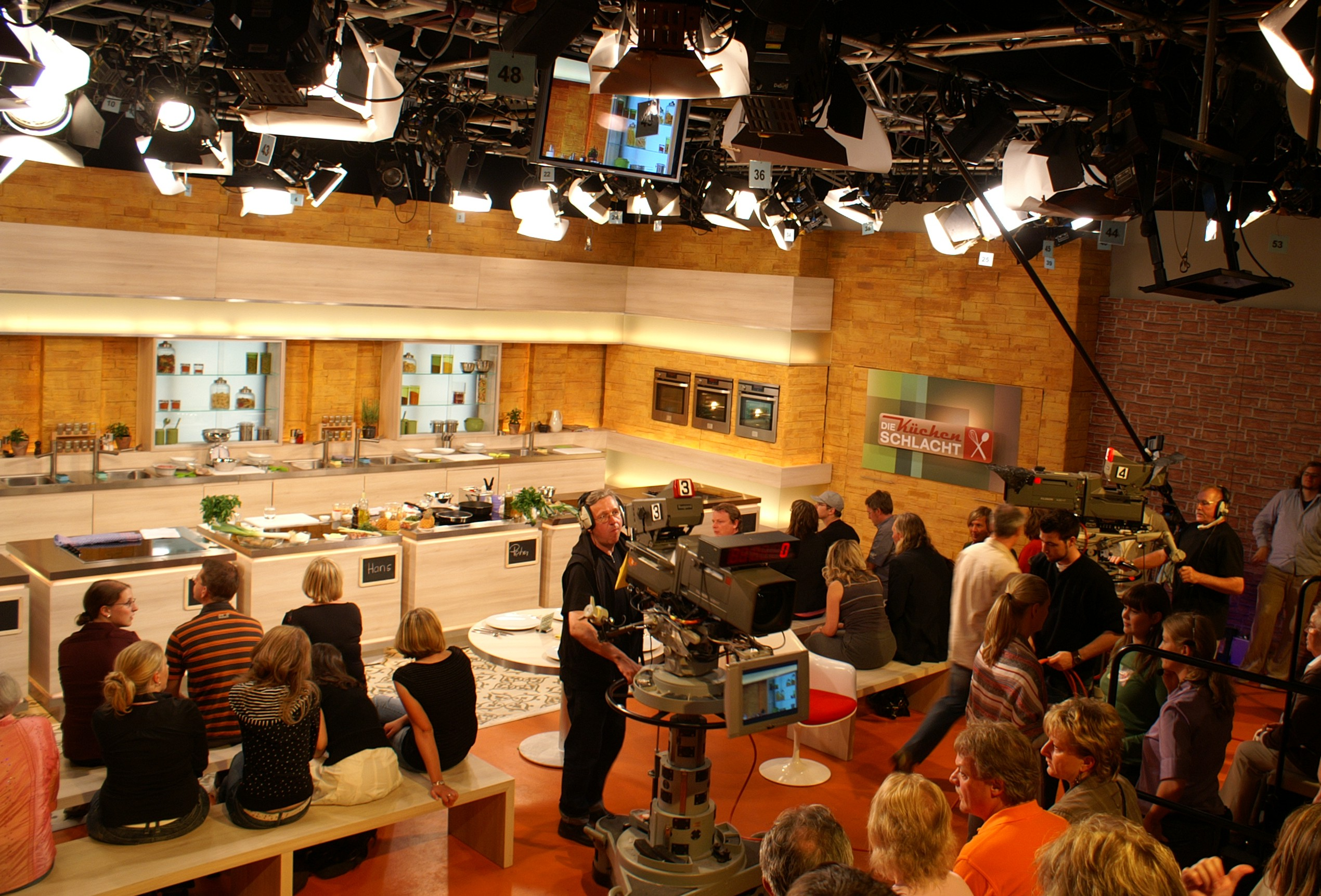
Studio set of the German cooking show Die Küchenschlacht ("The Kitchen Battle") in 2008

Due to time and production constraints, most, if not all, cooking shows employ filming shortcuts such as video editing, food modeling and photography, and prepared ingredients to speed up the cooking process and ensure a smooth and seamless production.

== Genres ==
Some cooking shows, such as Emeril Live, are oriented towards instructional material, and others, such as Trisha's Southern Kitchen, additionally focus on showcasing the personal lives of the hosts. Some, such as the Rachael Ray Show, blend the genre with a talk show format. There are also reality competitions within the genre such as Iron Chef, MasterChef, and Top Chef, in which contestants are given specific requirements and a time limit to prepare meals, which are then evaluated by a panel of judges, which can include celebrity chefs and other notable personalities. Travel cooking shows such as Gordon Ramsay: Uncharted and Salt Fat Acid Heat explore the culinary experiences of host chefs in various destinations. Chopped and Diners, Drive-Ins and Dives are examples of reality cooking shows, and Chefs A' Field and Chef's Table represent some of the documentary cooking shows.

== History ==
Until the 1940s, most cooking shows were performed on the radio. The first radio cooking show in the United States, The Betty Crocker Cooking School of the Air, debuted in 1924 and featured the fictional character Betty Crocker, voiced by Agnes White Tizard.

=== United Kingdom ===
One of the first television cooking shows, Cook's Night Out, aired on the BBC on 21 January 1937. Marcel Boulestin, who became famous in the English-speaking world for his cookery books on French cuisine, demonstrated the preparation of an omelet as part of the 15-minute program. Cookery, which was hosted by Philip Harben and aired from 1946 to 1951, is considered by Guinness World Records to be the first cooking show on television. On the show's debut, Harben demonstrated the preparation of lobster vols-au-vents.

=== United States ===
In 1940, Sunday Evening Supper was produced by Edward Padula for the NBC station W2XBS. I Love to Eat was a live television series hosted by James Beard that aired on NBC from 1946 to 1947. In 1963, The French Chef, one of the first cooking shows in the United States, was launched, and it was hosted by Julia Child, co-author of the cookbook Mastering the Art of French Cooking. In 1973, the cooking show Frugal Gourmet was launched on KTPS-TV, and was hosted by Jeff Smith, a chef from Seattle. In 1993, Food Network launched as a cable channel devoted primarily to cooking shows and other programming relating to food.

=== Australia ===
The Chef Presents, one of the first cooking shows in Australia, ran from 1957 to 1959 and was hosted by Willi Koeppen. The Jean Bowring Show, a cooking show aimed at women, aired from 1957 to 1960.

=== Brazil ===
The first cooking show on Brazilian television, Veja como se cozinha (English: "Watch How It's Cooked"), first aired from 1951 to 1958 with Marialice Prestes as its host, and then again from 1961 to 1963 featuring host Ofélia Anunciato. Helena Sangirardi hosted Sirva-se de bons pratos (English: "Help Yourself to Good Dishes") in 1956 and A Alegria de Cozinhar (English: "The Joy of Cooking") in 1957. Cozinha Maravilhosa da Ofélia (English: "Ofélia's Wonderful Cuisine") was hosted by Ofélia Anunciato and aired from 1968 to 1998, becoming the longest-running Brazilian cooking show.

=== France ===
In 1953, Jean d'Arcy, a French television director, was inspired by a cooking show in West Germany and brought the idea to France, resulting in the debut of the show Les Recettes de M. X (English: "The Recipes of Mr. X"). Hosted by comedian Georges Adet, it was the first cooking show to air in France, starting in 1953 and ending a year later. Art et magie de la cuisine (English: "Art and Magic of the Kitchen"), hosted by chef Raymond Oliver, was another one of the first cooking shows to air in France, running from 1954 to 1967.

=== Germany ===
On 20 February 1953, Clemens Wilmenrod bittet zu Tisch (English: "Clemens Wilmenrod Invites You to the Table"), the first cooking show in then-West Germany, was broadcast, with television chef Clemens Wilmenrod presenting recipes for foods such as Rumtopf and Toast Hawaii.

=== Japan ===
In 1953, Mikaku no Shiori (Japanese: 味覚のしおり), one of the first cooking shows in Japan, was broadcast, with Hatsuko Kuroda presenting chicken salad.

=== New Zealand ===
Graham Kerr was one of the first celebrity chefs to appear on New Zealand television, when the medium was introduced to the country in 1960. Kerr was later followed by Alison Holst, Des Britten, and Hudson and Halls.

== Popular culture ==
Sue Ann Nivens, a character played by Betty White in The Mary Tyler Moore Show, is the host of WJM's The Happy Homemaker, a fictional cooking show. In the Family Guy episode "Pilling Them Softly", Quagmire starts his own cooking show called "Quagmire's Kitchen".

== See also ==
- List of cooking shows
- Food reality television
