= Hawaii (disambiguation) =

Hawaii is a US state, situated in the Pacific Ocean, and Polynesia.

Hawaii may also refer to:

== Places ==
=== Astronomical ===
- 48575 Hawaii, an asteroid

=== Geographical ===
- Hawaiian Islands, the archipelago
- Hawaii (island), the largest island in the Hawaiian Islands
- Hawaii County, Hawaii, coextensive with the Island of Hawaii
- Hawaii, California, former name of Haiwee, California
- Cape Hawaii, Wrangel Island
- Hawaii 2, a private island in Maine, United States

=== Historical ===
- Ancient Hawaii
- Kingdom of Hawaii
- Republic of Hawaii
- Territory of Hawaii
- Havai'i, an older name for the island of Raʻiātea

== Art, entertainment, and media ==
=== Film ===
- Hawaii (1966 film), a 1966 film adaptation of Michener's 1959 book
- Hawaii (2013 film), a 2013 romantic drama film directed by Marco Berger

=== Literature ===
- Hawaii (novel), a 1959 novel by James Michener

=== Music ===
- Toast Hawaii (record label), a British record label

==== Groups ====
- Hawaii (band), a speed/power metal band

==== Albums ====
- Hawaii (The High Llamas album), 1996
- Hawaii (Pete Yorn album), 2022

==== Songs ====
- "Hawái" (song), a 2020 song by Maluma
- "Hawaii" (The Beach Boys song), a 1963 song by the Beach Boys off their Surfer Girl album
- "Hawaii" (Elmer Bernstein song), the theme song from the 1966 film of the same name.
- "Hawaii", a song by Mew on their 2009 album No More Stories...
- "Hawaii", a song by Neil Young on his album Hitchhiker recorded in 1976 and released in 2017
- "Hawaii", a song by Old Dominion on their 2021 album Time, Tequila & Therapy
- "Hawaii (Stay Awake)", a single off of Waterparks' 2016 album, Double Dare
- "Hawaii" a B-side by The Strokes from the single Juicebox

=== Television ===
- "Hawaii" (Modern Family), a 2010 episode of Modern Family
- Hawaii (TV series), a short-lived NBC TV series
- Hawaii Five-O (1968 TV series), a television police drama series, originally aired from 1968 to 1980
  - Hawaii Five-0 (2010 TV series), a 2010 television remake

== Education ==
- University of Hawaiʻi
  - University of Hawaiʻi at Mānoa, the main campus of the above university
    - Hawaii Rainbow Wahine, women's athletic teams of University of Hawaii at Manoa
    - Hawaii Rainbow Warriors, men's athletic teams of University of Hawaii at Manoa

== Other uses ==
- Hawaii (horse) (1964–1990), South African Thoroughbred racehorse
- USS Hawaii, either of two ships of that name in the U.S. Navy
- Toast Hawaii, a type of open ham and cheese sandwich
- Hawaii, code name of high-end AMD Radeon R9 GPU models 290/290X/390/390X (28 nm fab process).
- Pizza hawaii

== See also ==
- Hawai (disambiguation)
- Hawaiian (disambiguation)
- Hawaiki
