= Hawaiian style =

Hawaiian style may refer to:

- Hawaiian pizza
- Aloha shirt, also referred to as a Hawaiian shirt
- Hawaiian cuisine (disambiguation)

== See also ==
- Hawaiian (disambiguation)
