= Hawaiian =

Hawaiian may refer to:

- Native Hawaiians, the current term for the indigenous people of the Hawaiian Islands or their descendants
- Hawaii state residents, regardless of ancestry (only used outside of Hawaii)
- Hawaiian language, a Polynesian language originally spoken on the eight major islands of the Hawaiian archipelago

== Historic uses ==
- things and people of the Kingdom of Hawaii, during the period from 1795 to 1893
- things and people of the Republic of Hawaii, the short period between the overthrow of the monarchy and U.S. annexation
- things and people of the Territory of Hawaii, during the period the area was a U.S. territory from 1898 to 1959
- things and people of the Sandwich Islands, the name used for the Hawaiian Islands around the end of the 18th century

== Other uses ==
- Hawaiian Airlines, a commercial airline based in Hawaii
- Hawaiian pizza, a style of pizza topped with pineapple

== See also ==
- Hawaiians (disambiguation)
- Hawaiian cuisine (disambiguation)
- Hawaiian Islands
- Hawaiian kinship
