= Government of Hawaii (disambiguation) =

The Government of Hawaii is the governmental structure as established by the Constitution of Hawaii.

Government of Hawaii may also refer to:

- Provisional Government of Hawaii, proclaimed after the coup d'état on January 17, 1893

Government of Hawaii may also refer to the governments of:

- Ancient Hawaii
- Kingdom of Hawaii
- Republic of Hawaii
- Territory of Hawaii

== See also ==
- Hawaii (disambiguation)
