= Hawai =

Hawai may refer to:

== Places ==
- Hawai, Tottori, a town in Tottori Prefecture, Japan
- Hawai, India, the administrative headquarters of Anjaw District, in Arunachal Pradesh, India
- Hāwai, New Zealand
- Hawai River, New Zealand
- A misspelling of Hawaii

== Other uses ==
- "Hawái" (song), a 2020 song by Maluma

== See also ==
- Hawaii (disambiguation)
  - Hawaii, 50th state of the United States
- Havai'i, an older name for the island of Raiatea
- Huawei, a Chinese multinational technology company
