= Mirko Szewczuk =

German cartoonist

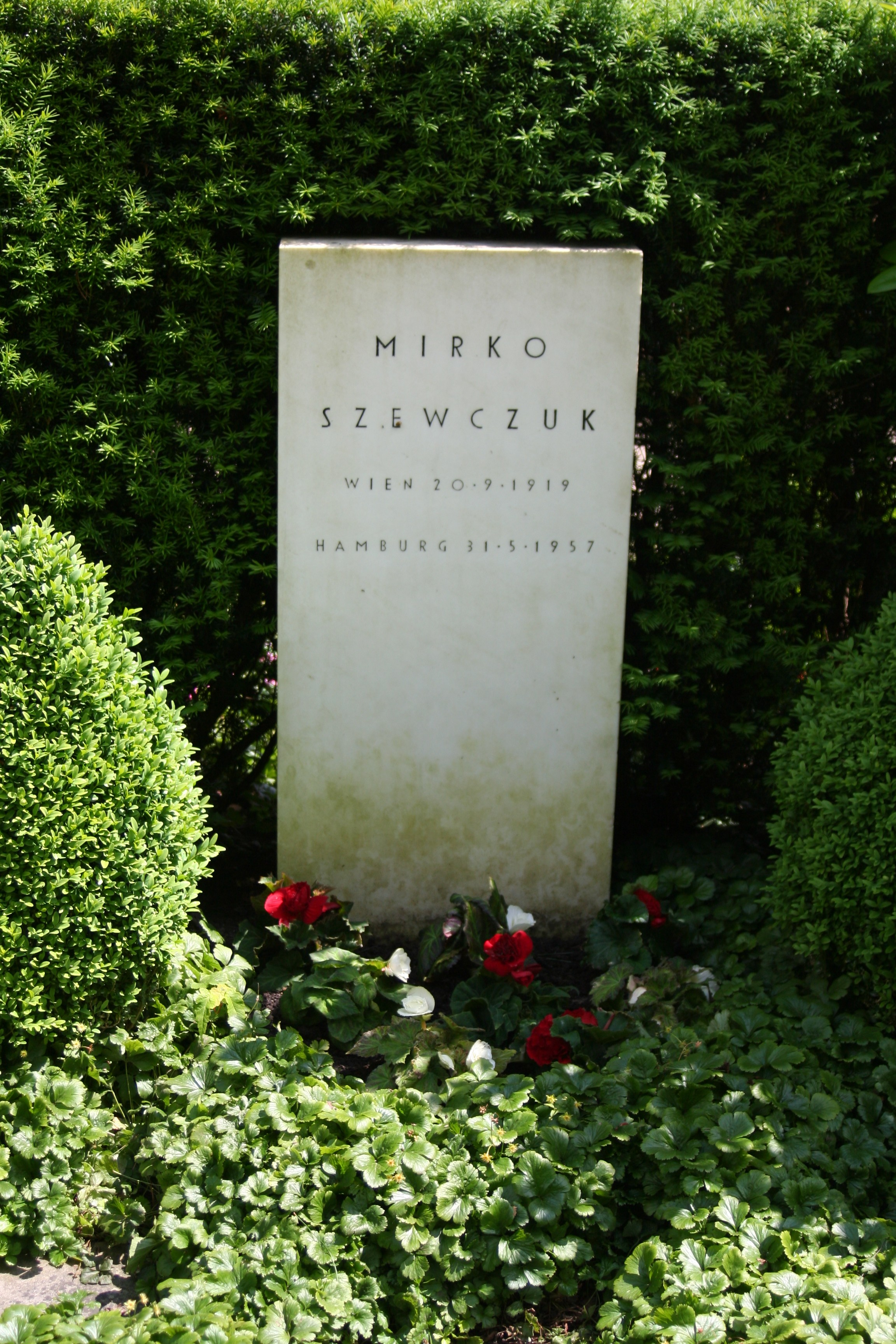
Gravestone of Mirko Szewczuk

Mirko Szewczuk (born Volodymyr Szewczuk; 20 September 1919 in Vienna; died 31 May 1957 in Hamburg, Germany) was a German cartoonist of Austrian-Ukrainian origin.

Szewczuk was born in 1919 in Vienna, Austria. From 1926-1938, he attended the elementary school and the Realgymnasium in Vienna. In 1939, at the age of 20, he became a soldier and remained so until the end of the Second World War.

In 1941, he received an education as a draughtsman at a press propaganda company of the Wehrmacht. He was employed in 1942 as a press cartoonist for the caricature agency Die Politische Zeichnung - Interpress.

Between 1946-49, he studied at the National Arts School of Hamburg and was a cartoonist for the weekly German newspaper "Die Zeit". He then transferred to the daily newspaper Die Welt, where he worked until his death in Hamburg in 1957.
