= Rumtopf =

Canned fruits and berries in rum

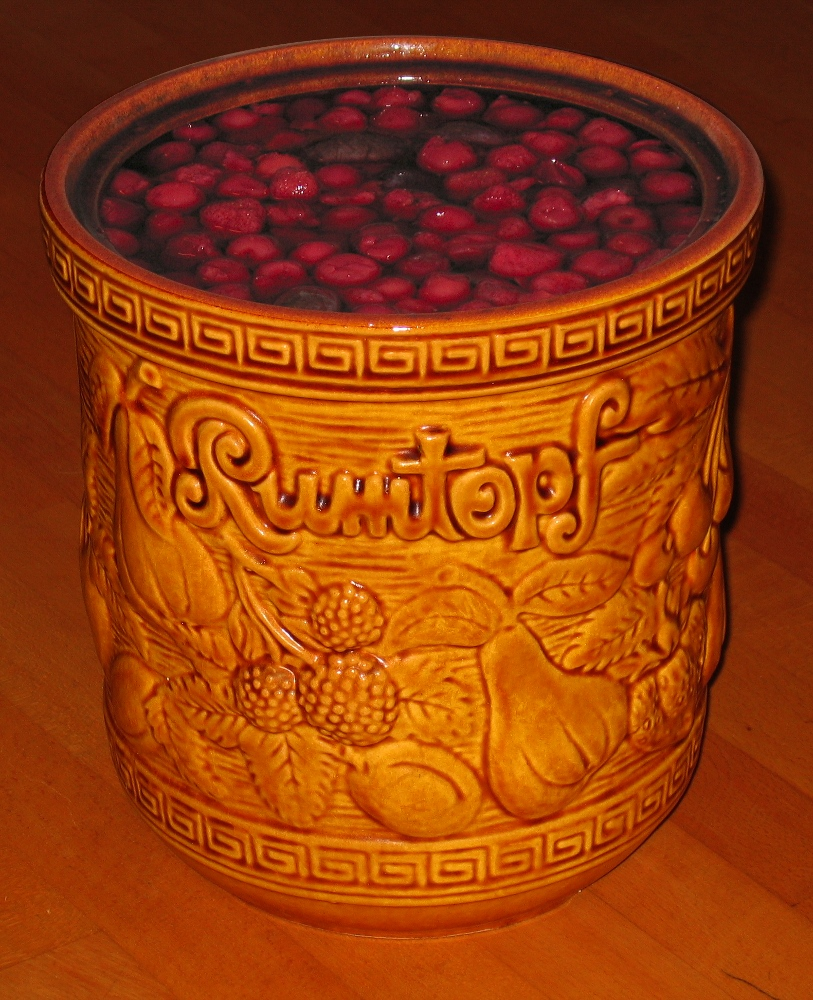
- Course: Dessert
- Place of origin: Austria, Germany and Denmark
- Main ingredients: Fruit, rum, sugar

Rumtopf (Danish: Romkrukke), which literally means rum pot, is an Austrian, German and Danish dessert of mixed fruit and alcohol traditionally eaten around Christmas. It is also made in northern Italy, especially in the valleys of Trentino, where it became traditional in Valsugana.

A mixture of various kinds of fruit, high-strength rum (commonly Austrian Stroh) and sugar is filled into a large stoneware pot (the eponymous rum pot). The pots themselves are often made specifically for the creation of rumtopf and can be quite elaborate in their decoration. The mixture is then matured for several months until the fruit is very soft and completely saturated with rum. Suitable fruit includes berries, cherries, plums and apricots. Not all fruits are appropriate for Rumtopf, and the overproof rum should be of only 100–110 proof (50–55% alcohol by volume), which is not commonly available at retail in all regions, but can be prepared by blending commercially available 151 or 160 proof rums with more common 80 proof brands.

Traditionally, the pot is set up in a cool and dark place in spring, and different kinds of ripe fruit are added to it over the months as they come into season. Different fruits are typically added at different times. The end product is fully preserved to be eaten in winter, after the Rumtopf has matured.

Rumtopf is traditionally eaten as a compote and served as a topping on poundcake, waffles, and Bratapfel (baked apples), and is also served over ice cream. Once immensely popular to be made at home, Rumtopf had somewhat fallen out of fashion by the 21st century because of the time and commitment needed to make the dessert. Rumtopf is one of the dishes the German television cook Clemens Wilmenrod helped to popularize .

== See also ==
- List of dessert sauces
- List of German desserts
