= N-Nitrosamides =

Basic structure with blue emphasized functional group	N-Nitrosamide derivates with blue emphasized functional group
N-Nitrosamides	N-Nitrosocarbamates N-Nitrosoureas N-Nitrosoguanidine
R^{1}-R^{3} are hydrogen atoms or organic residues

Nitrosamides are chemical compounds that contain the chemical structure R^{1}C(=X)N(–R^{2})–N=O, that is, a nitroso group bonded to the nitrogen of an amide or similar functional group. Specific classes include the N-nitrosamides, N-nitrosoureas, N-nitrosoguanidines, and N-nitrosocarbamates. Nitrosamides are usually chemically reactive, metabolically unstable, and often carcinogenic; however, in contrast to the N-nitrosamines, N-nitrosamides are not generally contaminants found in food.

== Use ==
Various chloroethylnitrosoureas (such as N, N'-bis (2-chloroethyl)nitrosourea, BCNU) have obtained a medical use in the field of malignant tumors. It is hypothesized that the efficacy against cancer cells is based on the alkylability of guanine cytosine centers in the sequences of the genetic material, especially the oncogenes.

== Synthesis ==
N-Nitrosamides can be prepared starting from N-monosubstituted carboxamides and the nitrosyl cation (which results from the nitrous cation in the presence of strong acids from the nitrous acid), here exemplified for N-methylacetamide (1). The carboxamide reacts in a nucleophilic attack at the nitrosyl cation. After the elimination of a proton, an N-nitrosamide (2) is formed from the resulting cation:

Synthese eines N-Nitrosamids ausgehend von N-Methylacetamid

== Toxicity ==
The genotoxic effect of the N-nitroso compounds can be attributed to the formation of reactive electrophilic species in the metabolism. The spontaneous decomposition of N-nitroso-ureas in the aqueous medium of the metabolism, here for example of 1-methylnitrosourea (3), produces diazonium or carbenium ions, respectively. The decomposition occurs into isocyanic acid and methyldiazohydroxide. The rearrangement to the diazonium ion and the subsequent elimination of nitrogen results in a carbenium ion (4), which can alkylate nucleophilic intersections of the DNA.

Zerfall eines N-Nitrosoharnstoffs zu einem alkylierenden Intermediat

In the organism, the decomposition of N-nitroso ureas with a higher degree of substitution can proceed. An alternative possible formation of diazonium and carbenium ions is through the enzymatic reaction of nitrosamines.

Typical accompanying symptoms during the medical cancer treatment via N-nitroso ureas are the impairment of bone marrow (damage of the stem cell compartment), lymphatic tissue and the gastrointestinal tract.
