= Hawaiians (disambiguation) =

Hawaiians are the indigenous people of the Hawaiian Islands.

Hawaiians or The Hawaiians may also refer to:

- The Hawaiians (WFL), a football team in the World Football League from 1974 to 1975
- The Hawaiians (film), a 1970 American historical film
