= Sandwich Islands (disambiguation) =

Sandwich Islands was the name given to the Hawaiian Islands by James Cook in 1778.

Sandwich Islands or Sandwich Island may also refer to:

- Efate, the most populous island in the Republic of Vanuatu, named Sandwich Island by Cook
- Manuae (Cook Islands), an uninhabited atoll in the Cook Islands, named Sandwich Island by Cook
- South Sandwich Islands, uninhabited volcanic islands in the South Atlantic Ocean, named Sandwich Land by Cook

== Other uses ==
- Sandwich Island sleeper, a species of fish endemic to the Hawaiian Islands
- South Georgia and the South Sandwich Islands, part of the British territory of South Georgia and the South Sandwich Islands
- Sandwich Islets, south of Bahía Cook, Chile
