= Ofélia Ramos Anunciato =

Brazilian chef (1924–1998)

- Born: December 27, 1924; Itatiba, São Paulo, Brazil
- Died: October 26, 1998 (aged 73); São Paulo, Brazil

Ofélia Ramos Anunciato or Ofélia Anunciato (December 27, 1924 – October 26, 1998) was a well-known Brazilian chef. She hosted cooking shows on TV, such as A cozinha Maravilhosa de Ofélia. She began her career as a celebrity chef by publishing recipes in 1958 in the newspapers A Tribuna (Santos, São Paulo) and A Gazeta (also in São Paulo). Over the course of her career she published several cookbooks, including A cozinha brasileira de Ofélia, and her recipes were later made available to English-speaking readers in the translated volume Ofélia, A Taste of Brazil.
