= Clemens Wilmenrod =

German television cook

- Born: Karl Clemens Hahn; July 24, 1906; Willmenrod, Germany
- Died: April 12, 1967 (aged 60); Munich, Germany
- Culinary career
- Television show
- Clemens Wilmenrod bittet zu Tisch - (1953-1964)

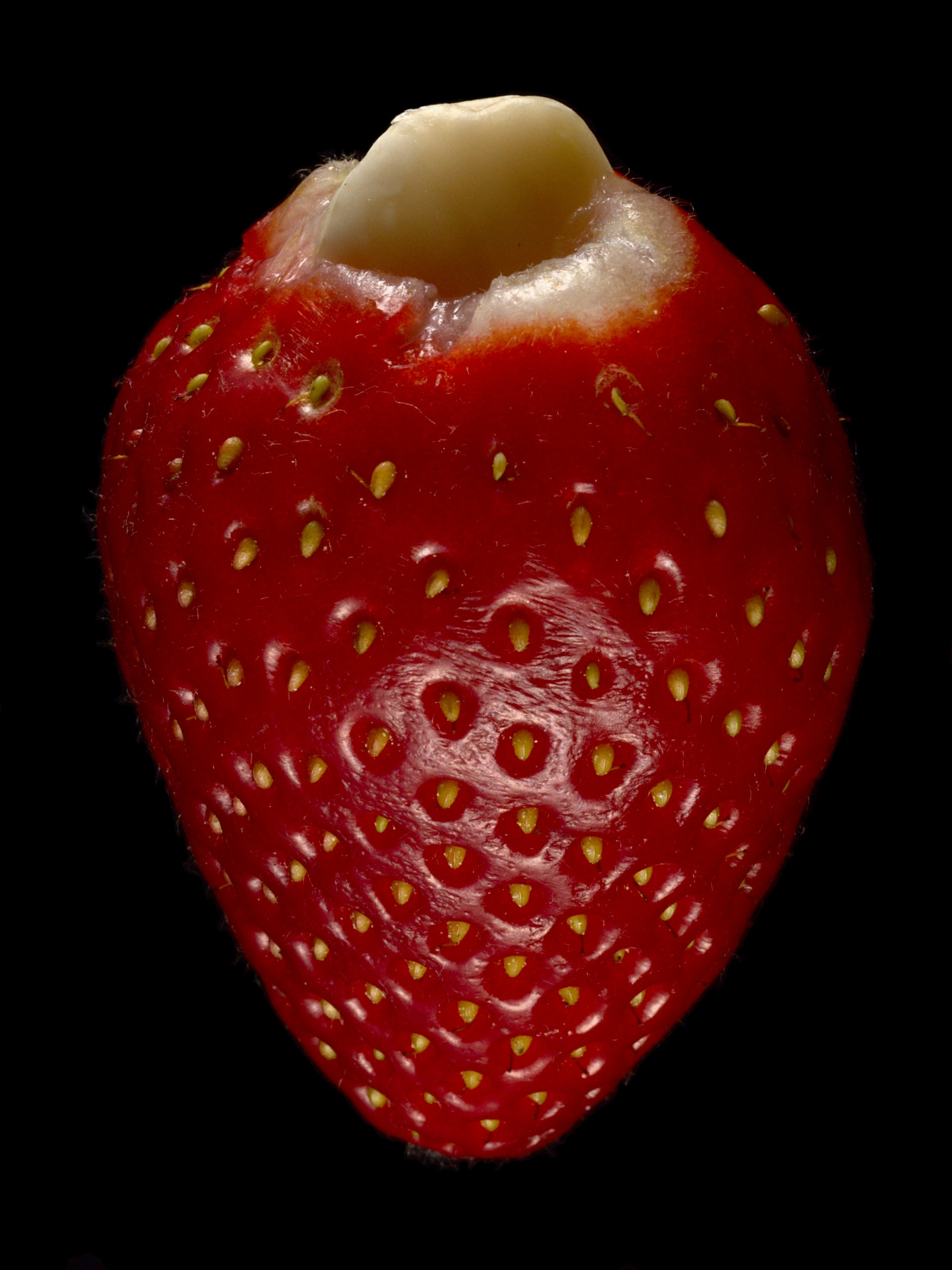
Stuffed Strawberry, one of Wilmenrod's signature dishes

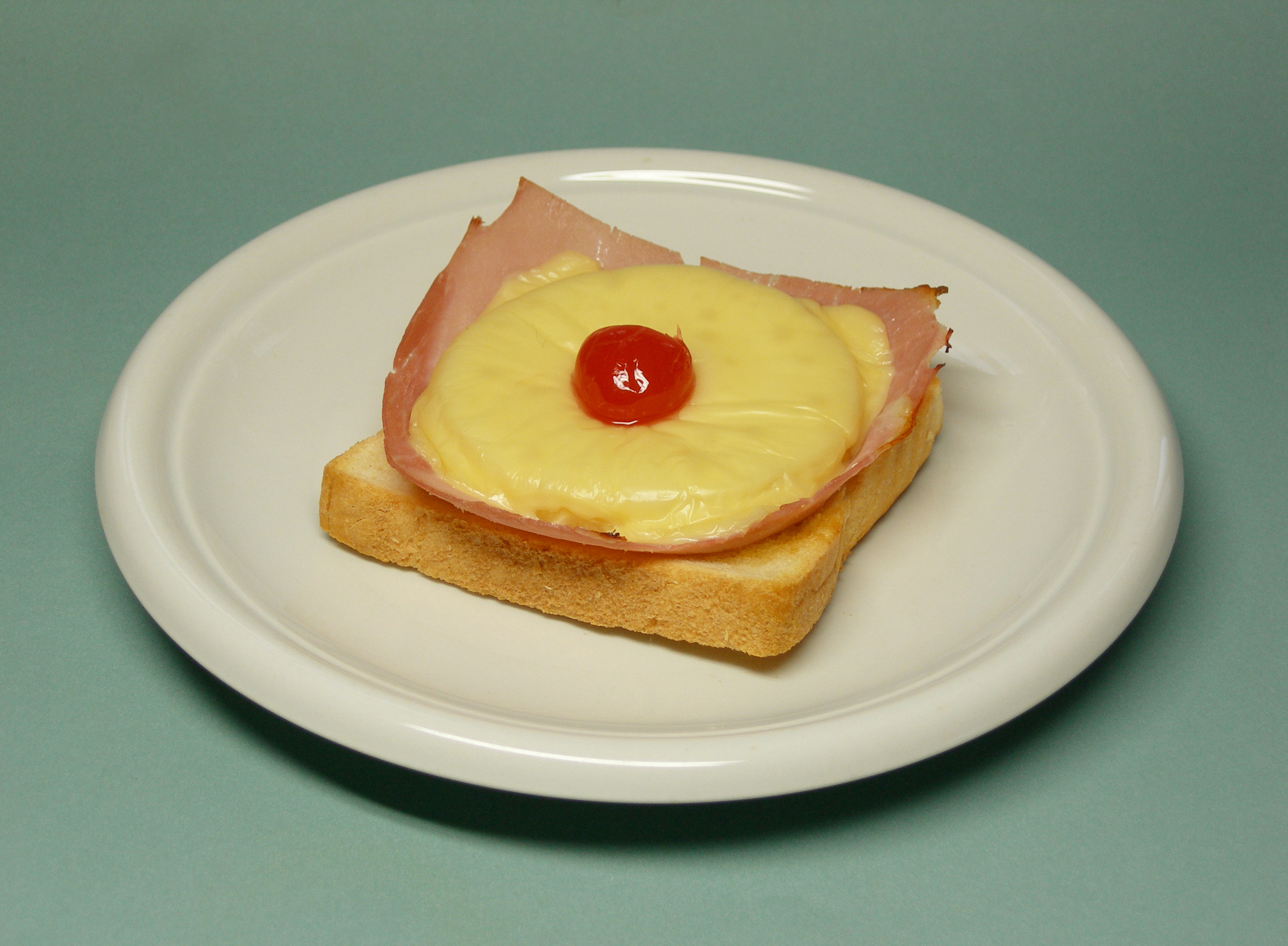
Toast Hawaii

Clemens Wilmenrod (July 24, 1906 – April 12, 1967) was the first German television cook. His pseudonym was derived from the municipality Willmenrod in the Westerwald region, where he was born as Carl Clemens Hahn. Wilmenrod is considered the inventor of Toast Hawaii, "Arabian Horseman's Delight" (mincemeat with onions) and "stuffed strawberry" (strawberry stuffed with an almond). He is also credited with making Rumtopf popular in Southern and Western Germany, and with introducing turkey as a typical Christmas dinner.

Wilmenrod was not a trained chef, but had studied as an actor and had an acting career before becoming the star of his television program.

From February 20, 1953, to May 16, 1964, he starred in Bitte in zehn Minuten zu Tisch on WDR television, assisted by his wife Erika, and provided his audience with suggestions for creative cooking in 185 broadcasts. Wilmenrod, also known as "Don Clemente", wore a trademark apron with a caricature by Mirko Szewczuk.

The dishes presented were characterized by the general scarcity of the post-war period, and Wilmenrod was not ashamed to use canned vegetables, instant sauces, and even ketchup. While this may not measure up to the current state of the culinary art, he had a great influence on the post-war generation in Germany: his programmes and cookbooks were blockbusters, and when he presented a cod recipe, for instance, cod would be sold out for weeks.

In one infamous incident, after being accused by a viewer of not having invented the "filled strawberry" himself, Wilmenrod put a long cook's knife against his chest and swore to kill himself if a single viewer who had previously eaten filled strawberry were to call.

He committed suicide in 1967 in a hospital in Munich after being diagnosed with stomach cancer.

His life has been made into the made-for-TV movie Es liegt mir auf der Zunge where he was portrayed by Jan Josef Liefers in 2009.
