= Curing salt =

Salt used in food preservation

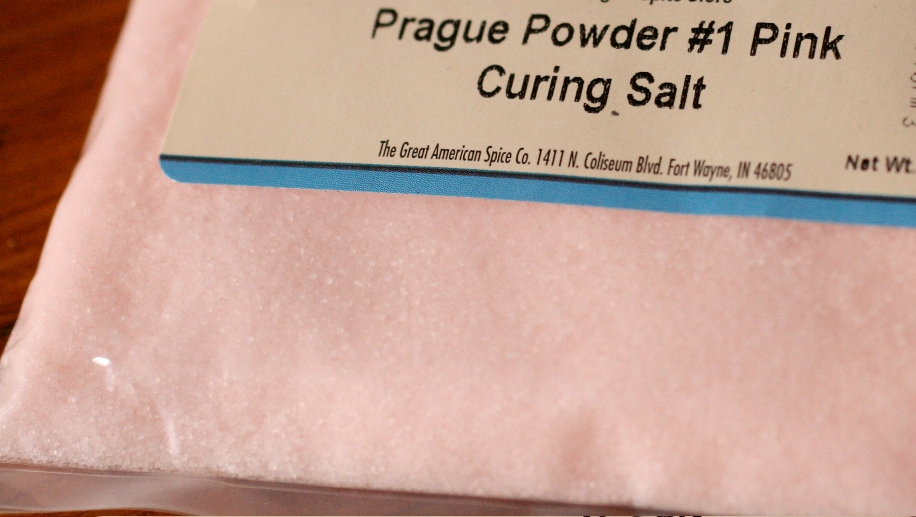
Curing salt

Curing salt is used in meat processing to generate a pinkish shade and to extend shelf life. It is both a color agent and a means to facilitate food preservation as it prevents or slows spoilage by bacteria or fungi. Curing salts are generally a mixture of sodium chloride (table salt) and sodium nitrite, and are used for pickling meats as part of the process to make sausage or cured meat such as ham, bacon, pastrami, corned beef, etc. Though it has been suggested that the reason for using nitrite-containing curing salt is to prevent botulism, a 2018 study by the British Meat Producers Association determined that legally permitted levels of nitrite have no effect on the growth of the Clostridium botulinum bacteria that causes botulism, in line with the UK's Advisory Committee on the Microbiological Safety of Food opinion that nitrites are not required to prevent C. botulinum growth and extend shelf life. (see also Sodium Nitrite: Inhibition of microbial growth).

Many curing salts also contain red dye that makes them pink to prevent them from being confused with common table salt. Thus curing salt is sometimes referred to as "pink salt". Curing salts are not to be confused with Himalayan pink salt, a halite which is 97–99% sodium chloride (table salt) with trace elements that give it a pink color.

== Types ==
There are many types of curing salts often specific to a country or region.

=== Prague Powder #1 ===
One of the most common curing salts. It is also called Insta Cure #1 or Pink curing salt #1. It contains 6.25% sodium nitrite and 93.75% table salt. It is recommended for meats that require short cures and will be cooked and eaten relatively quickly. Sodium nitrite provides the characteristic flavor and color associated with curing.

=== Prague Powder #2 ===
Also called Pink curing salt #2. It contains 6.25% sodium nitrite, 4% sodium nitrate, and 89.75% table salt. The sodium nitrate found in Prague powder #2 gradually breaks down over time into sodium nitrite, and by the time a dry cured sausage is ready to be eaten, no sodium nitrate should be left. For this reason it is recommended for meats that require long (weeks to months) cures, like hard salami and country ham.

=== Saltpetre ===
Another name for potassium nitrate (KNO_{3}), saltpetre, also called saltpeter or nitrate of potash, has been a common ingredient of some types of salted meat for centuries but its use has been mostly discontinued due to inconsistent results compared to nitrite compounds (KNO_{2}, NaNO_{2}, NNaNO_{2}, etc.) Even so, saltpetre is still used in some food applications, such as some charcuterie products. It should not be confused with Chile saltpetre or Peru saltpetre, which is sodium nitrate (NaNO_{3}).

== See also ==
- Curing (food preservation) – Food preservation and flavouring processes based on drawing moisture out of the food by osmosis
- Brining – Food processing by treating with brine or salt
- Bacon – Type of salt-cured pork
- Charcuterie – Branch of cooking of prepared meat products, primarily from pork
- Cured fish – Fish subjected to fermentation, pickling or smoking
- List of dried foods
- Salt – Mineral composed of sodium chloride
- Sausage making – Sausage production processes
- Biltong – Form of dried, cured meat from southern Africa
