= USS Hawaii =

USS Hawaii may refer to:

- USS Hawaii (CB-3), the third Alaska-class cruiser, was launched, but never commissioned
- USS Hawaii (SSN-776), the third Virginia-class submarine, was commissioned 5 May 2007
