= Toast Hawaii =

German open-face sandwich

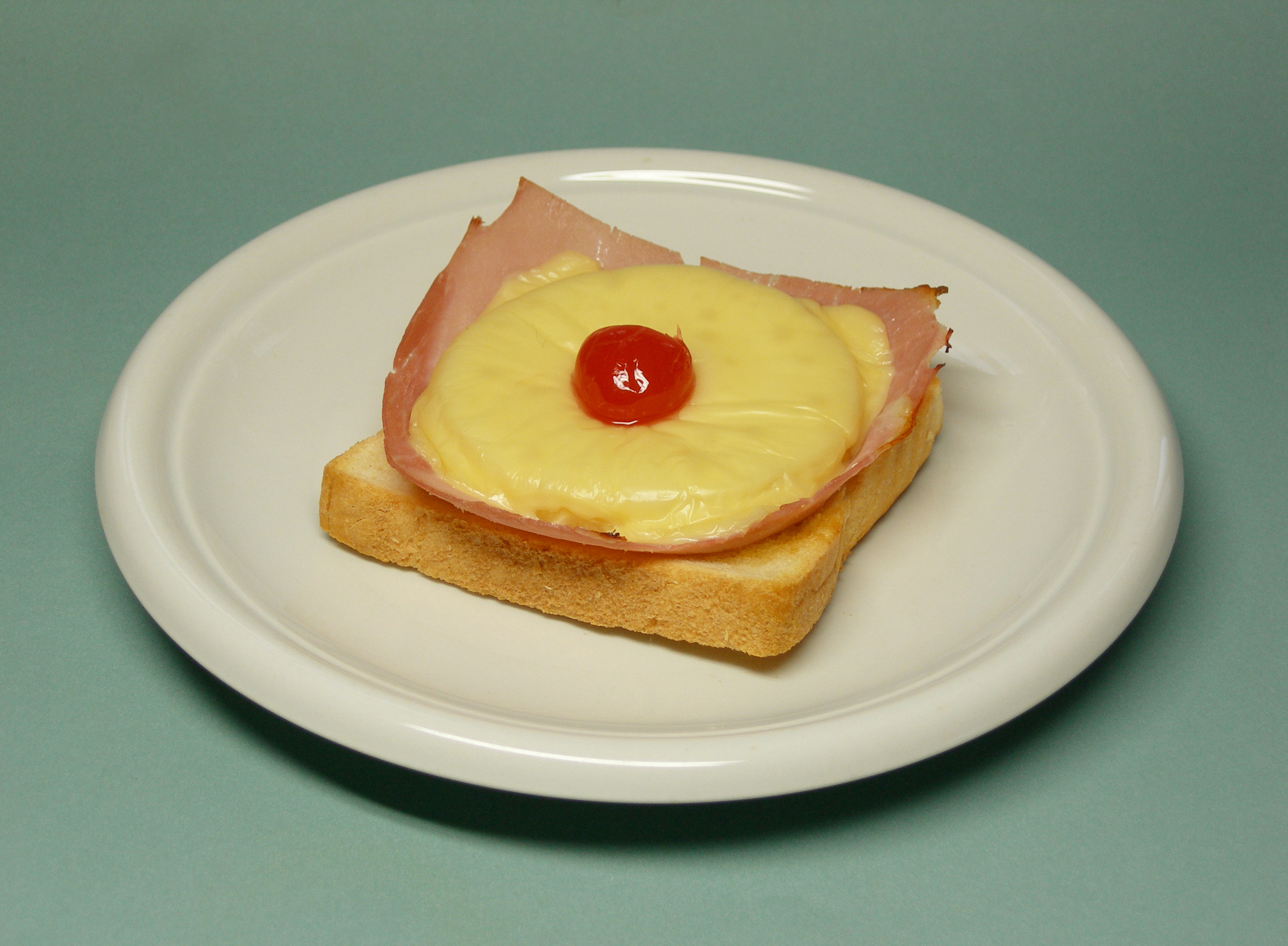
- Alternative names: Hawaiian Toast
- Type: Open sandwich
- Course: Lunch or Dinner
- Place of origin: Germany
- Created by: Clemens Wilmenrod
- Main ingredients: Toast, ham, pineapple, maraschino cherry, cheese

Toast Hawaii is an open sandwich consisting of a slice of toast with ham and cheese, and a maraschino cherry in the center of a pineapple slice, baked so that the cheese starts to melt. It was made popular by the West German TV cook Clemens Wilmenrod in the 1950s. It has been speculated that the recipe was adapted from the "Grilled Spamwich" found in a 1939 Spam cookbook and brought to West Germany by American G.I.s. With Spam not being available in Germany's grocery stores at the time, Wilmenrod would have replaced it with a slice of cooked ham.

== Preparation ==
Lightly toasted bread is buttered, covered with a slice of cooked or raw ham, pineapple, and cheese (usually processed cheese), then baked. It is also common to place a maraschino cherry, cranberries, or other similar fruit on the finished toast, or to season it with sweet paprika powder. Toast Hawaii is similar to other purportedly "Hawaiian-style" dishes that are prepared with pineapple and cheese, such as Hawaiian pizza or Hawaiian steak.

== History ==
The invention of toast Hawaii is generally credited to TV chef Clemens Wilmenrod, who first introduced it in West Germany in 1955. However, it has been suggested that Wilmenrod took the recipe from his competitor and teacher Hans Karl Adam.

According to historian Petra Foede, it may be a variant of the "Grilled Spamwich" once common in the United States, slightly adapted to German conditions. The original recipe uses Spam instead of boiled ham and grated cheese instead of a slice; otherwise, there is no difference between recipes. The "Grilled Spamwich" recipe was first published in 1939 in a cookbook by Spam manufacturer Hormel. Unlike boiled ham, however, Spam was unavailable in German grocery stores. Publicist Jürgen Ahrens sees the French croque monsieur as a precursor to Toast Hawaii.

A large number of variations later emerged; the TV chef Tim Mälzer presented a "modern" variant in the 2010s featuring brown bread, Serrano ham, and Manchego cheese.

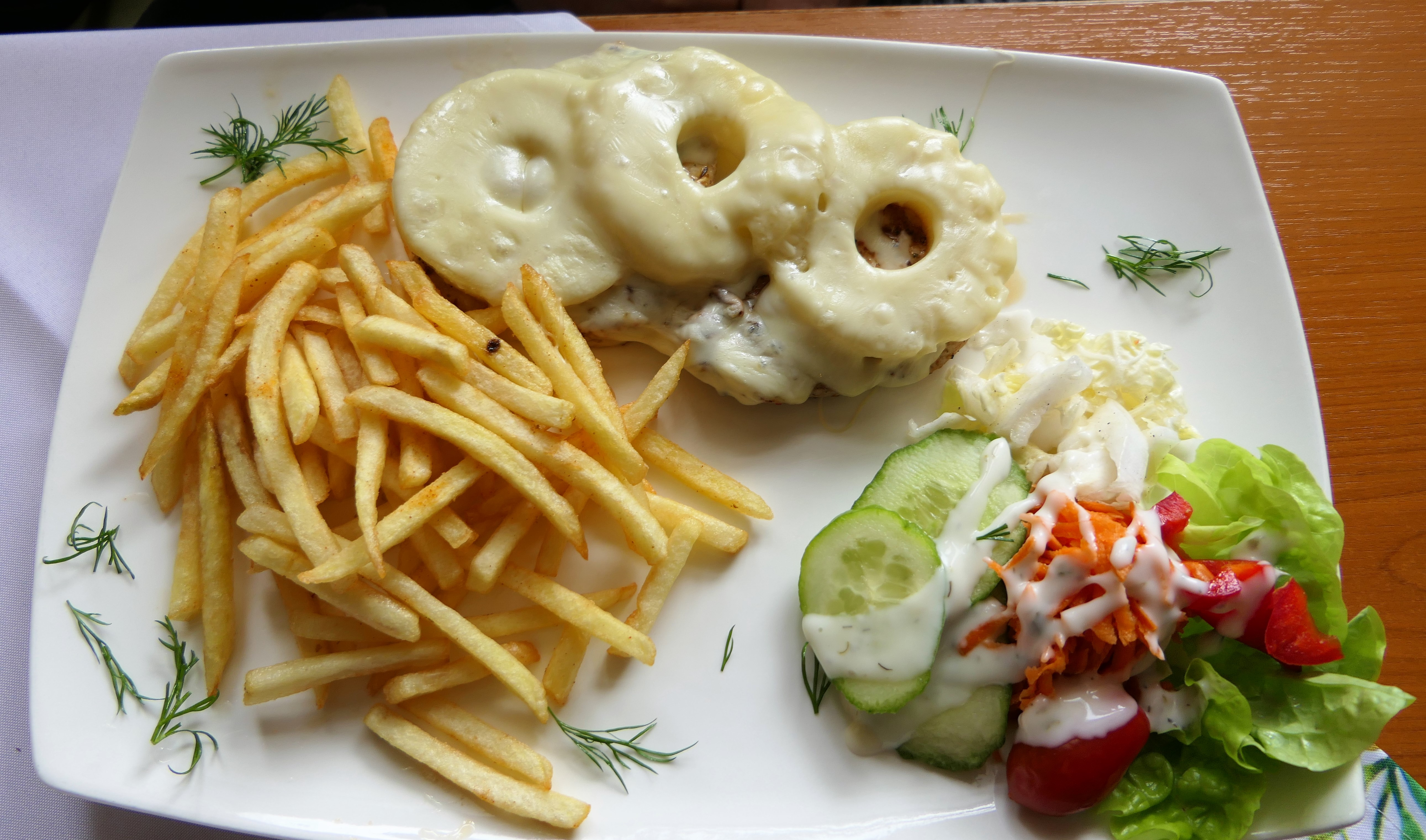
Steak Hawaiian

== Health concerns ==
Because of the combination of ingredients, there is the concern that toast Hawaii and similarly composed dishes have the potential to form carcinogenic nitrosamines due to the combination of nitrates in the ham curing salt and the amino acids in the cheese in the acidic environment of the pineapple. However, investigations by the Food Technology department at the Berliner Hochschule für Technik did not reveal any increased levels of nitrosamines.

== Distribution ==
Toast Hawaii was a typical meal for West German families up until the 1970s and was a popular dish in pubs, party rooms, and bowling alleys in the 1980s. However, by 2015 the more commonly consumed pineapple-centric dish in Germany was Hawaiian pizza; unlike Hawaiian pizza, which is distributed globally, Toast Hawaii has remained a purely German phenomenon. About ten years after its introduction, Hawaiian toast also found its way into the cuisine of East Germany, but was limited to being served in restaurants, as pineapples were a scarce and expensive good in East Germany. In East German home kitchens, versions of Karlsbader Schnitte were more popular, using the more commonly available Jagdwurst or meatloaf and omitting the pineapple.

In Austria, Toast Hawaii was seen as one of the markers of Americanization in the 1950s, but the Hawaii schnitzel even more so. The dish has also been available in Switzerland since the 1950s; the Zurich-Kloten Airport restaurant was one of the first to serve Hawaiian toast in Switzerland around 1960 and was one of the top ten most Googled recipes in 2013.

== Reception ==
Toast Hawaii is considered a piece of German cultural history. On the 60th anniversary of its creation, the Süddeutsche Zeitung wrote that few other subjects had been discussed as passionately as the polarizing opinions on Toast Hawaii. Toast Hawaii brought a touch of the exotic into everyday life and was thus part of the conspicuous consumption of the post-war period in Germany. According to the journalist Gudrun Rothaug, the dish bundled the desires of an entire generation onto a few square centimeters of wheat bread, and according to historian Petra Foede, the dish also represents moving away from traditional meals primarily intended to be stomach-fillers (such as stew or dumplings). Ulrich Herbert points out the eating habits of the 1950s were not shaped by "modern" dishes like this one, but rather by bread, sausage, potatoes, and meat.

Media scientist Gerd Hallenberger pointed out that the exotic fruit involved in the dish could also be interpreted as compensation for the continuing food shortage in the post-war kitchen and inability to afford vacations to distant countries. Toast Hawaii brought the initially internationally isolated German citizens a piece of new normality and connection to the culinary world culture.

According to Josef Joffe, the dish is often associated with philistinism, but stands for a milestone towards modernity. Toast Hawaii also found its way into popular culture; Loriot satirically alluded to it with his "Kalbshaxe Florida", as did Gerhard Polt with his "Leberkäs Hawaii" (both fictional). There is a musical that shares its name, and the 2009 NDR television film Es liegt mir auf der Zunge about its creator also covered its creation. Music producer Alexander Marcus created the Hawaii Toast song, in which he sings about the food; this attracted media attention in 2014 and the song was viewed over seven million times on YouTube.

== In popular culture ==
- In the German TV show Kleo (Season 2, Episode 3), set in the early 1990s, a West German character asks "Why are you eating toast Hawaii for breakfast?", to which the East German character answers "It's a Carlsbad slice".
- In the German TV show Dark, (Season 2, Episode 2, “Dark Matter”) in a scene set in 1987, a woman offers a child toast Hawaii as a comfort food.

== See also ==
- Hawaiian pizza
- List of bread dishes
- List of toast dishes
- List of sandwiches
