= Hawaiian pizza =

Canadian pizza topped with pineapple

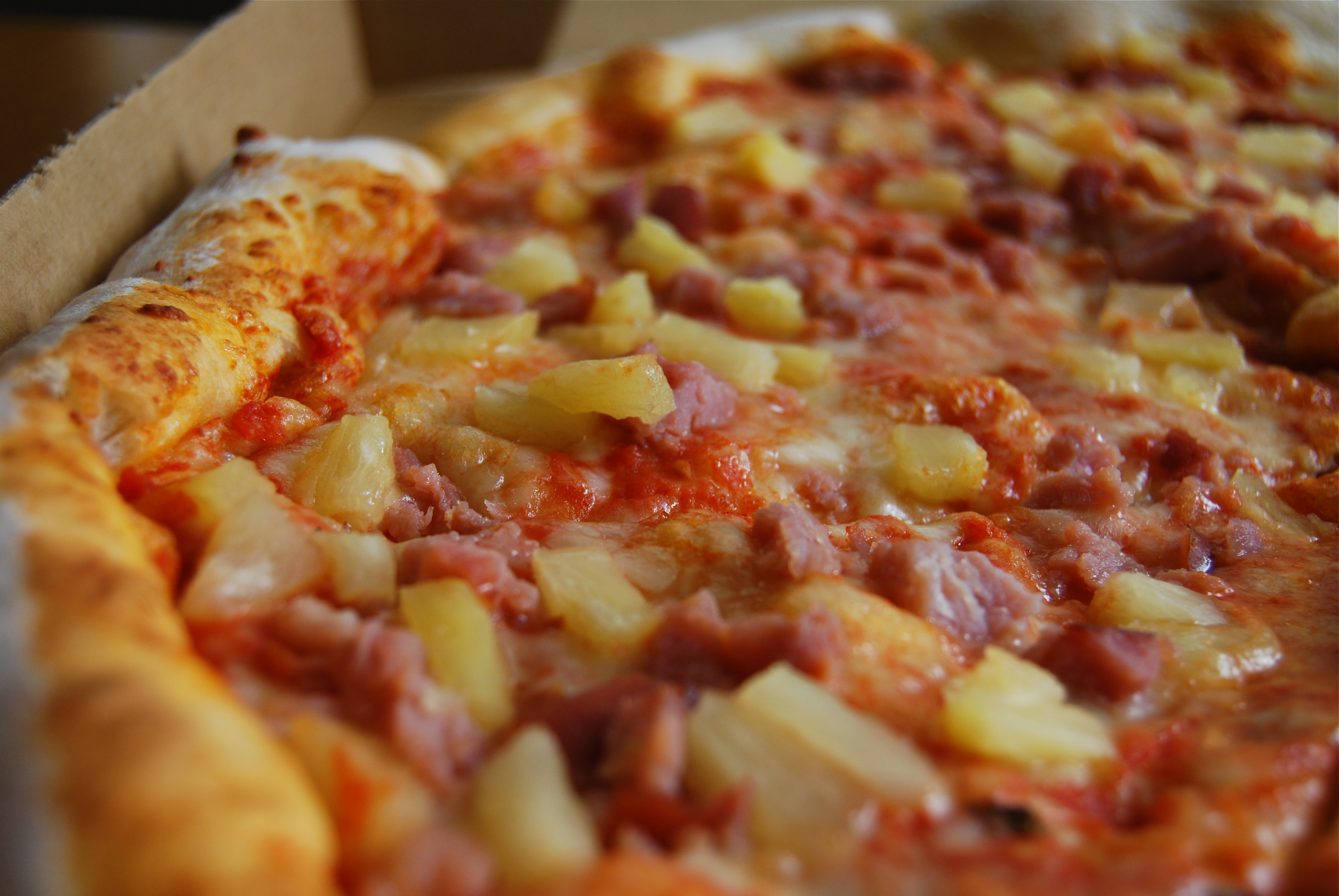
- Type: Pizza
- Place of origin: Canada
- Main ingredients: Pineapple, tomato sauce, mozzarella, ham or bacon

Hawaiian pizza is a pizza invented in Canada, topped with pineapple, tomato sauce, mozzarella cheese, and either ham or bacon.

== History ==
Sam Panopoulos, a Greek-born Canadian, is credited with creating the first Hawaiian pizza at the Satellite Restaurant in Chatham (now Chatham-Kent), Ontario, Canada, in 1962. Inspired in part by his experience preparing Canadian Chinese dishes which commonly mix sweet and sour flavors, Panopoulos experimented with adding pineapple, ham, bacon, and other toppings. These additions were not initially very popular.

The addition of pineapple to the traditional mix of tomato sauce and cheese, along with either ham or bacon, later became popular locally and eventually became a staple offering of pizzerias on a global scale. The name of this creation was not directly inspired by the U.S. state of Hawaii at all; Panopoulos chose the name Hawaiian due to using canned pineapple from Hawaiian Pineapple Company.

In Germany, Hawaiian pizza is thought to be a variation of the ham, pineapple and cheese-topped toast Hawaii, originally introduced by Germany's first TV cook Clemens Wilmenrod in 1955. In 1957, a "Hawaiian Pizza" topped with pineapple, papaya, and chopped green pepper, but not ham or bacon, appeared in Portland, Oregon.

== In popular media ==
In 2014, Time listed Hawaiian pizza first on its list of "The 13 Most Influential Pizzas of All Time". Opinions towards Hawaiian pizza are generally polarized. Although many enjoy the taste, others vehemently dislike it, possibly due to the sweetness of pineapple paired with "salty pizza ingredients".

In 2017, Icelandic president Guðni Th. Jóhannesson reportedly told a group of high-school students during a Q&A that he was fundamentally opposed to putting pineapple on pizza. He jokingly added that he would ban pineapple as a pizza topping if he could, as long as he received 30% of the under-21 vote. His off-the-cuff remark generated a flurry of media coverage and inspired many, regardless of their taste for Hawaiian pizza, to express their opinions on social media. Celebrities shared their liking or distaste for Hawaiian pizza, including Canada's former prime minister, Justin Trudeau, who expressed support for it by tweeting, "I have a pineapple. I have a pizza. And I stand behind this delicious Southwestern Ontario creation." Panopoulos, at that point retired from the restaurant business, was called upon by some media outlets to defend his creation. Guðni later clarified that he was only joking, and that he did not have the power to ban particular toppings on pizza; he added that even he would not like to live in a country where the leader could ban anything that they did not like.

American author John Green reflected on the dish's cosmopolitan origins and reach, noting its Canadian invention by a Greek immigrant, inspired by Chinese cuisine to put a South American fruit on an Italian dish, which has gained its greatest popularity in Australia.

In 2025, in an effort to demonstrate their dislike of the style, a Norwich pizzeria began charging 100 pounds for pineapple pizza.

In 2026, an Italian man called David Tamburella was fired from his job as a chef at La Costa pizzeria in Brisbane, Australia for refusing to put pineapple on pizza. Tamburella filed a wrongful dismissal claim stating that "he considers, as an Italian, that putting pineapple on a pizza is an insult to his culture." Tamburella lost his wrongful dismissal claim because his application was filed too late.

== Surveys ==
Hawaiian was the most popular pizza in Australia in 1999, accounting for 15% of pizza sales.

A 2015 review of independent UK takeaways operating through Just Eat found the Hawaiian pizza to be the most commonly available. A 2016 The Harris Poll survey of US adults had pineapple in the top three least-favorite pizza toppings, ahead of anchovies and mushrooms.

According to a 2019 YouGov Omnibus survey, 12% of Americans who eat pizza say that pineapple is one of their three favorite pizza toppings, and 24% say that pineapple is one of their least favorite toppings. It was not the most disliked topping, however, as other ingredients were even more widely unpopular in the survey: anchovies and eggplant.

== See also ==
- Canadian cuisine
- Pizza in Canada
- List of Canadian inventions and discoveries
- List of pizza varieties by country
