= Hawaiian cuisine (disambiguation) =

Hawaiian cuisine may refer to:

- Cuisine of Hawaii, the broader food culture of the islands including the fusion of native, immigrant, ethnic, local, and restaurant cuisines within the diverse state of Hawaii.
- Native Hawaiian cuisine, pre-contact Polynesian cuisine and food eaten by ethnic Hawaiians
- Hawaii regional cuisine, a distinct fusion style popularized by professional chefs in Hawaii

== See also ==
- List of Hawaiian dishes, popular dishes found in the cuisine of Hawaii
