= List of Italian pig breeds =

This is a list of some of the pig breeds considered in Italy to be wholly or partly of Italian origin. Some may have complex or obscure histories, so inclusion here does not necessarily imply that a breed is predominantly or exclusively Italian.

== Principal breeds ==
- Apulo-Calabrese, also Calabrese, Nero di Calabria, or Nero Calabrese
- Casertana, also Di Teano, Pelatella
- Cinta Senese
- Duroc Italiana
- Italian Landrace
- Large White Italiana
- Mora Romagnola
- Nero di Parma
- Nero Siciliano
- Pugliese
- Sarda

== Minor and historic breeds ==
- Abruzzese
- Basilicata
- Bastianella
- Bergamasca Nera
- Borghigiana
- Calabrese
- Catanzarese
- Chianina
- Cosentina
- Faentina
- Forlivese
- Friulana Nera
- Fumati
- Gargano
- Garlasco
- Lagonegrese
- Macchiaiola Maremmana
- Murgese
- Napoletana Fulva
- Nero dei Lepini
- Nero dei Monti Dauni Meridionali
- Nero Reatino
- Parmigiana Nera
- Perugina
- Reggitana
- Riminese
- Rossa Modenese
- Samólaco
- San Lazzaro
- Siciliano
- Suino delle Nebrodi e Madonie
- Valtellina
