= Italian Landrace =

Italian breed of pig

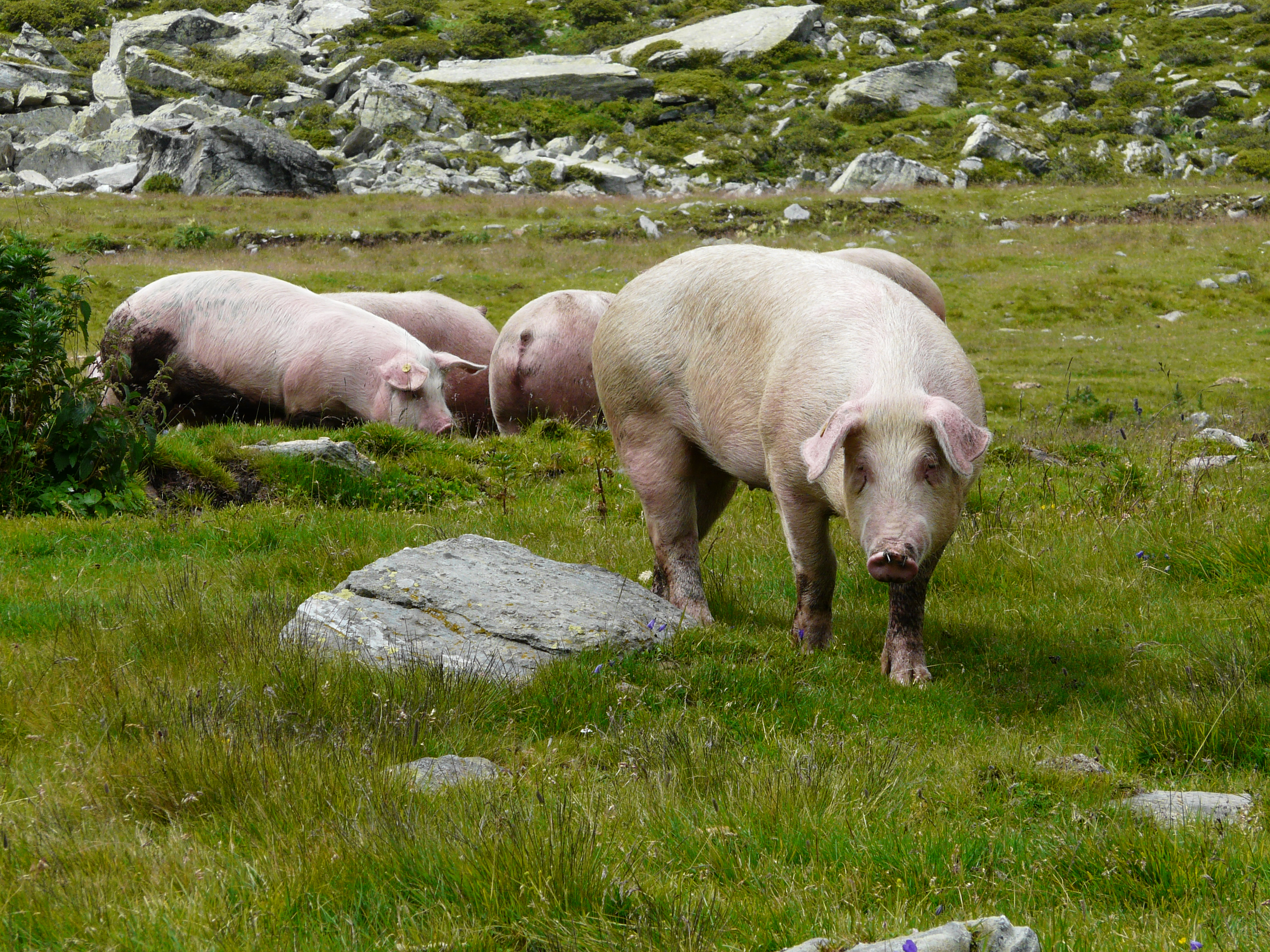
- Conservation status: FAO (2007): not at risk
- Other names: Italian: Landrace Italiana
- Country of origin: Italy
- Standard: Associazione Nazionale Allevatori Suini (in Italian)

Traits

The Italian Landrace (Italian: Landrace Italiana) is an Italian breed of domestic pig. It derives from the Danish Landrace breed developed in Denmark at the end of the nineteenth century. Stock was imported into Italy after the Second World War. The breed has been selected principally for suitability for the production of prosciutto crudo. It is, after the Large White Italiana, the second-most numerous pig breed in Italy. The breed standard is issued by the Ministero delle Politiche Agricole Alimentari e Forestali, the Italian ministry of agriculture and forestry; the herd-book is kept by the Italian: Associazione Nazionale Allevatori Suini, the national pig-breeders' association.

== History ==
Landrace pigs were imported into Italy from Scandinavia after the end of the Second World War. The Italian strain has been bred for size, specifically to produce the "Italian heavy pig" used to make prosciutto and other salumi. The smaller Belgian Landrace is also raised in Italy, usually for fresh meat.

A genealogical herd-book was established in 1970, and is kept by the Italian: Associazione Nazionale Allevatori Suini, the Italian national association of pig breeders. In 2007 there were 11749 pigs registered; at the end of 2012 the total was 5959. Most of the population is concentrated in the Po Valley, the principal area of Italy for raising heavy pigs.

== Characteristics ==
The Italian Landrace is a large pig, and very long in the body due to the presence of two or three supernumerary vertebrae – it has 15 or 16 rather than the usual 13. It is lop-eared; the hair is white, the skin is unpigmented.

== Use ==
Meat production from the Italian Landrace is normally from first-generation crosses with either the Large White Italiana or the Duroc Italiana breed, slaughtered at a weight of 160–170 kg; almost all of it is used to make preserved meat products. The pigs are usually farmed intensively.
