= Strade dei vini e dei sapori =

Collection of routes in Italy through major regional food and wine production areas

Le Strade dei vini e dei sapori (Roads of Wines and Tastes) is the name for the collection of routes in and around Italy, that lead to and through major regional food and wine production areas.

These routes, all in Emilia Romagna, are:

- in the Province of Piacenza:
  - Strada dei vini e dei sapori dei Colli Piacentini
- in the Province of Parma:
  - Strada del Culatello di Zibello
  - Strada del Prosciutto e dei vini dei Colli di Parma
  - Strada del Fungo Porcino di Borgotaro
- in the Province of Reggio Emilia:
  - Strada dei vini e dei sapori delle Corti Reggiane
  - Strada dei vini e dei sapori Colline di Scandiano e Canossa
- in the Province of Modena:
  - Strada dei vini e dei sapori della Pianura Modenese
  - Strada dei vini e dei sapori Città Castelli Ciliegi
- in the Metropolitan City of Bologna:
  - Strada dei vini e dei sapori dei Colli d'Imola
- in the Province of Ferrara:
  - Strada dei vini e dei sapori Provincia di Ferrara
- in the Province of Ravenna:
  - Strada del Sangiovese dei sapori delle Colline di Faenza
- in the Province of Forlì-Cesena:
  - Strada dei vini e dei sapori dei Colli di Forlì e Cesena
- in the Province of Rimini:
  - Strada dei vini e dei sapori dei Colli di Rimini

== See also ==
- Wine route
