= Cinta Senese =

Breed of pig

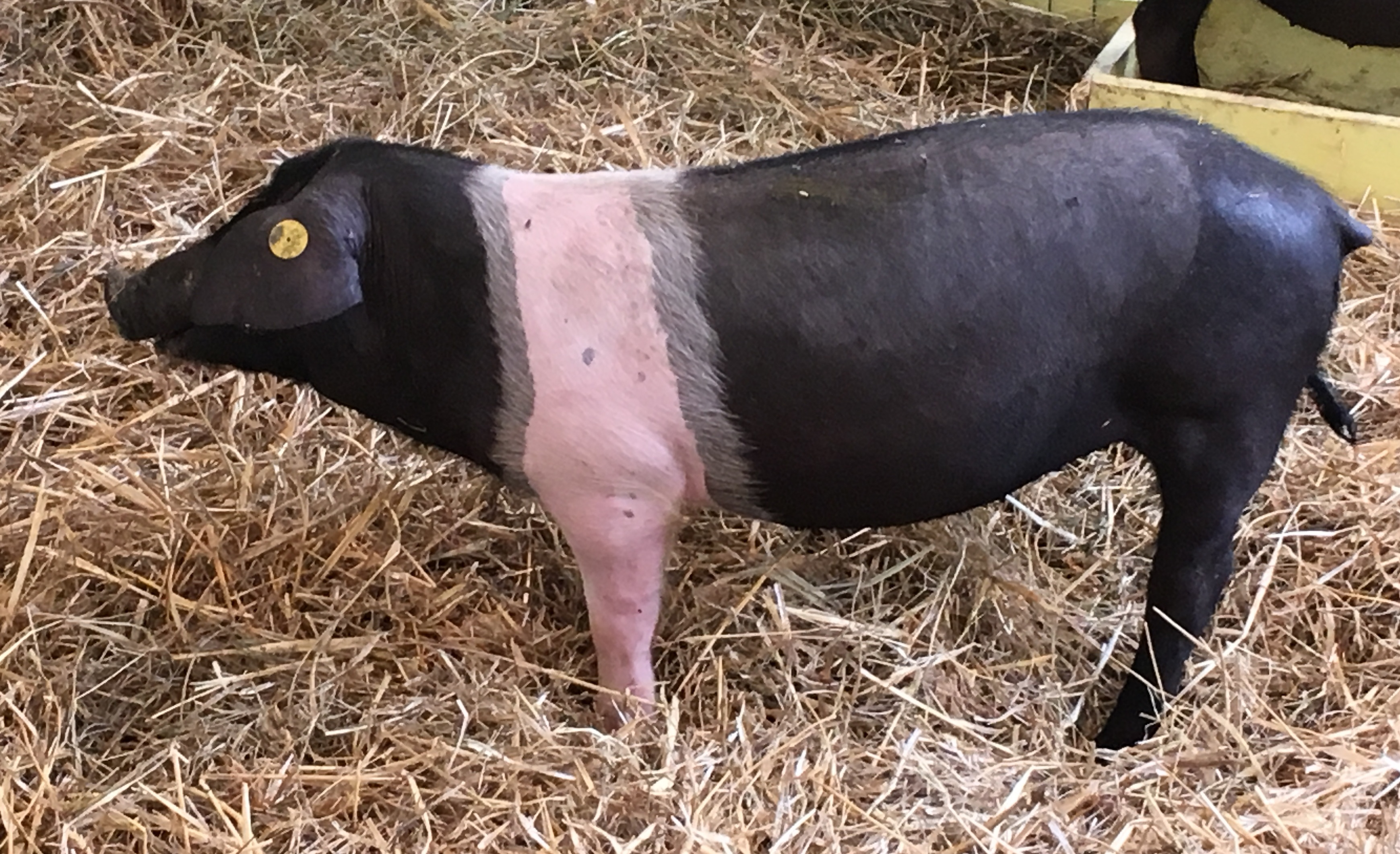

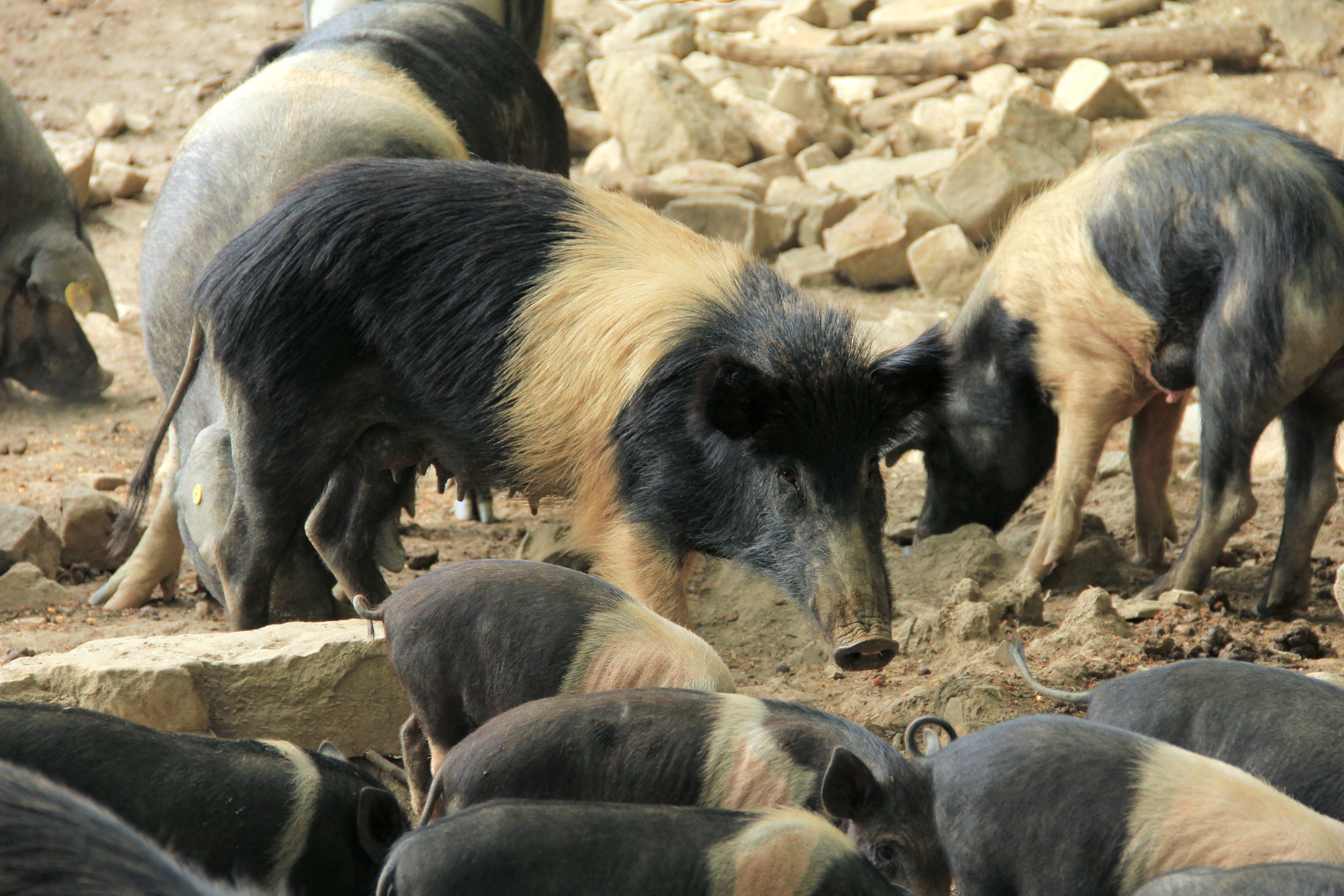
- Conservation status: FAO (2007): endangered; DAD-IS (2025): at risk/endangered
- Other names: Cinta; Cinto; Cinto Toscano; Cinturello Umbro; Cinturino Umbro; Suino Cinto Toscano DOP
- Country of origin: Italy
- Distribution: Tuscany
- Standard: ANAS (page 9, in Italian)

Traits
- Weight: Male: 150 kg; Female: 140 kg

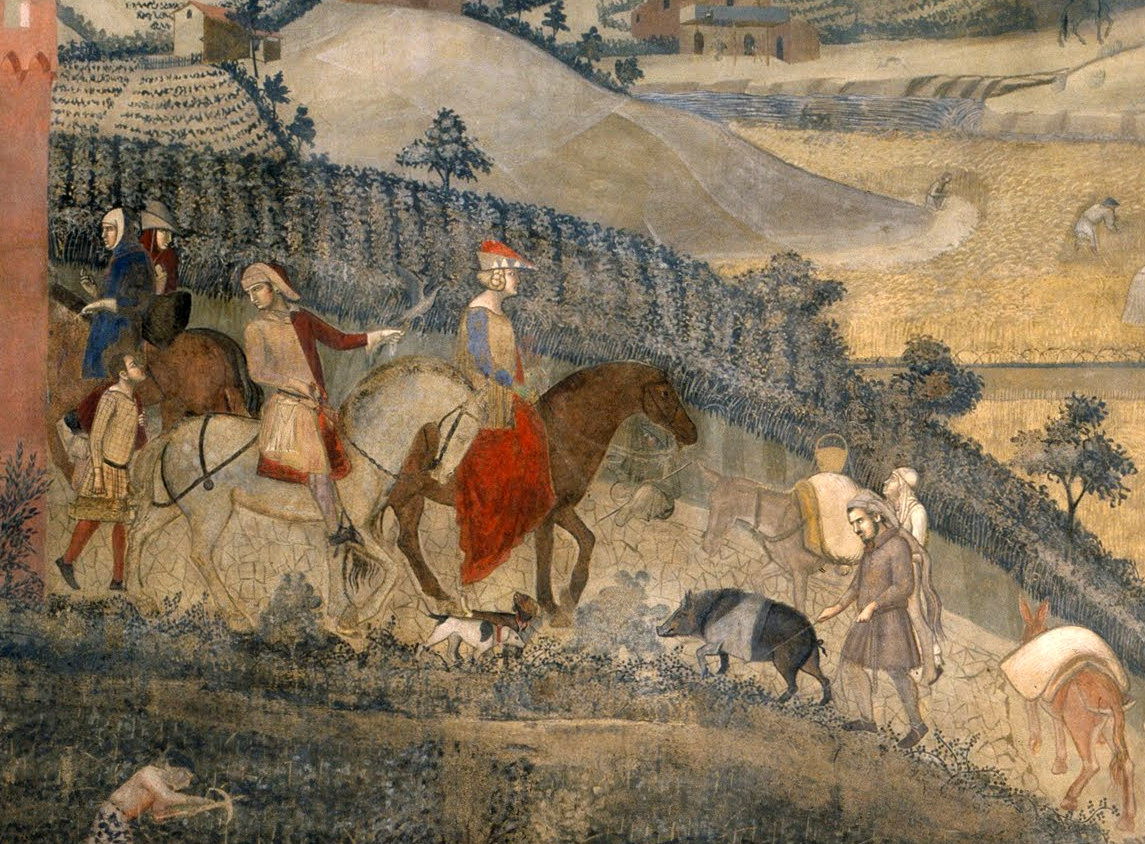
Ambrogio Lorenzetti, Effetti del buon governo in campagna, 1338–39, in the Palazzo Pubblico, Siena; detail, showing among other things a belted pig

The Cinta Senese (Note: (Italian pronunciation: [/ˈtʃinta seˈneːze; -eːse/])) is an Italian breed of domestic pig from the province of Siena, in Tuscany in central Italy. It is particularly associated with the Montagnola Senese and the comuni of Casole d'Elsa, Castelnuovo Berardenga, Gaiole in Chianti, Monteriggioni, Siena and Sovicille, in the area between the upper Merse and the upper Elsa rivers; it was in the past widely distributed throughout Tuscany.

Since 2006 animals raised in Tuscany under certain conditions have had DOP status, and are officially named Suino Cinto Toscano DOP.

== History ==
The Cinta Senese is a traditional breed of Tuscany, the only remaining Tuscan pig breed. It is believed to have a long history: a belted pig of similar appearance is shown in a fourteenth-century fresco – the Effetti del buon governo in campagna – by Ambrogio Lorenzetti in the Palazzo Pubblico of Siena.

A genealogical herd-book was established in the early 1930s. The population fell drastically after the Second World War, almost to the point of extinction, and the herd-book was discontinued in the 1960s. Following a recovery in numbers, the herd-book was re-opened in 1997, and is kept by the Associazione Nazionale Allevatori Suini, the Italian national association of pig breeders. The Cinta Senese is one of the six autochthonous pig breeds recognised by the Ministero delle Politiche Agricole Alimentari e Forestali, the Italian ministry of agriculture and forestry.

The population remains low: at the end of 2007 it was 2867; the conservation status of the breed was listed by the Food and Agriculture Organization of the United Nations as "endangered" in the same year. At the end of 2012 there were 2543 pigs registered, distributed over 111 farms.

== Characteristics ==
The Cinta Senese is a slow-growing pig, reaching an average weight of 40 kg at six months, 70 kg at one year and 130–150 kg after two years. Body weights for mature animals are variously given as 140 kg or 250 kg for sows and either 150 kg or 300 kg for boars.

The pigs are uniformly black, with a sharply defined white belt over the shoulders and down to the front hooves; the skin is black – either smoky or shiny – in the black areas, and unpigmented in the belt. Unlike the pig depicted by Lorenzetti, the modern breed has lop ears, falling forward over the eyes; this is variously attributed to inter-breeding with other (now extinct) Tuscan breeds including the Macchiaola and the Maremmana, or with transhumant pigs moving through the Maremma from the Garfagnana, from the Tosco-Emilian Apennines, from the Papal States and from the Kingdom of Naples; or otherwise with Wessex Saddleback pigs imported to Umbria in the 1950s.

== Use ==
The pigs are reared for their meat, which it is claimed has a fine veining of fat rather than the clear division between fat and lean seen in other pigs. Meat from animals reared in Tuscany under specific conditions has DOP status, and may be marketed as Suino Cinto Toscano DOP. It is used to make a wide variety of salumi, among them capocollo, gotino, lardo, prosciutto, rigatino and salame.

Management is extensive: the pigs are kept either in feral conditions, ranging freely in woodland – of oak, holm-oak, Turkey oak or chestnut – and foraging for greenery, acorns and the like; or they may provided with some simple shelter and with extra feed when needed.
