= Duroc Italiana =

Breed of pig

- Conservation status: not at risk
- Country of origin: Italy

Traits
- Weight: Male: 170 kg; Female: 160 kg

Notes
- Breed standard

The Duroc Italiana is the Italian strain of the American Duroc breed of domestic pig. It is the third most numerous pig breed in Italy, after the Large White Italiana and the Italian Landrace. It is one of the seven pig breeds of foreign origin recognised by the Ministero delle Politiche Agricole Alimentari e Forestali, the Italian ministry of agriculture and forestry, and one of the four for which a genealogical herdbook is kept by the Associazione Nazionale Allevatori Suini, the Italian national association of pig-breeders.

== History ==
A genealogical herdbook was established in 1980. In 2007 there were 6801 pigs registered; at the end of 2012 the total was 3985. Most of the population is concentrated in the Po Valley, where heavy pigs are mostly raised.

== Characteristics ==
The Duroc Italiana is a large pig with grey skin and reddish hair. It is fast-growing and strong, particularly in the limbs; these qualities are transmitted to its offspring. For pigs to be brought to high finished weights standing on concrete floors, very strong limbs are desirable.

== Use ==
The Duroc Italiana is used mostly to sire the crossbred "Italian heavy pigs" used to make prosciutto crudo and other salumi. Duroc boars are bred with Large White Italiana or Italian Landrace sows, or more frequently with hybrid sows from those two breeds. The pigs are usually farmed intensively and are slaughtered at a weight of 160–170 kg; the meat is almost all used to make preserved meat products such as Parma ham and prosciutto di San Daniele. Pure-bred Duroc Italiana pigs may not be used for this purpose.
