= Nero Siciliano =

Breed of pig

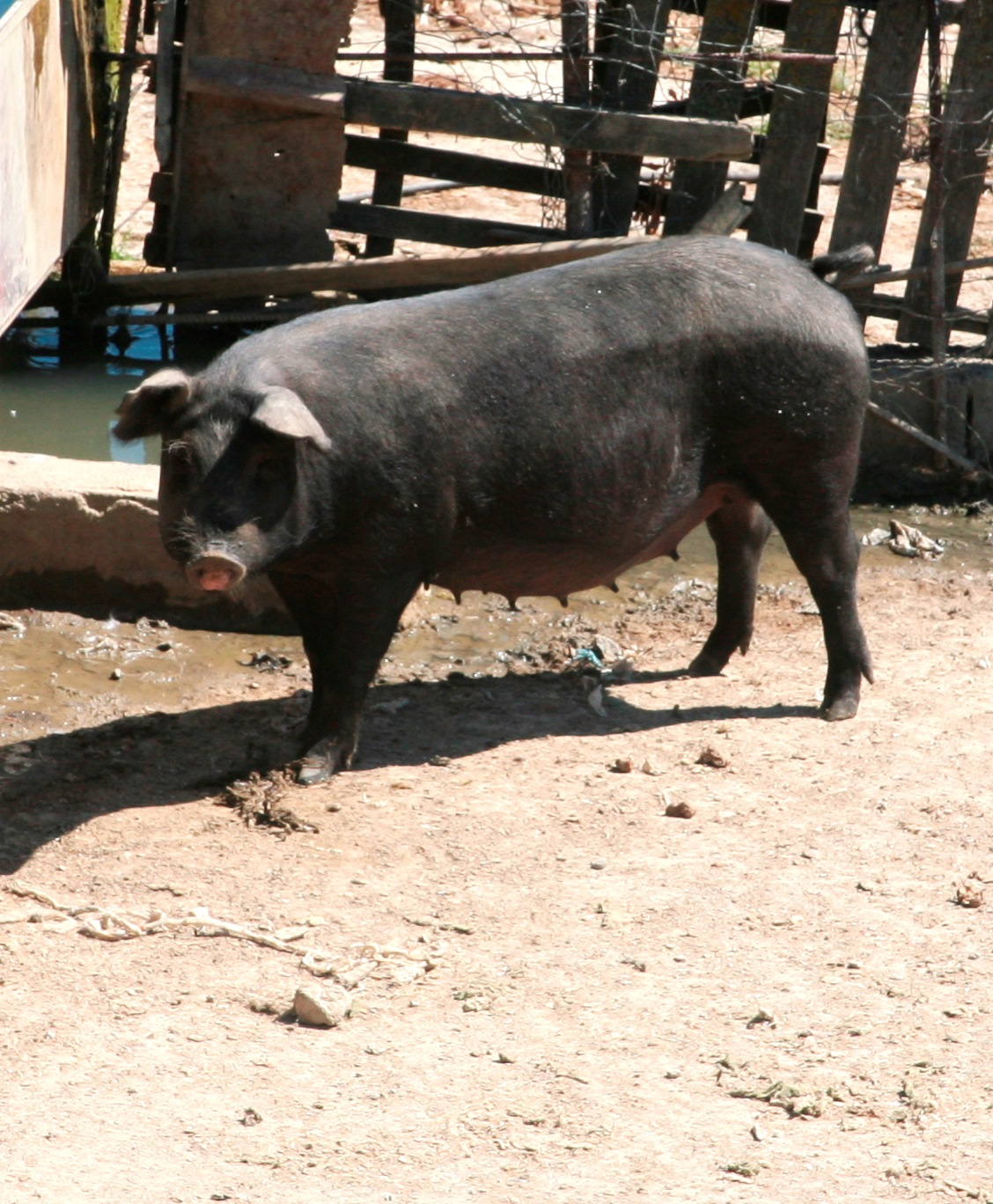
- Conservation status: FAO (2007): endangered; DAD-IS (2025): at risk/endangered-maintained
- Other names: Nero dei Nebrodi; Nero delle Madonie; Nero dell'Etna
- Country of origin: Italy
- Distribution: Sicily
- Standard: ANAS (in Italian)

Traits
- Weight: Male: 150 kg (330 lb); Female: 130 kg (290 lb)

The Nero Siciliano is an Italian breed of domestic pig from the Mediterranean island of Sicily, in southern Italy. It is raised mainly in the province of Messina, particularly in the Monti Nebrodi, and so is often known as the Nero dei Nebrodi. It may also be called Nero delle Madonie or Nero dell'Etna, for its association with the Madonie mountains and mount Etna respectively. It is one of the six autochthonous pig breeds recognised by the Ministero delle Politiche Agricole Alimentari e Forestali, the Italian ministry of agriculture and forestry.

== History ==
The Nero Siciliano is a traditional breed of the island of Sicily, and the only extant pig breed of the island; all others – among them the Calascibetta, the Di Castelbuono, the Cesarotana, the Patornese, the Sant'Agata di Militello, the Trapanese and the Di Troina (all of which were black) – have either become extinct, many of them as a result of the widespread deforestation of the island in the nineteenth century, or have been merged into the Nero Siciliano. The Nero Siciliano was formerly found in many parts of the island; in the twenty-first century it is reared almost exclusively in the forested mountains of northern Sicily – the Monti Nebrodi in the province of Messina and the Madonie in the Metropolitan City of Palermo.

A herdbook was established in 2001, and is kept by the Associazione Nazionale Allevatori Suini, the Italian national association of pig breeders. At the end of 2012 there were 3642 pigs registered. A total population of 4937 was reported for 2023, with 505 registered breeding sows and 136 registered boars; in 2025 the conservation status of the breed was listed in DAD-IS as "at risk/endangered-maintained".

== Characteristics ==
The Nero Siciliano is black, with a dorsal ridge of stiff hairs some 10 cm long; some white markings to the face only are tolerated. The skin is pigmented a slaty black. Average body weights are 130 kg for sows and some 20 kg more for boars.

== Use ==
The Nero Siciliano is commonly reared under a semi-feral system of management, foraging freely in the woodlands of the mountains; in some cases, simple shelters may be provided for farrowing and suckling sows, and some supplementary food may be provided.

The pigs are raised both for fresh meat and for salumi. Animals for direct consumption are usually slaughtered at 6–7 months, at a weight of 60–70 kg (130–150 lb), while those for the production of preserved meats are usually slaughtered at 10–11 months, when they weigh 110–120 kg (240–260 lb). The principal salumi are the Salame Sant'Angelo, which has IGP status, and Prosciutto di Suino Nero dei Nebrodi; capocollo, guanciale, and coppa are also produced.
