= Large White Italiana =

Breed of pig

- Conservation status: not at risk
- Country of origin: Italy

Traits
- Weight: Male: 200 kg; Female: 170 kg

Notes
- Breed standard

The Large White Italiana is the Italian strain of the British Large White or Yorkshire breed of pig. It is the most numerous pig breed in Italy. It is one of the seven pig breeds of foreign origin recognised by the Ministero delle Politiche Agricole Alimentari e Forestali, the Italian ministry of agriculture and forestry, and one of the four for which a genealogical herdbook is kept by the Associazione Nazionale Allevatori Suini, the Italian national association of pig-breeders.

== History ==
Yorkshire pigs were first imported into Italy in 1873, by the director of the Istituto Tecnico Agrario of Reggio Emilia. They spread rapidly, at first in the Po Valley, and soon throughout Italy. By 1886 they were in the area of Faenza; here two local populations, the San Lazzaro and the Bastianella (named for the estates where they were raised) acquired the status of sub-types. First-generation crosses of these with local Mora Romagnola pigs preserved some of the meat quality of the local breed, but grew much faster; because of their smoky colouring, these hybrids were known as Fumati.

A herdbook was established in 1970. At the end of 2007, there were 51,418 pigs registered. The breed is present throughout Italy; most of the population is concentrated in the Po Valley, where heavy pigs are mostly raised.

== Use ==
The large size, strong legs and rapid growth of the Large White made it suitable for intensive raising of the heavy pigs needed for production of prosciutto crudo – particularly Prosciutto di Parma and Prosciutto di San Daniele – and of other traditional Italian preserved meat products. The Italian strain has over a long period been selectively bred for this purpose. Both pure-bred Large White Italiana pigs and first-generation hybrids with other breeds are raised for slaughter, mainly for production of salumi; some, however, are slaughtered for fresh meat. The usual slaughter weight is about 160–170 kg.
