= Polesine Zibello =

- Comune
- Comune di Polesine Zibello
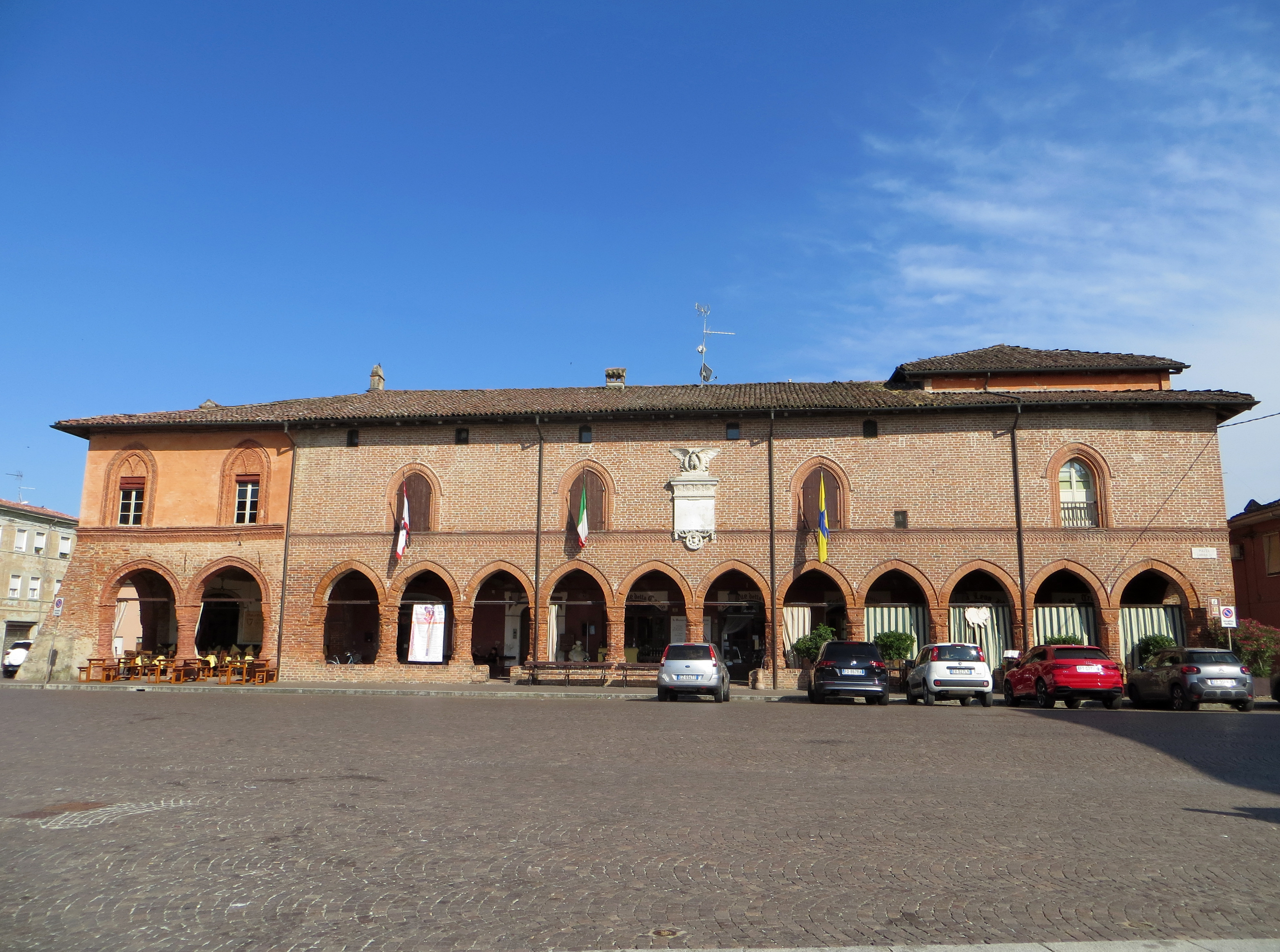
- Palazzo Pallavicino at Zibello.

- Coat of arms

- Location within Italy Location within Emilia-Romagna
- Coordinates: 45°1′N 10°5′E
- Country: Italy
- Region: Emilia-Romagna
- Province: Parma (PR)
- Frazioni: Ardella, Ardola, La Motta, Ongina, Pieveottoville, Polesine Parmense, Santa Croce, Santa Franca, Vidalenzo, Zibello

Government
  - Mayor: Attilio Ubaldi (commissar)

Area
  - Total: 48.51 km^{2} (18.73 sq mi)
- Elevation: 35 m (115 ft)

Population (1 January 2015)
  - Total: 3,265
  - Density: 67.31/km^{2} (174.3/sq mi)
- Time zone: UTC+1 (CET)
  - Summer (DST): UTC+2 (CEST)
- Postal code: 43016
- Dialing code: 0524
- Patron saint: St. Charles

Polesine Zibello (Parmigiano: Pülésan Zibèl) is a comune in the province of Parma, Emilia-Romagna, northern Italy. It was formed on 1 January 2016 after the merger of the comuni of Polesine Parmense and Zibello.

The Bassa Parmense area

The municipality is located in the Bassa Parmense area, northwest of Parma, it borders on Busseto, the home town of Giuseppe Verdi, and is one of the few places where culatello salami is produced.
