= Apulo-Calabrese =

Italian breed of pig

- Conservation status: FAO (2007): endangered-maintained; DAD-IS (2025): at risk/endangered
- Other names: Calabrese; Nero Abruzzese; Nero Calabrese; Nero dei Lepini; Nero dei Monti Dauni Meridionali; Nero dei Monti Lepini; Nero di Calabria; Nero di Capitanata; Nero Lucano; Nero Maremmano; Nero Pugliese; Nero Reatino; Pugliese
- Country of origin: Italy
- Standard: ANAS (in Italian)

Traits
- Weight: Male: 150 kg (at 1 year); Female: 120 kg (at 1 year)

The Apulo-Calabrese is an Italian breed of black domestic pig from Calabria, in southern Italy. It may also be known as the Calabrese, Nero Calabrese or Nero di Calabria, and by many other regional names. It derives from the old Pugliese pig breed of Puglia, which in turn derives from the Casertana breed of Campania; it is closely related to that breed. The Apulo-Calabrese is one of the six autochthonous pig breeds recognised by the Ministero delle Politiche Agricole Alimentari e Forestali, the Italian ministry of agriculture and forestry.

== History ==
The Apulo-Calabrese is particularly associated with the provinces of Catanzaro, Cosenza and Reggio di Calabria, and with the area of the Lagonegro in the province of Potenza. In the early twentieth century, local sub-types from these areas were known as the Catanzarese, the Cosentina, the Reggitana and the Lagonegrese respectively; all are now considered extinct. The Calabrese was the principal pig of the region; in the mid-1920s the population was recorded as 131736. Numbers fell drastically after the Second World War, and in particular from the 1970s, following the introduction of faster-growing foreign breeds such as the British Yorkshire.

A herd-book was established in 2001, and is kept by the Associazione Nazionale Allevatori Suini, the Italian national association of pig breeders. The population remains low: at the end of 2007 it was 499, and the conservation status of the breed was listed as "endangered-maintained" by the Food and Agriculture Organization of the United Nations in the same year. In 2012 total numbers were reported to be 2198. A population of 6062 head was reported for 2023, including 715 registered breeding sows and 86 registered boars; in 2025 its conservation status was listed as "at risk/endangered".

== Characteristics ==
The Apulo-Calabrese is a robust pig with strong bone. It is of small to medium size: at one year of age, sows weigh some 120 kg, boars about 150 kg. The hair is black, and longer on the back where it forms a spinal crest or ridge; there may be some white markings on the lower legs. The skin is also black. The facial profile is straight, the snout fairly narrow; the lop ears fall forward over the eyes.
