= Garlasco (disambiguation) =

Garlasco is a comune in the province of Pavia in the Italian region Lombardy.

Garlasco may also refer to:

- Marc Garlasco, a senior military expert for Human Rights Watch
- Garlasco pig, an Italian pig breed
