= Sarda pig =

Pig breed

Sarda
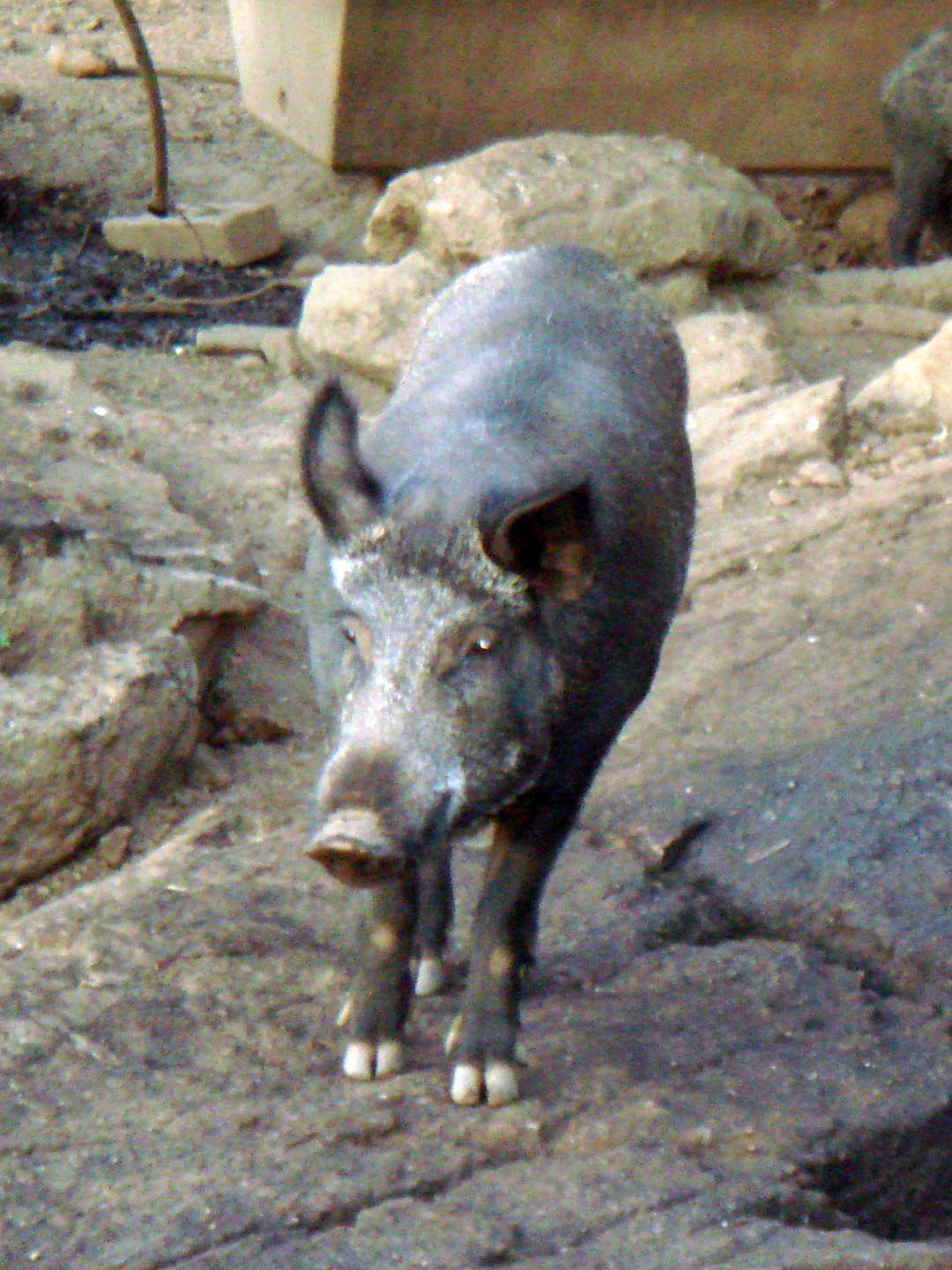
- Conservation status: FAO (2007): not listed; DAD-IS (2025): at risk/endangered
- Other names: Suino Sardo; Porcu Sardu
- Country of origin: Italy
- Standard: ANAS

Traits
- Weight: Male: 100 kg
- Height: 60 cm

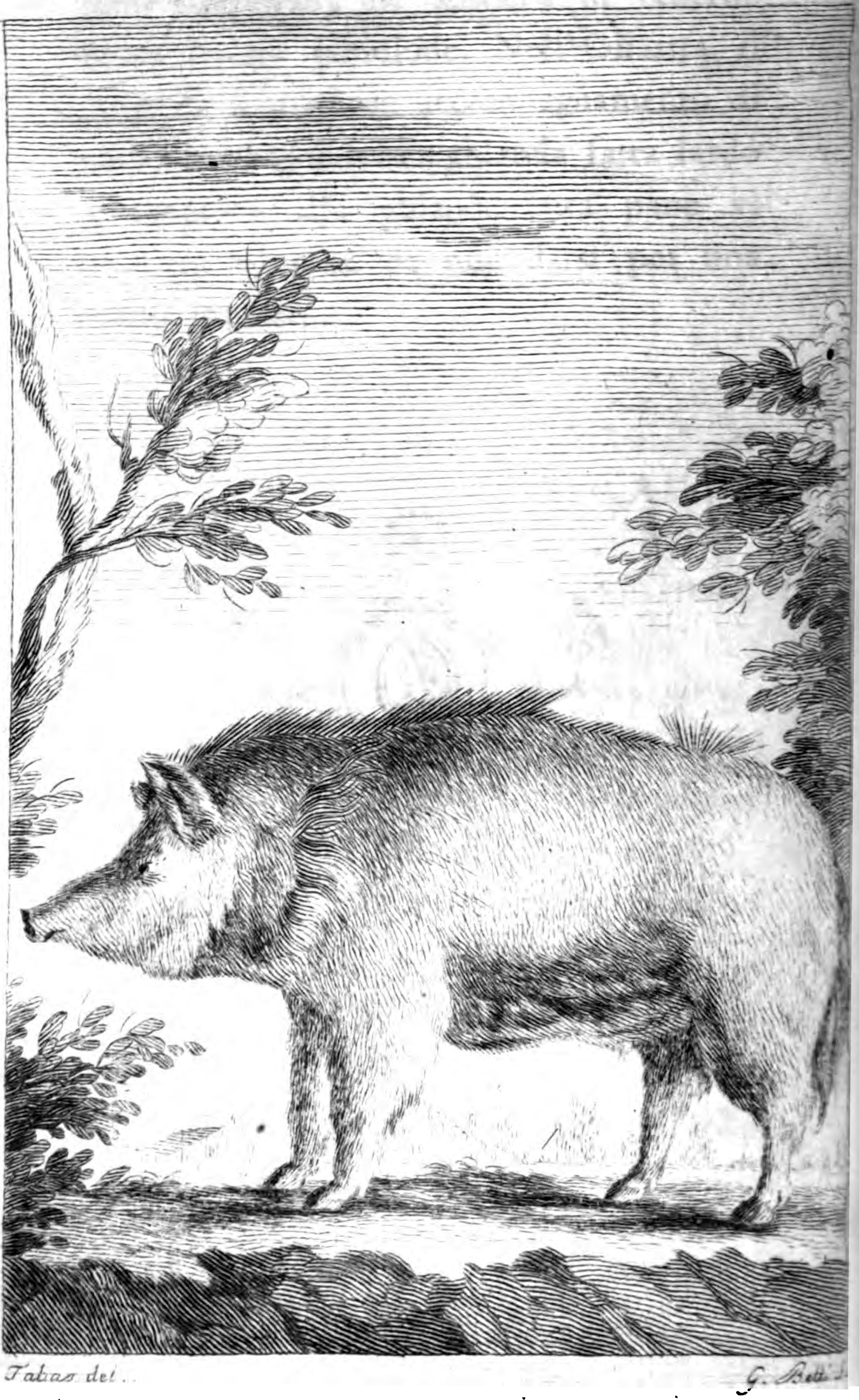
Engraving of a Sardinian pig, from Francesco Cetti, I quadrupedi di Sardegna, 1774

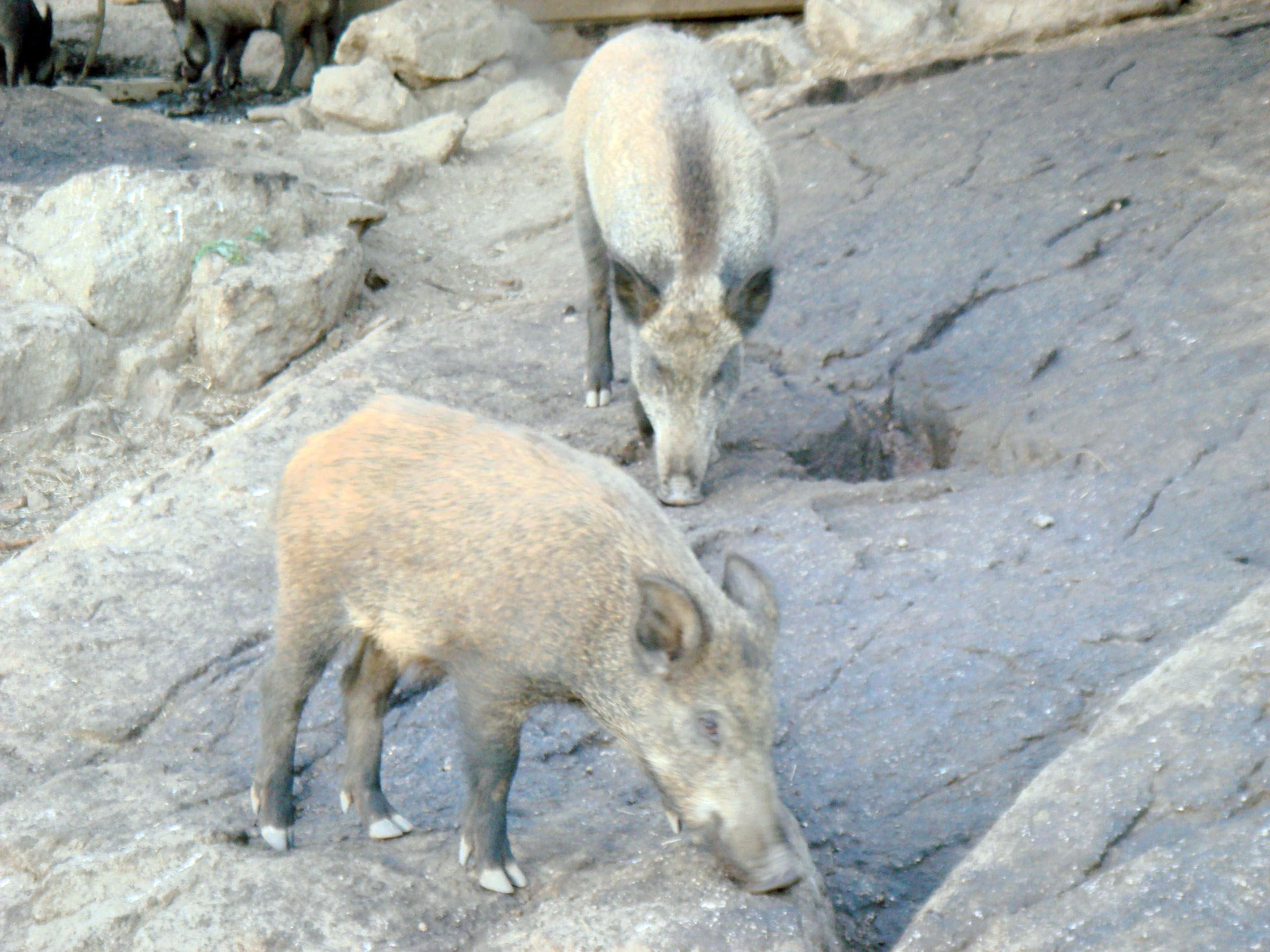
Two Sardinian pigs

The Sarda or Suino Sardo (Sardinian: Porcu Sardu) is an Italian breed of domestic pig from the Mediterranean island of Sardinia. It is raised mainly in the provinces of Ogliastra and Nuoro, but is also present in those of Medio Campidano and Sassari and in the Sarrabus-Gerrei sub-region. The Sarda breed was officially recognised by ministerial decree on 8 June 2006 and became the sixth autochthonous pig breed recognised by the Ministero delle Politiche Agricole Alimentari e Forestali, the Italian ministry of agriculture and forestry.

== History ==
The earliest detailed description of Sardinian pigs was written by Francesco Cetti in 1774, in his I quadrupedi di Sardegna:

What is most striking on first seeing it is the magnificence of its tail: it is not twisted, as is usual, nor short and naked, but hangs thick and straight to below the knee, [and is] thickly covered with bristle; it looks like the tail of a horse. Equally thick bristle covers the whole body, but on the ridge of the spine, the bristles stand upright almost like a blade, as far as half-way along the back; above the loins there is another threatening tuft of them.

Both the description and the accompanying illustration are comparable to present-day Sarda pigs and to the modern breed standard.

The herd-book was established in 2006, and is kept by the Associazione Nazionale Allevatori Suini, the Italian national association of pig breeders. At the end of 2012 there were 575 pigs registered.

In 2007, shortly after the breed was officially recognised, the total population was reported to consist of seventy-eight animals, with four boars and six breeding sows; it is likely that the actual numbers were much larger. The population reported to DAD-IS for 2023 numbered 874 pigs in all, with a breeding stock of 273 sows and 49 boars; the conservation status of the breed in 2025 was "at risk/endangered".

== Characteristics ==
The Sarda is a small pig, the smallest of the Italian breeds: height at the withers is approximately 60 cm; boars weigh 100 kg on average. The coat colour is highly variable: it may be black, fulvous, grey, red or white, either solid-coloured or with rounded patches or blotches of colour; the skin partially or wholly pigmented.

== Use ==
Management is almost always completely extensive: the pigs are allowed to range freely in wooded mountain areas, often including public land, where they feed on acorns, chestnuts and roots. Additional feed is given only in the summer, when natural sources of food are scarce. Pigmen train the pigs to come at their call to the usual feeding-place; feed is often given directly on the ground, or at the side of the road.
