= Culatello di Zibello =

Italian cured meat

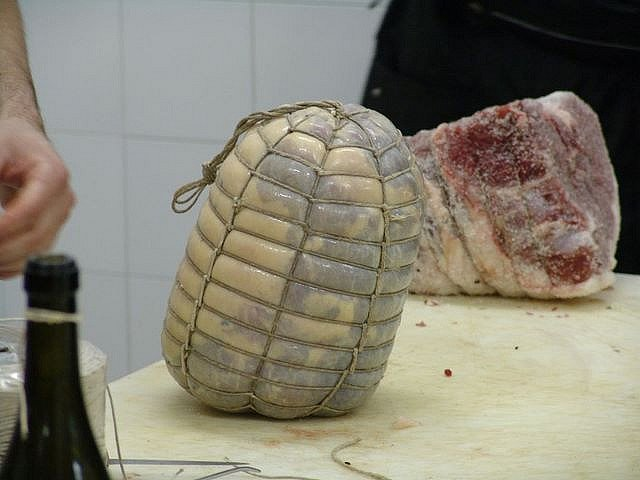
- Place of origin: Italy
- Region or state: Emilia-Romagna

Culatello di Zibello is a cured meat with a protected designation of origin (PDO) in the EU and UK typical of the province of Parma. Listed among the Slow Food Presidia of Emilia-Romagna, culatello, mentioned for the first time in a document dating back to 1735, is produced from the leg of a pork, which is then stuffed into the pig's bladder.

== Production ==
The Consortium of Culatello di Zibello has established that the processing of culatello di Zibello can take place only in a limited, specified area and only from October through February, when la bassa is enveloped in cold fog. It is then that the part of meat obtained from the thigh of adult pigs, bred according to traditional methods, is skinned, degreased, boned, separated from the fiocchetto and trimmed by hand, so as to give it its characteristic "pear" shape. The culatello and fiocchetto trimmings are then used in the preparation of strolghino.

These operations are followed, after about ten days, by salting and the so-called investiture, that is, the stuffing of the cured meat into the pig's bladder and the tying with string which, after aging, must have a large, irregular mesh. Careful aging in the cellar sees culatello from the winter fog to the summer heat, ready to be served the following winter when its unique flavor quality is in full bloom.

The aging period is from a minimum of 10 months for the smaller pieces (at least 3 kg) up to an average of 14 months for all pieces. The annual production is about 50,000 pieces of culatello di Zibello PDO.

== Gallery ==
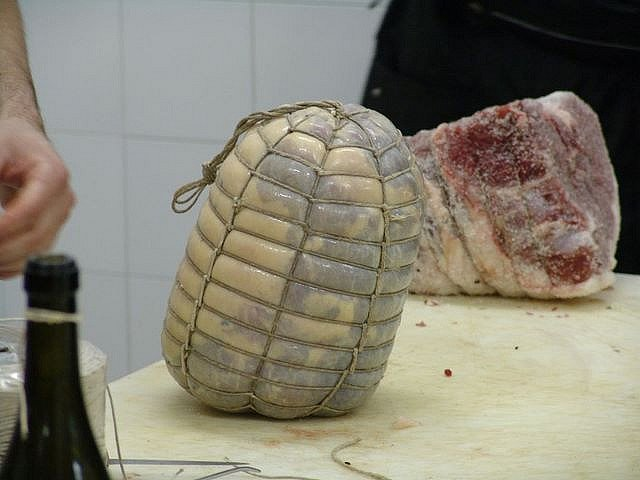
The meat stuffed inside of a bladder, before the aging process

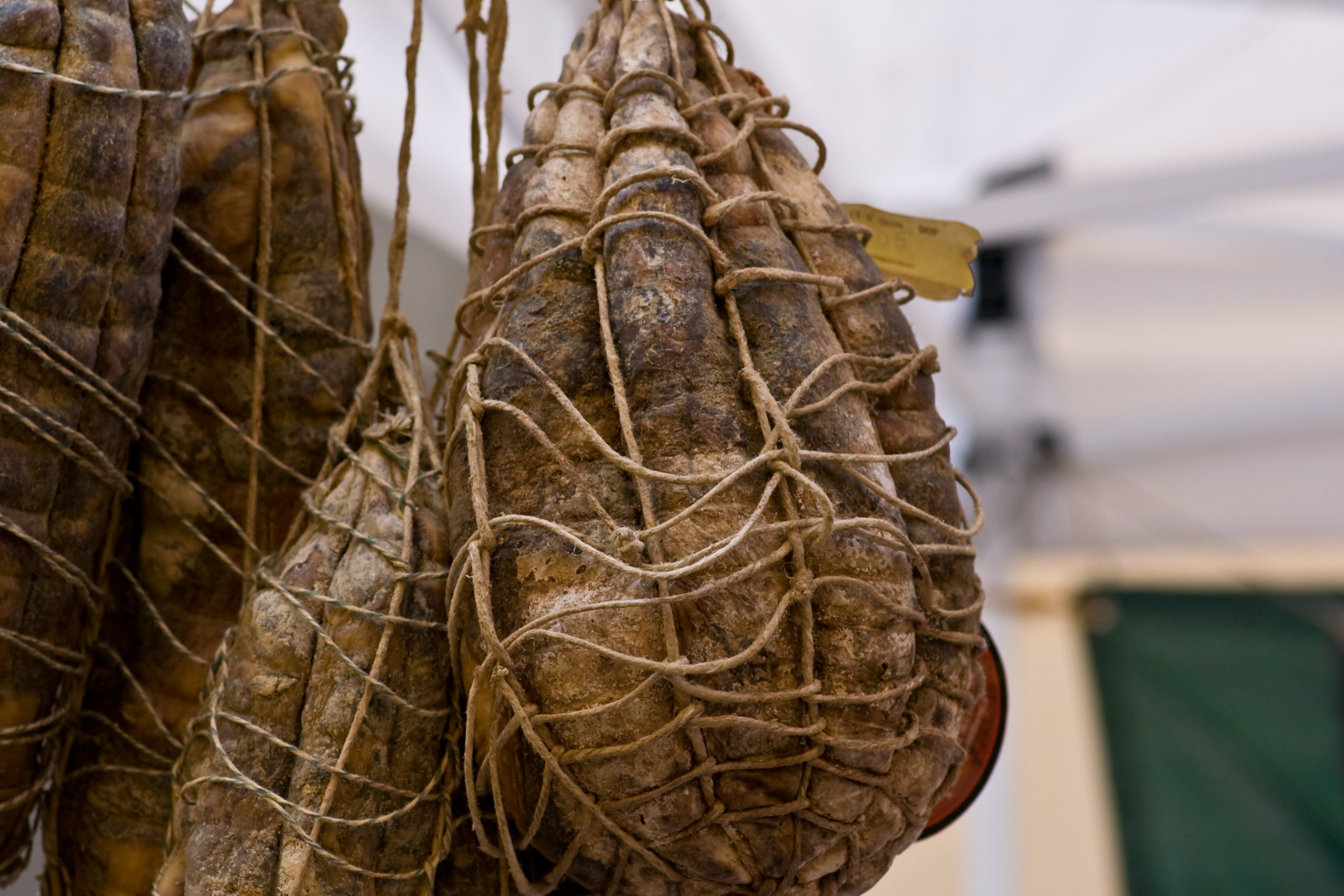
Aged culatello

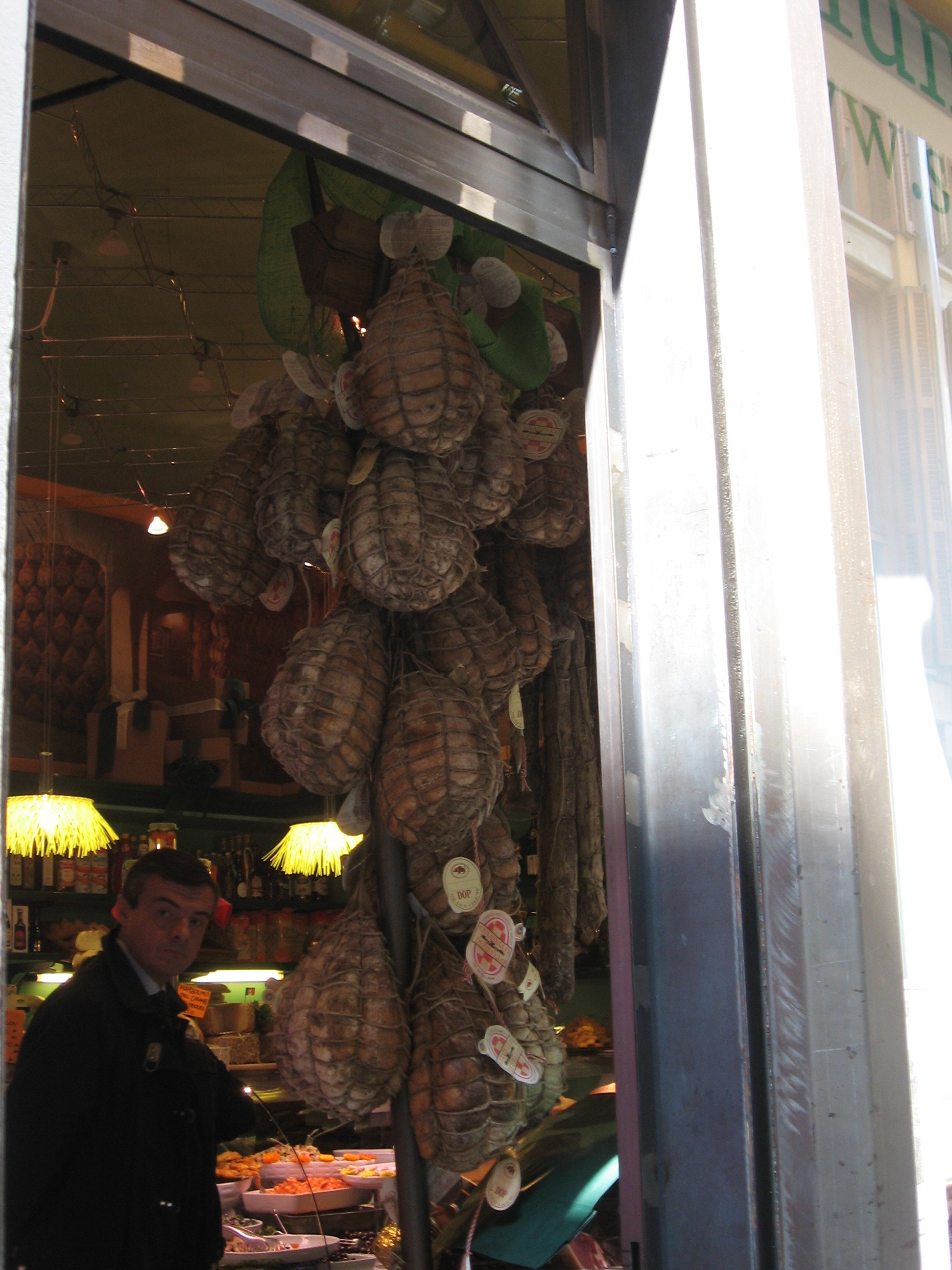
Several culatelli in a shop

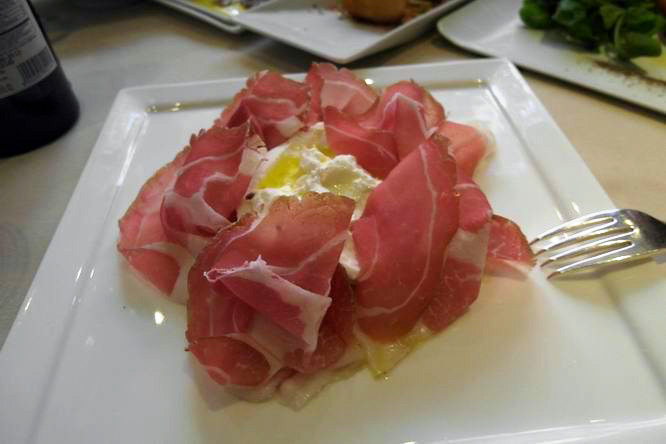
Culatello with burrata

== See also ==
Media related to Culatello di Zibello at Wikimedia Commons

- Culatello
