= Capocollo =

Italian and French pork cold cut

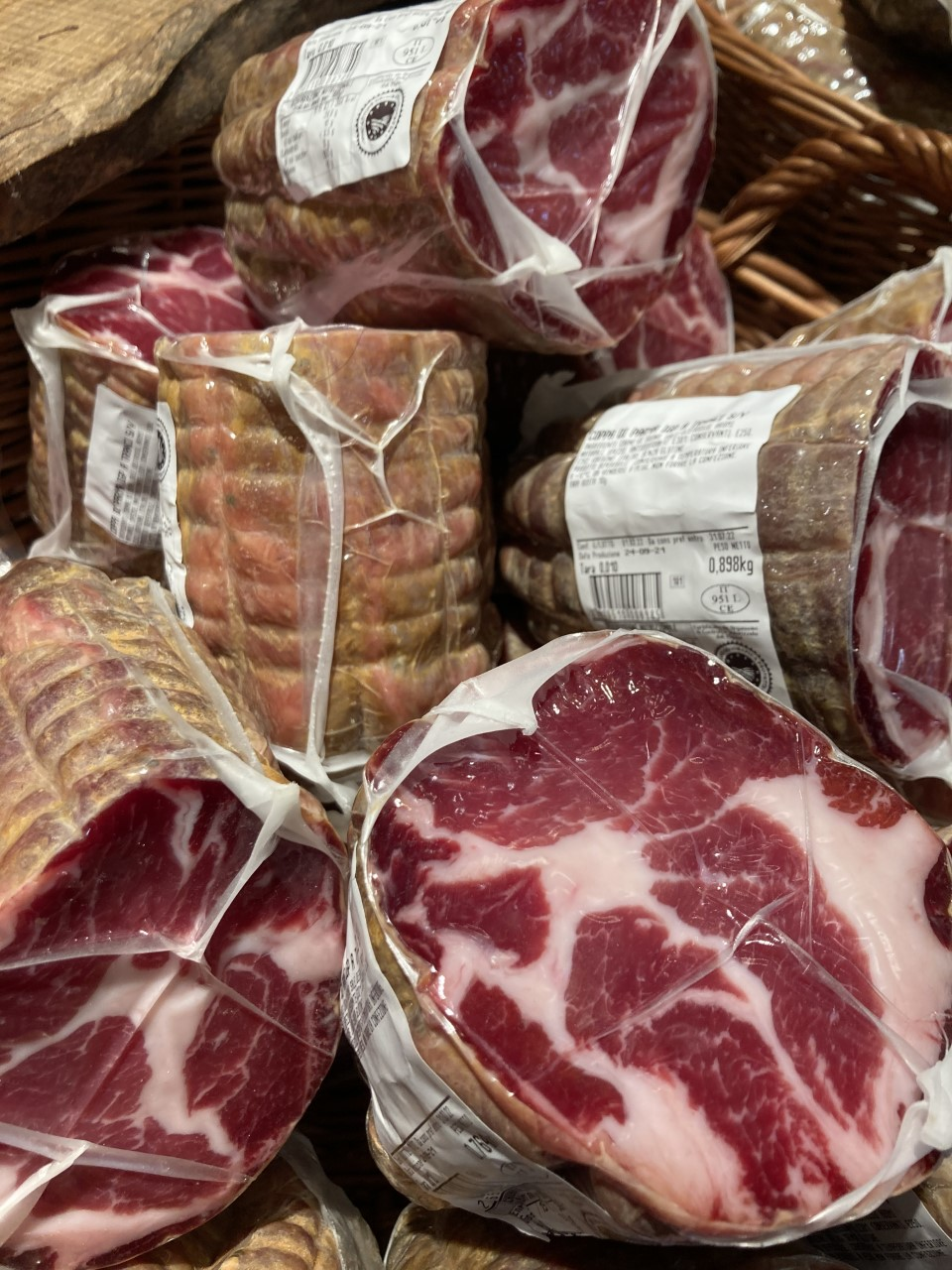
- Alternative names: Capicollo (Tuscia viterbese, Campania, Molise, Apulia, Basilicata and Calabria), ossocollo (Veneto and Friuli-Venezia Giulia), finocchiata (Siena), coppa di collo (Romagna), corpolongo (northern Lazio and central-southern Umbria), lonza (central-southern Lazio) or lonzino (Marche and Abruzzo), capicollu (Corsica), capicola (United States and Canada), bondiola (Argentina, Paraguay, and Uruguay), "copa-lombo" (Brazil), kraški zašink (Slovenia), gabagool (Northeastern United States)
- Place of origin: Italy
- Region or state: Emilia-Romagna; Apulia; Calabria; Basilicata; Lazio; Tuscany; Umbria; Marche; Campania; Molise; Abruzzo; Veneto; Sardinia

Capocollo (Italian: [kapoˈkɔllo]) or coppa (Italian: [ˈkɔppa, ˈkoppa]) is an Italian pork salted meat made from the dry-cured muscle running from the neck to the fourth or fifth rib of the pig shoulder or neck. It is whole-muscle, dry cured, and typically sliced very thinly. It is similar to the more widely known cured ham (prosciutto), because they are both pork-derived cold cuts used in similar dishes. It is not brined as ham typically is.

== Etymology ==
This cut is typically called capocollo or coppa in much of Italy, Corsica, and southern Switzerland (Ticino and the Grisons). This name is a compound of the words capo ('head') and collo ('neck'). Regional terms include capicollo (Campania and Calabria) and capicollu (Corsica).

Outside of Europe, terms include bondiola or bondiola curada in Argentina, Paraguay, and Uruguay, and capicola or capicolla in North America. The pronunciation gabagool has been used by some Italian Americans in the New York City area and elsewhere in the Northeast US, based on the Neapolitan language word capecuollo (pronounced [kapəˈkwollə]) in working-class strata of 19th- and early 20th-century immigrants. This pronunciation was used in the television series The Sopranos, and its use has become a stereotype.

== Varieties and official status ==
Four particular varieties (coppa piacentina, capocollo di Calabria, coppa de Corse, and capocollo di Martina Franca) have PDO and PGI (capocollo di Martina Franca) status under the Common Agricultural Policy of European Union law, which ensures that only products genuinely originating in those regions are allowed in commerce as such.

Four additional Italian regions produce capocollo, and are not covered under European law, but are designated as prodotti agroalimentari tradizionali (PAT) by the Italian Ministry of Agricultural, Food, and Forestry Policies:

- Capocollo della Basilicata;
- Capocollo del Lazio;
- Capocollo tipico senese or finocchiata, from Tuscany;
- Capocollo dell'Umbria.

In Slovenia, it enjoys an EU-protected designation of origin as kraški zašink. Outside Europe, capocollo was introduced to Argentina by Italian immigrants, under the names bondiola or bondiola curada.

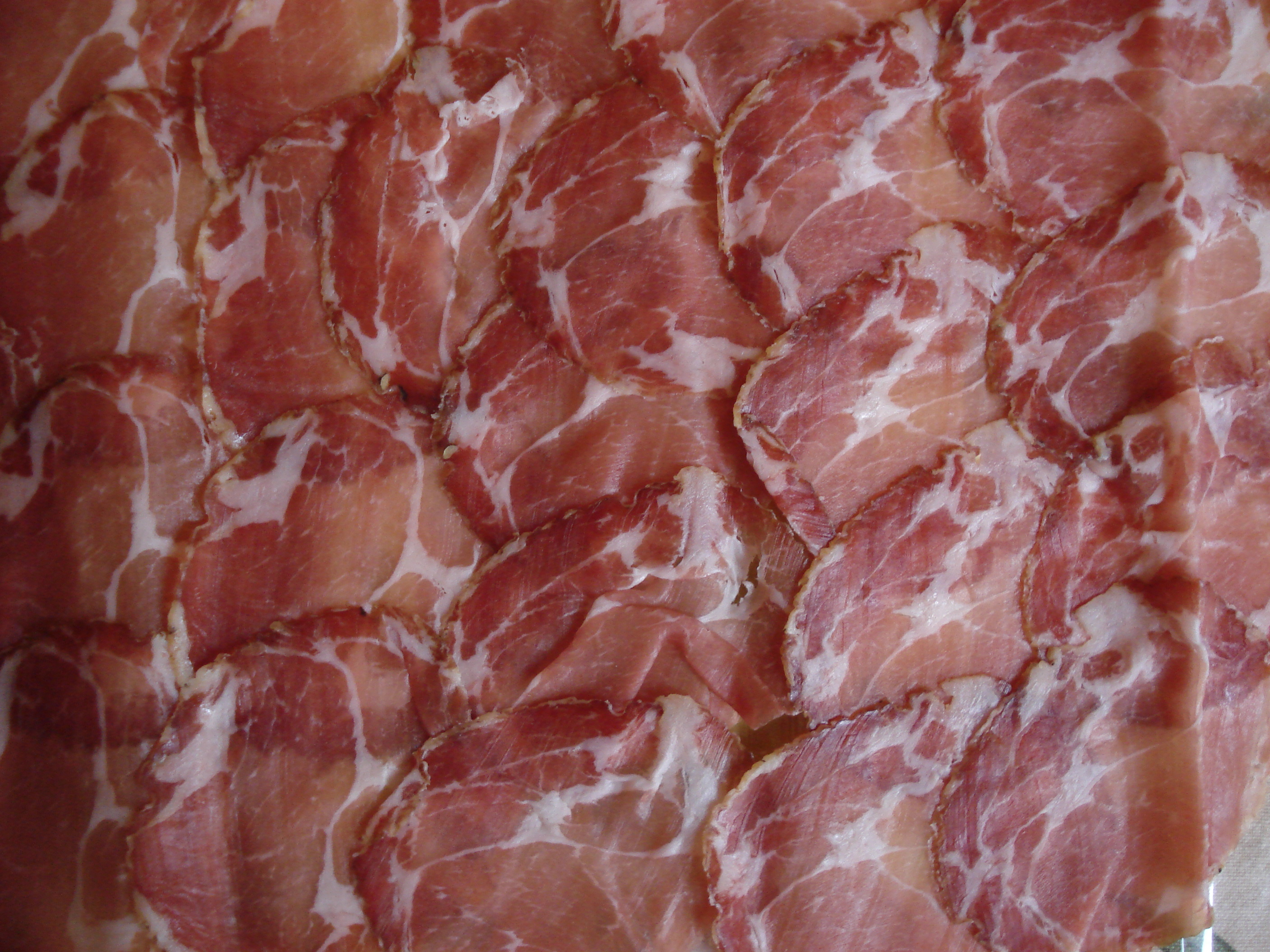
Slices of Coppa Spécialité Corse (Corsica): a balanced quantity of white fat is important for flavour and tenderness.

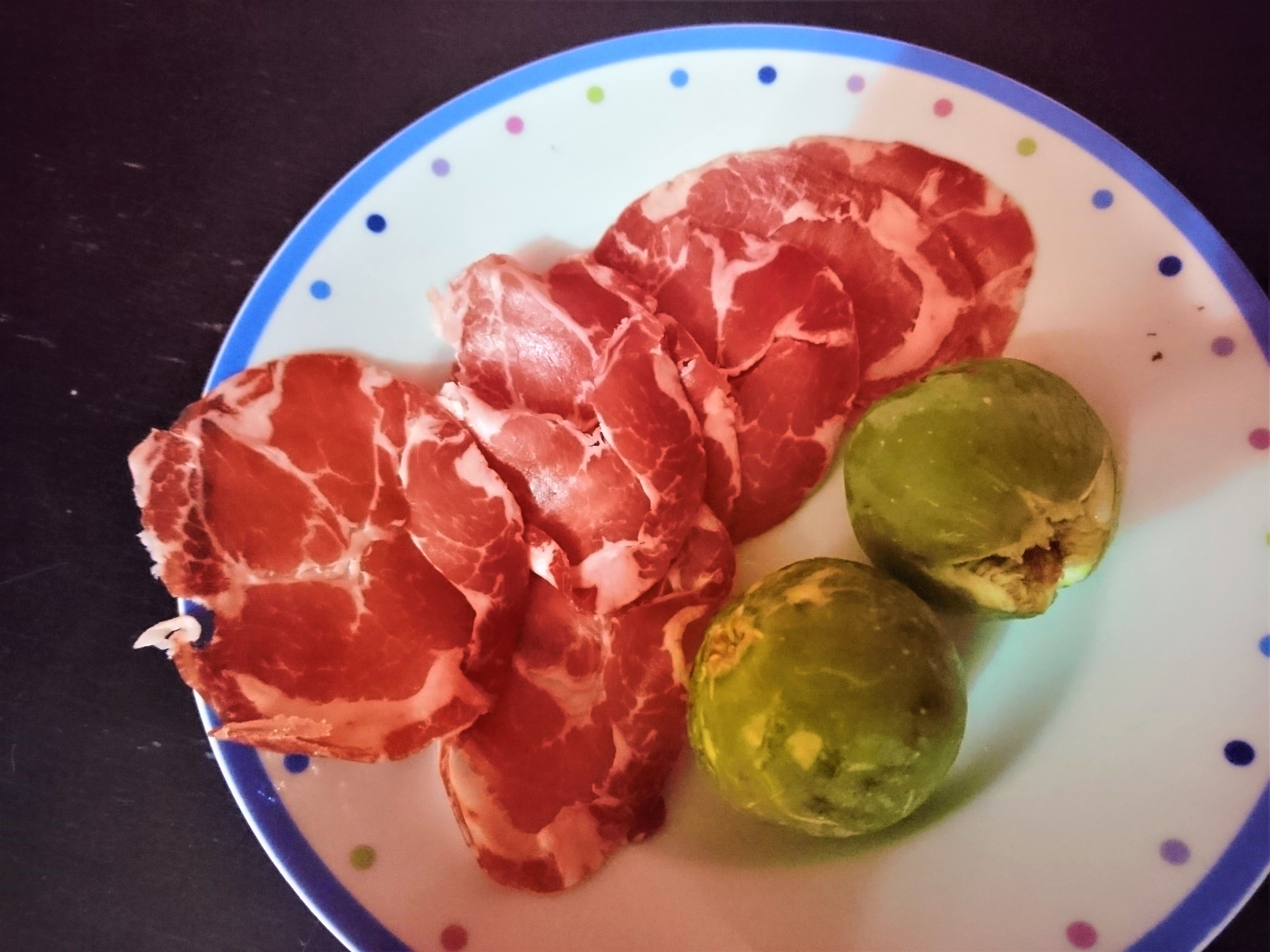
Slices of capocollo di Martina Franca served with figs

== See also ==
- List of dried foods
