= Nero di Parma =

Breed of pig

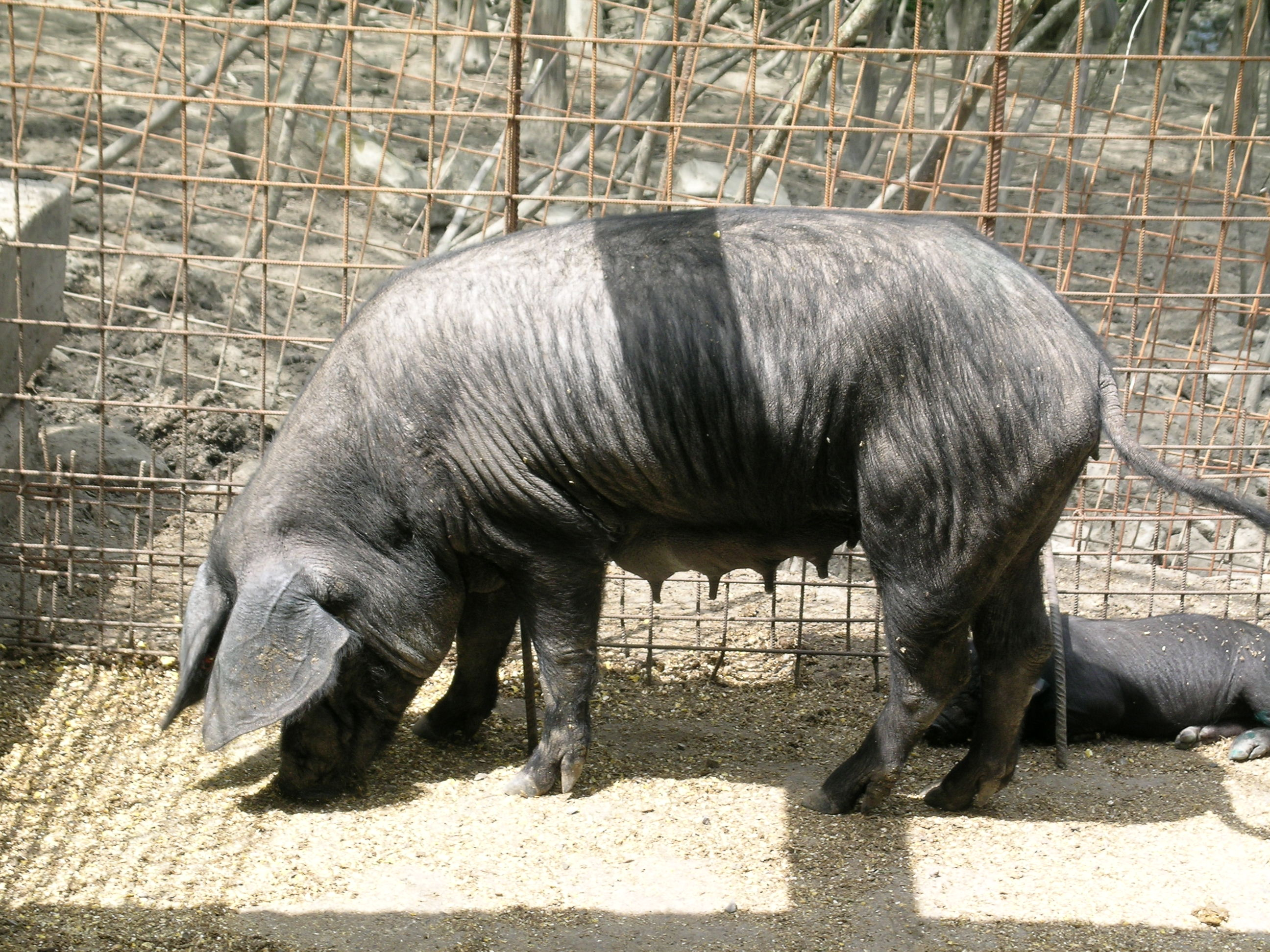
- Country of origin: Italy

Traits

The Nero di Parma is a breed of pig from the province of Parma, in the Italian region of Emilia-Romagna. It is a modern recreation of the ancient Nera Parmigiana breed, which became effectively extinct in the second half of the twentieth century, following the importation of pig breeds from Britain, though it is still listed in DAD-IS. From the mid-1990s, the breed was re-created from a small number of primitive animals located in the areas of Santa Margherita di Fidenza, Bardi, and Pellegrino Parmense, and in 2008 numbered about 300. A herdbook is kept by the Associazione Nazionale Allevatori Suini, the Italian national association of pig-breeders. It is not among the pig breeds recognised by the Ministero delle Politiche Agricole Alimentari e Forestali, the Italian ministry of agriculture and forestry.
