= Pieveottoville =

- Frazione
- Location of Pieveottoville in Italy
- Country: Italy
- Region: Emilia-Romagna
- Province: Parma
- Comune: Polesine Zibello
- Elevation: 34 m (112 ft)

Population
  - Total: 687
- Demonym: pievani
- Time zone: UTC+1 (CET)
  - Summer (DST): UTC+2 (CEST)
- Postal code: 43016
- Dialing code: 0524
- Patron saint: John the Baptist
- Saint day: 24 June

Pieveottoville is a frazione/village of Polesine Zibello in the Province of Parma in Emilia-Romagna with a population of 687 people.

== Monuments and places of interest ==
=== Collegiate of St. John the Baptist ===
Built in the 11th century to replace the parish of Saint Mary of Cucullo. The church was expanded in 1436 and was elected Deanery in 1601. In 1683 it was renovated in a Baroque style and elevated to a Collegiate Church in 1687. In 1778 a new bell tower was built, the apse was renovated in 1859 and the next year a neoclassical face, designed by Pier Luigi Montecchini, and decorated with frescos during the following decade. The church is home to many works of art, especially paintings and frescos by Giuseppe Moroni, Girolamo Magnani, Antonio Rossi, Pietro Baratta and Gaetano Signorini. The chorus and chancel of the seventeenth century were carved by Giovanni and Vincenzo Biazzi. The 1583 baptismal font is made from Red Verona marble and the organ is a Serassi from 1790.
