= Mora Romagnola =

Italian breed of pig

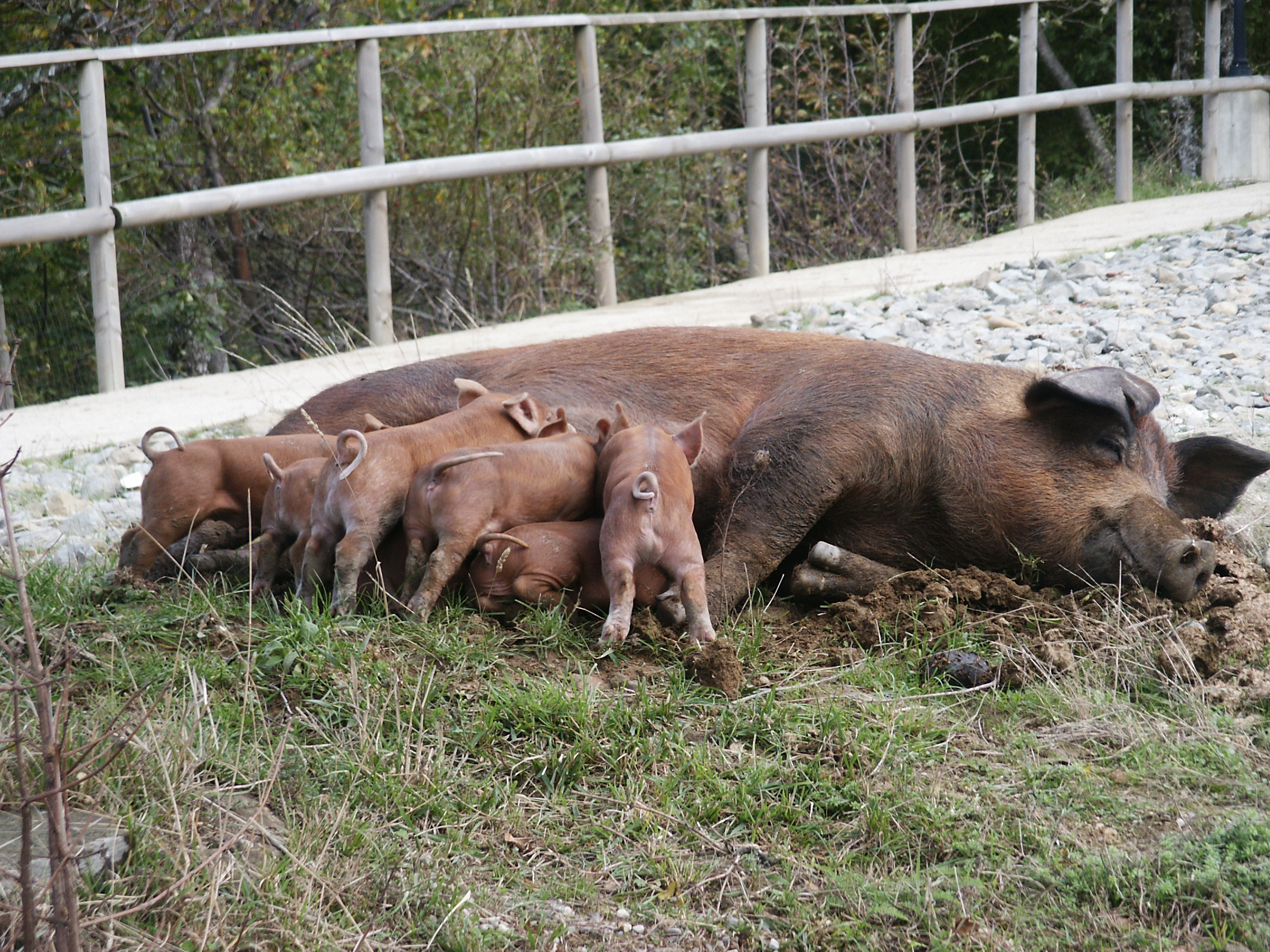
- This sow appears to be a Mora Romagnola
- Conservation status: FAO (2007): critical
- Other names: Mora; Bruna romagnola; Castagnina; Forlivese
- Country of origin: Italy
- Standard: ANAS

Traits
- Weight: Male: 200 kg; Female: 160 kg

The Mora Romagnola is an Italian breed of pig from Emilia-Romagna, in northern Italy. It may also be called Mora, Bruna Romagnola, Castagnina or Forlivese. It is raised principally in Emilia–Romagna, but also in Campania, Friuli-Venezia Giulia, Lombardy, the Marche, Piemonte and the Veneto. It is one of the six autochthonous pig breeds recognised by the Ministero delle Politiche Agricole Alimentari e Forestali, the Italian ministry of agriculture and forestry.

== History ==
In the early twentieth century there were several similar but distinct regional sub-types of Romagnolo pig, including the Forlivese from the area of Forlì, the Faentina from the area of Faenza and the Riminese or Mora Riminese from the area of Rimini. From the beginning of the century all of these types began to be crossed with British Yorkshire pigs, which were first imported to the area in 1886. First-generation crosses preserved some of the meat quality of the local breeds, but grew much faster; because of their smoky colouring, these hybrids were known as Fumati. By 1927 it was recognised that indiscriminate cross-breeding beyond the first generation would lead to the disappearance of the local stock, and in 1941 selective breeding of Romagnolo pigs began; in 1942 the breed was named Mora Romagnola, for its brownish-black colouring.

In 1918 there were 335000 Romagnolo pigs in Italy. The population declined rapidly both before and after the Second World War, falling to 22000 in 1950 and to a low of 12, all in one farm, in the early 1990s. At that point the Italian World Wildlife Fund, the Università degli Studi di Torino and other institutions launched a recovery project, and numbers have since increased. A herd-book was established in 2001, and is kept by the Associazione Nazionale Allevatori Suini, the Italian national association of pig breeders. The conservation status of the Mora Romagnola was listed as "critical" by the Food and Agriculture Organization of the United Nations in 2007; in 2025 it was listed in DAD-IS as "at risk/critical".. At the end of 2012 a population of 1063 was reported.

The breed remains at risk from crossing with Italian Duroc pigs; first-generation hybrids are difficult to distinguish from pure-bred stock.
