= Casertana pig =

Italian breed of pig

Casertana
- Conservation status: FAO (2007): critical
- Other names: Maiale di Teano; Teanese; Pelatella
- Country of origin: Italy

Traits
- Weight: Male: 170 kg; Female: 140 kg

Notes
- Breed standard

The Casertana is a breed of domestic pig from Campania, in southern Italy. It is mainly associated with the province of Caserta, from which its name derives, but was in the past also raised in the provinces of Campobasso, Naples, Rome and Salerno. The area of the lower basin of the Garigliano and Volturno rivers, including the comuni of Carinola, Mondragone, Minturno, Sessa Aurunca and Teano, was particularly known for production of the breed, which may also be known as the Teanese after the town of Teano.

The Casertana has two unusual physical traits: it is virtually or totally hairless, which gives rise to its alternative name Pelatella, "hairless one"; and it has two wattles or cylindrical appendages hanging from the lower part of the throat.

It is one of the six autochthonous pig breeds recognised by the Ministero delle Politiche Agricole Alimentari e Forestali, the Italian ministry of agriculture and forestry.

== History ==
The Casertana was in the past numerous and widely distributed in Italy. According to a census taken in 1942, there were more than 50,000 head in the province of Caserta alone. As with other indigenous Italian pig breeds, numbers fell sharply in the second part of the twentieth century, and the Casertana came close to extinction.

A herdbook was established in 2001, and is kept by the Associazione Nazionale Allevatori Suini, the Italian national association of pig breeders. The population remains low: at the end of 2007 it was 594, and conservation status of the breed was listed as "critical" by the FAO. At the end of 2012 there were 403 pigs registered.
