= Strolghino =

Italian cured pork

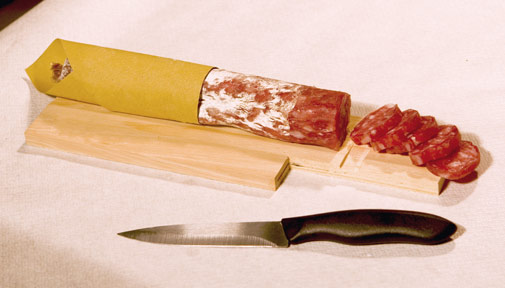
Strolghino

Strolghino (Italian: [strolˈɡiːno]) is a salume prepared from pork. It is thin, with an average weight of 300 grams, and may be prepared from the "lean leg meat" of the domestic pig. Leftover cuts of meat from the preparation of culatello are typically used. It may be prepared from parts of the pig that are not used in ham. Strolghino may only be available for only a few months in some areas. It may have a relatively short curing time of 15–20 days, which results in a very tender product resembling "fresh, raw sausage meat".

The word derives from the word strolga, which in the Emilian dialect means 'witch' or 'soothsayer'/'fortune-teller', as it was believed that they could be used as an early predictor of the quality of the culatello—which requires a much longer curing time—from which the meat used to make the strolghino was trimmed.

In the Italian cities of Cremona and Parma, it may be referred to as "salame strolghino", and its preparation in these areas may include curing for three months. Up to around 2010, its availability in Italy was rather rare, but since then its availability has somewhat increased. As of 2012, strolghino was not protected or regulated in Italy, e.g. with a denominazione di origine protetta (DOP) or protected geographical indication.

Strolghino may be paired with champagne or wine.

== Authenticity ==
Authentic strolghino has been described as only being prepared in the lowlands of Parma, by producers of culatello. These preparations do not contain food preservatives, and have a shelf life of less than two months. It has also been described as having an average shelf life of 40 days. In this region, the production of culatello and strolghino runs concurrently, since strolghino is prepared from leftover cuts of culatello.

== Counterfeits ==
Some products labeled as strolghino may be counterfeits, actually being a different type of salami or modified salami. Those labeled as strolghino that have a hard texture or spicy/salty flavor are not authentic.

== See also ==
- List of dried foods
