= Zibello =

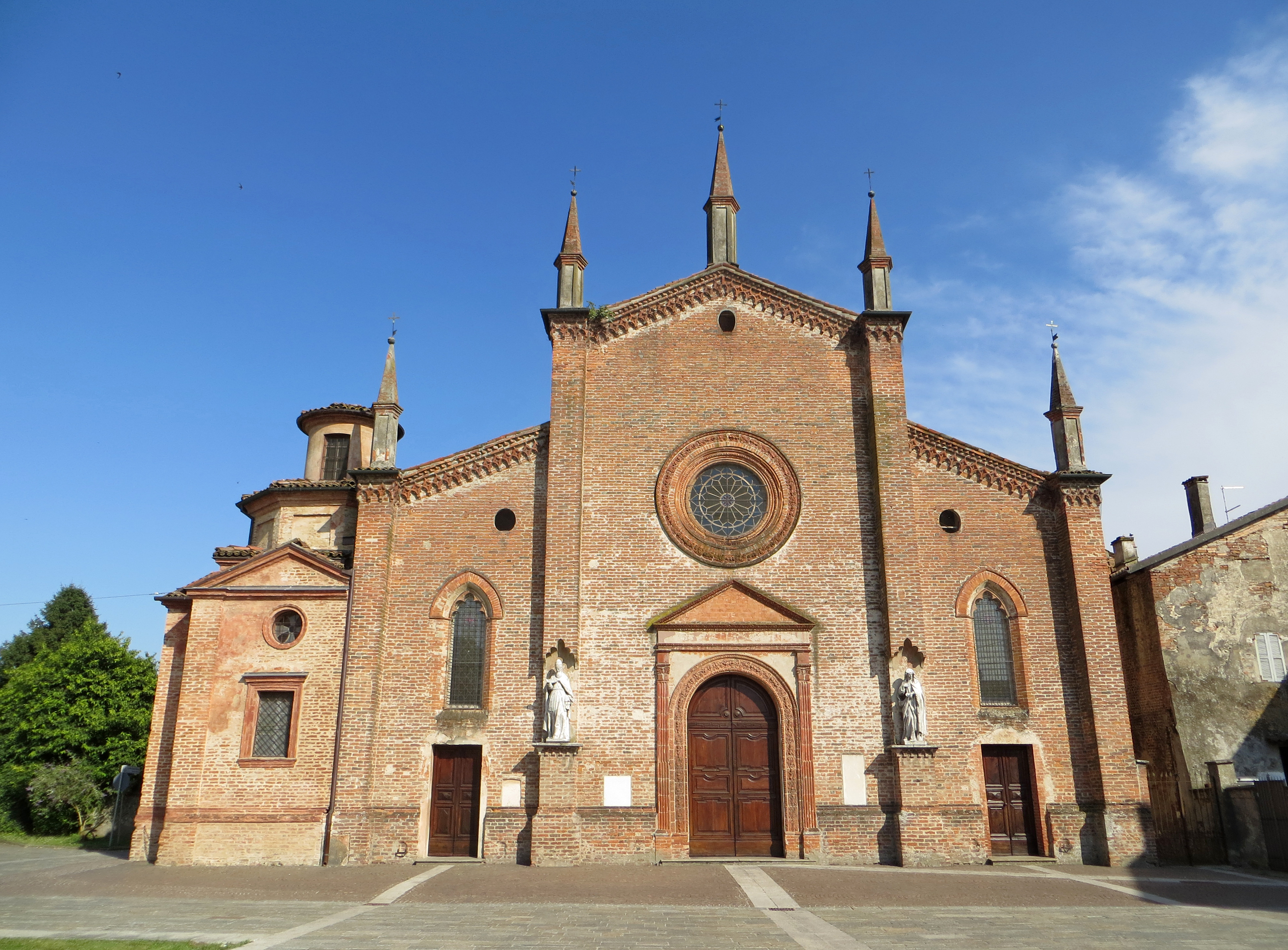
Santi Gervasio e Protasio

Zibello is a town in the Province of Parma in the Italian region Emilia-Romagna, located about 110 kilometres (68 mi) northwest of Bologna and about 30 kilometres (19 mi) northwest of Parma. It was an independent comune until 1 January 2016, when it merged with Polesine Parmense to form the new comune of Polesine Zibello.

The town is also known for the production of culatello di Zibello.

Zibello is a member of Cittaslow.
