= Prosciutto =

Italian dry-cured ham that is thinly sliced and served uncooked

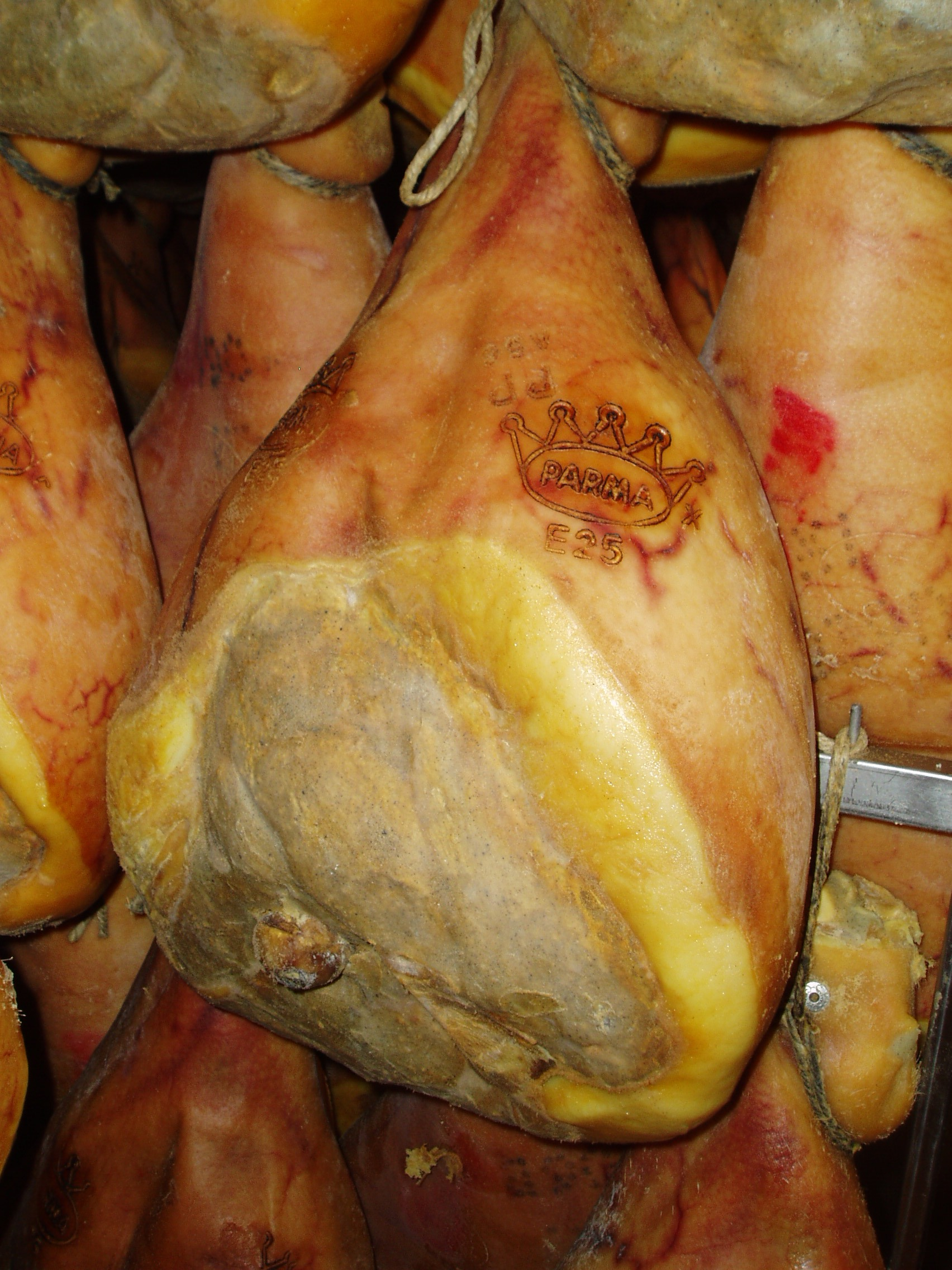
- Prosciutto di Parma
- Alternative names: Prosciutto crudo
- Type: Ham
- Place of origin: Italy

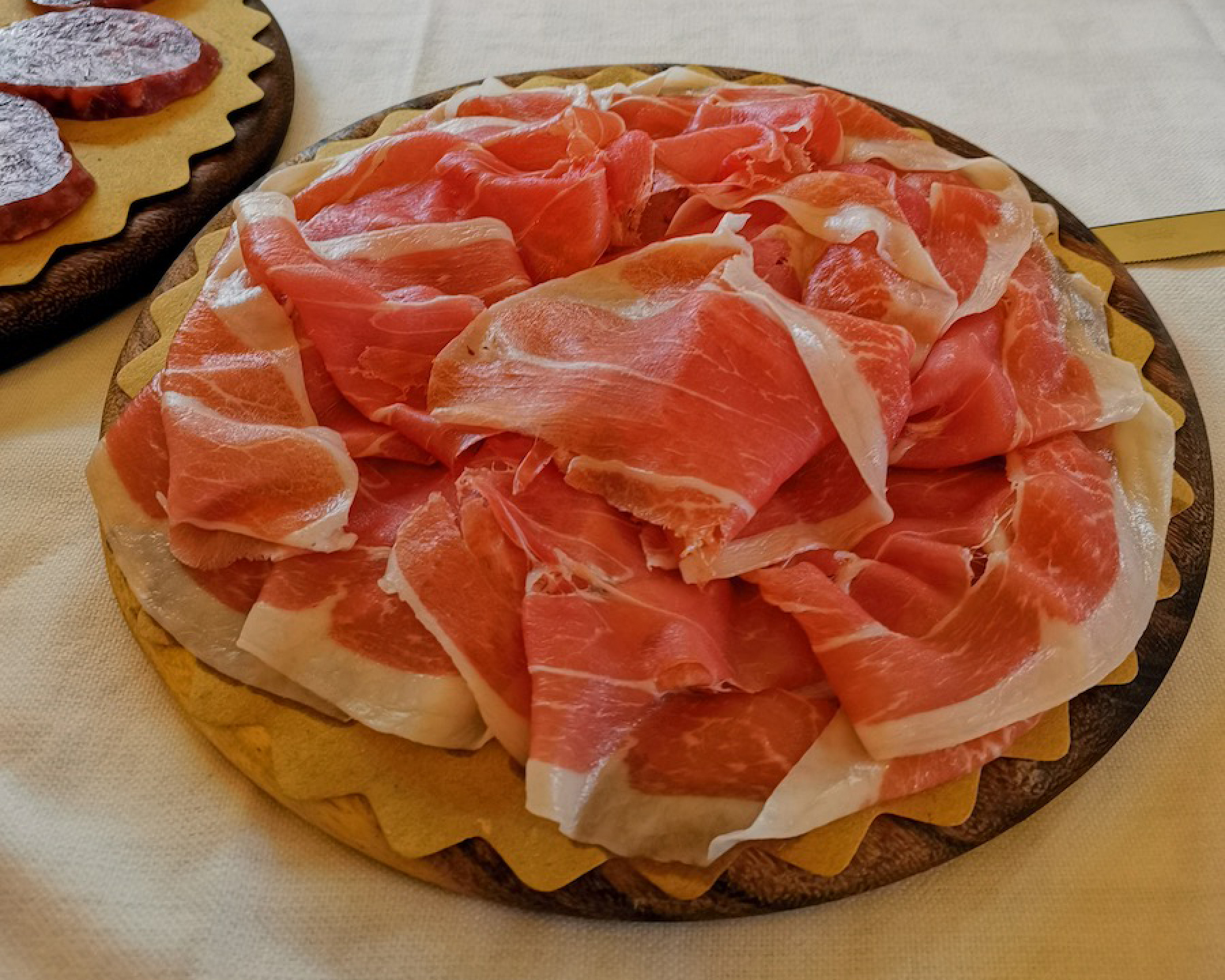
Prosciutto di Parma

Prosciutto (/prəˈʃuːtoʊ, proʊˈ-/ prə-SHOO-toh, proh-; Italian: [proʃˈʃutto]), also known as prosciutto crudo, is an uncooked, unsmoked, and dry-cured ham. It is usually served thinly sliced.

Several regions in Italy have their own variations of prosciutto crudo, each with degrees of protected status, but the most prized are Prosciutto di Parma DOP, from Emilia-Romagna, and Prosciutto di San Daniele DOP, from Friuli-Venezia Giulia. Unlike speck (Speck Alto Adige) from the South Tyrol region, prosciutto is not smoked. There is also a tradition of making prosciutto in southern Switzerland.

In Italian, prosciutto is the ordinary word for "ham", and is therefore used in Italy for every type of ham, including the dry-cured type (prosciutto crudo or simply crudo) and the cooked type (prosciutto cotto). In English-speaking countries, "prosciutto" usually means Italian prosciutto crudo or similar uncooked dry-cured hams made elsewhere, and usually does not include any other types. However, since the word prosciutto is not protected, cooked ham may legally be, and in practice is, sometimes sold as prosciutto in English-speaking regions (usually under the name prosciutto cotto, and usually from Italy or made in the Italian style).

== Etymology ==
The word prosciutto derives from Italian asciutto (lit. 'dry'), with prefix substitution, or from Vulgar Latin pro (before) + exsuctus (past participle of exsugere, 'to suck out [the moisture]'); the Portuguese presunto has the same etymology. It is similar to the modern Italian verb prosciugare ('to dry thoroughly'; from Latin pro + exsucare ('to extract the juices from')).

== History ==
The history of prosciutto begins in pre-Roman times in the region of Friuli-Venezia Giulia. Archaeological evidence of pig farming dates back from the 11th and 8th centuries BC. Celts settled the area around 600 BC, changed the land and water use, and bred pigs for meat. The practice became more organised after their first contact with the Roman Empire (221 BC), as pork meat was a favourite in the Roman diet. The ancient Romans recognised that the local factors of low humidity, ventilation, and a hilly piedmont climate allowed for superior meat preservation, marking the origins of the specialized curing method based on the region's microclimate.

== Manufacture ==
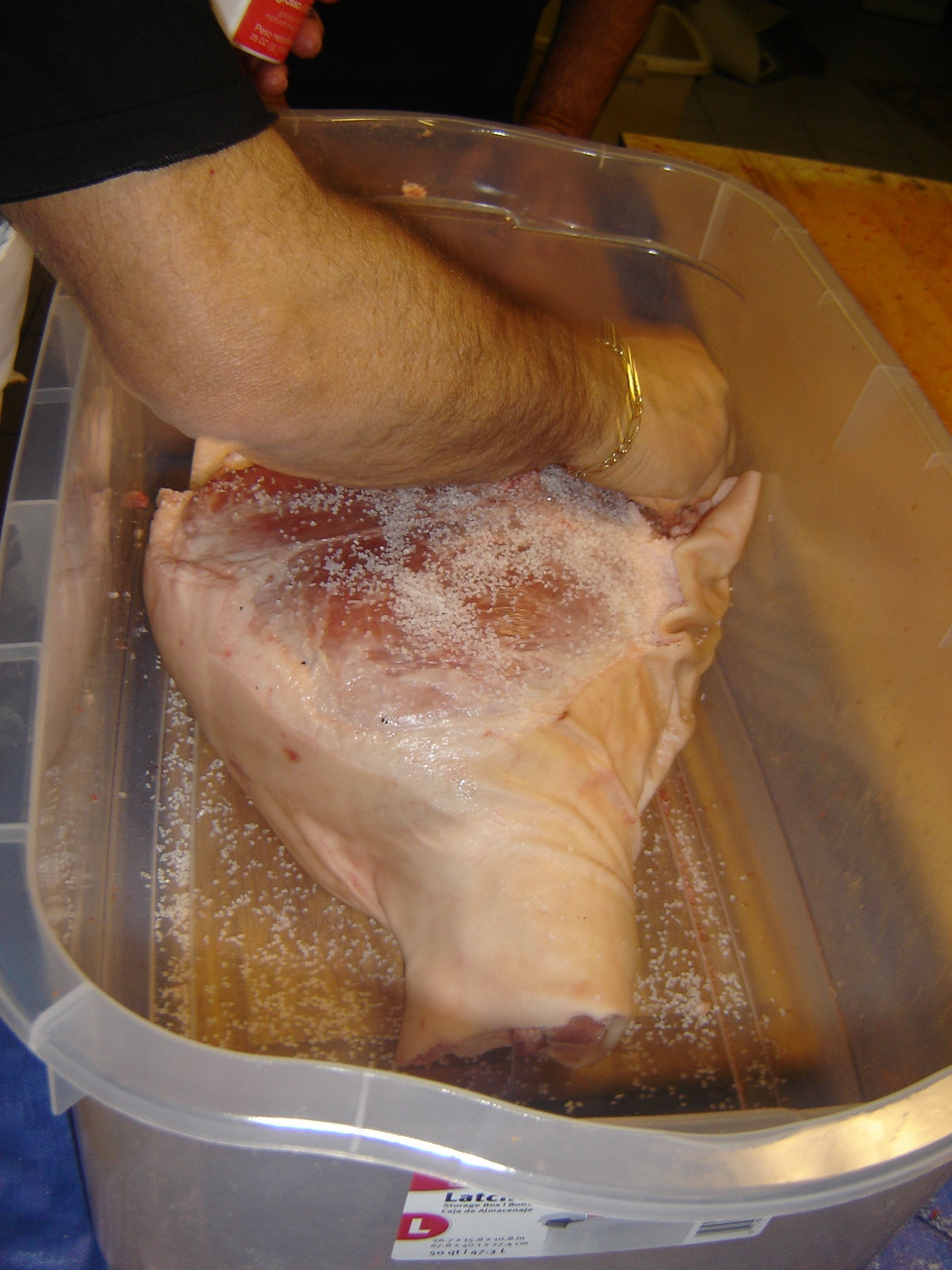
Salt being added to a pork leg

Prosciutto is made from either a pig's or a wild boar's hind leg or thigh, and the word "prosciutto" in its narrow sense means only this specific product. Prosciutto may also be made using the hind leg of other animals, in which case the name of the animal is included in the name of the product, for example prosciutto di agnello (lit. 'lamb ham'). The process of making prosciutto can take from nine months to three years, depending on the size of the ham.

A writer on Italian food, Bill Buford, describes talking to an old Italian butcher who says:

When I was young, there was one kind of prosciutto. It was made in the winter, by hand, and aged for two years. It was sweet when you smelled it. A profound perfume. Unmistakable. To age a prosciutto is a subtle business. If it's too warm, the aging process never begins. The meat spoils. If it's too dry, the meat is ruined. It needs to be damp but cool. The summer is too hot. In the winter—that's when you make salumi. Your prosciutto. Your soppressata. Your sausages.

According to the Consortium of Prosciutto di Parma, the only ingredients used to make prosciutto di Parma DOP are sea salt, lard, and the hind leg of pigs. First, the legs are covered in sea salt; the narrower part with salt that is damp, the larger more muscular part with dry salt. The leg is then refrigerated for a week at a temperature from 1°C to 4°C and a humidity level of approximately 80%, after which a second layer of salt is added and refrigeration is continued for two more weeks. Ordinary salt is the only preservative used; the DOP does not allow nitrites and nitrates. The ham is then hung for two to three months in refrigerated, humidity-controlled rooms, after which the remaining salt is rinsed off.

The ham is then hung for about 3 months in cellars, during which the exterior dries out. This drying is corrected later with the application of a mix of minced lard and salt.

Finally, the hams are hung in temperature- and humidity-controlled rooms or cellars for at least 14 months, or up to three years. At the end of this aging process, a needle made from horse bone, which rapidly absorbs the product fragrances, is inserted in different parts of the ham to check the quality of the prosciutto. After the quality check, the hams are branded with the ducal crown symbol.

Non-PDO prosciutto is sometimes cured with sodium nitrite or potassium nitrate, which are generally used in other hams to produce the desired rosy colour and unique flavour, but only sea salt is used in protected designation of origin (PDO) hams. The colour of the ham when sodium nitrite and potassium nitrate are used is produced when nitric oxide reacts with myoglobin to form nitrosomyoglobin; this colour appears more intense as the ham loses water. The nitric oxide required for the nitrosomyoglobin reaction is converted by bacteria from the added nitrite or nitrate.

== European Union–protected designations of origin ==
=== Prosciutto crudo ===
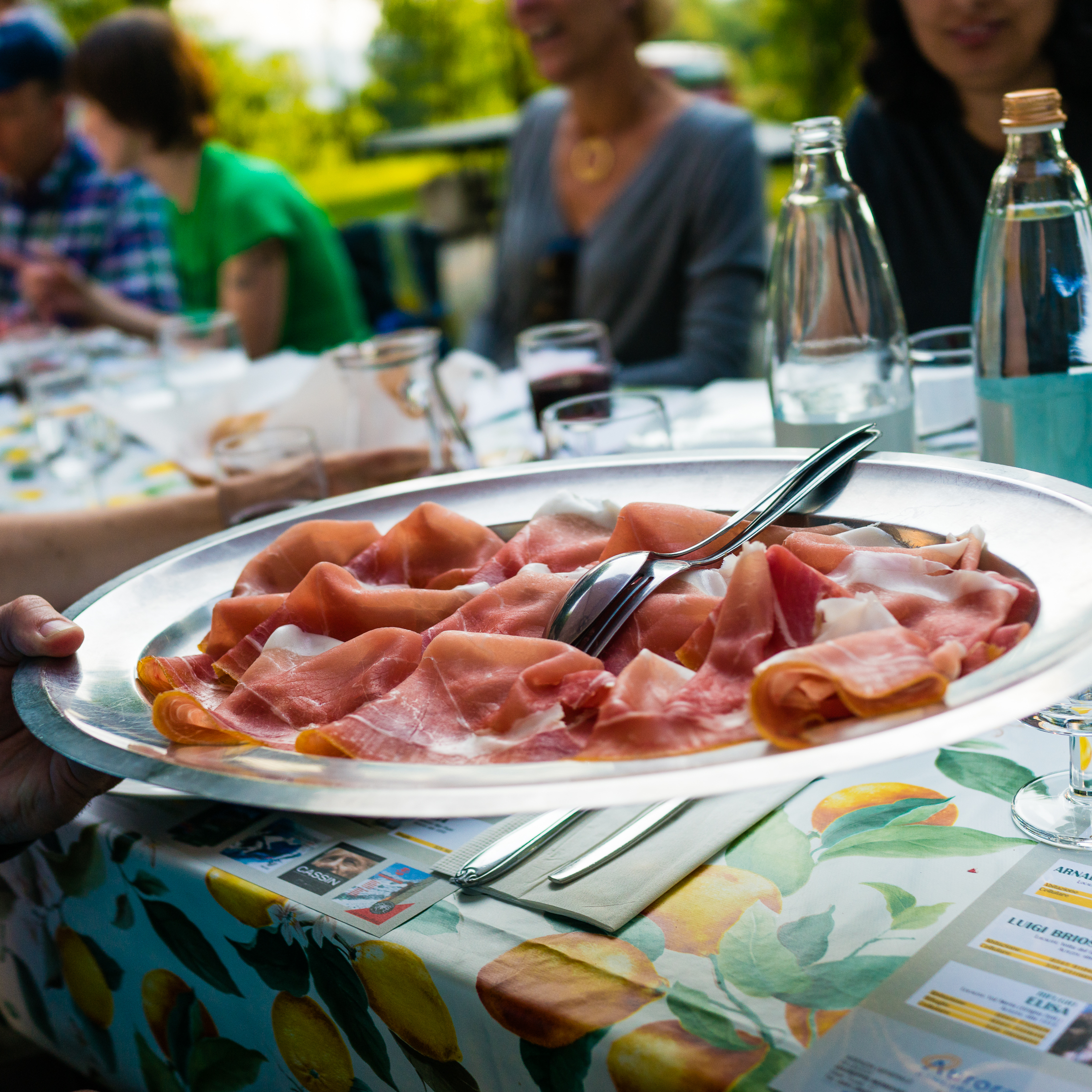
A plate of prosciutto

Under the Common Agricultural Policy of the European Union (EU), certain well-established meat products, including some local prosciutto, are covered by a protected designation of origin (PDO) and other, less stringent designations of geographical origin for traditional specialties. Various regions have their own PDO, whose specifications do not generally require ham from free range pigs. The word prosciutto, used alone or with crudo or cotto, is not a protected term.

The two famous types of Italian prosciutto crudo are: prosciutto crudo di Parma, from Parma, and prosciutto crudo di San Daniele, from the San Daniele del Friuli area, in the Friuli-Venezia Giulia region. Prosciutto di Parma has a slightly nutty flavour from the Parmesan whey that is sometimes added to the pigs' diet. Prosciutto di San Daniele is darker, and sweeter in flavour. For both of them, the product regulations allow salt as the only additive to the meat, prohibiting additives such as nitrite and nitrate that are often used in unprotected products.

European protected designation of origin (PDO) and protected geographical indication (PGI) apply for several prosciutto varieties in Italy, each slightly different in colour, flavour, and texture:

- Prosciutto di Parma, Parma, PDO
- Prosciutto di San Daniele, San Daniele del Friuli, PDO
- Prosciutto di Modena, Modena, PDO
- Prosciutto toscano, Tuscany, PDO
- Prosciutto Veneto Berico-Euganeo (or Prosciutto Veneto), Veneto, PDO
- Prosciutto di Carpegna, near Carpegna, Montefeltro, PDO
- Prosciutto amatriciano, near Amatrice, Lazio, PGI
- Prosciutto di Norcia, Norcia, PGI
- Prosciutto di Sauris, Sauris, PGI
- Prosciutto crudo di Cuneo, Cuneo, PDO
- Valle d'Aosta Jambon de Bosses, Aosta Valley, PDO
- Prosciutto di suino nero dei Nebrodi, Sicily, PDO
- Cinta Senese, Tuscany, PDO
- Prosciutto di Bassiano, Lazio
- Prosciutto di Venticano, Campania
- Prosciutto di Faeto, Apulia
- Prosciutto della Majella, Abruzzo
- Prosciutto di suino nero Casertano, Campania
- Prosciutto crudo dell'Irpinia, Campania

=== Culatello ===
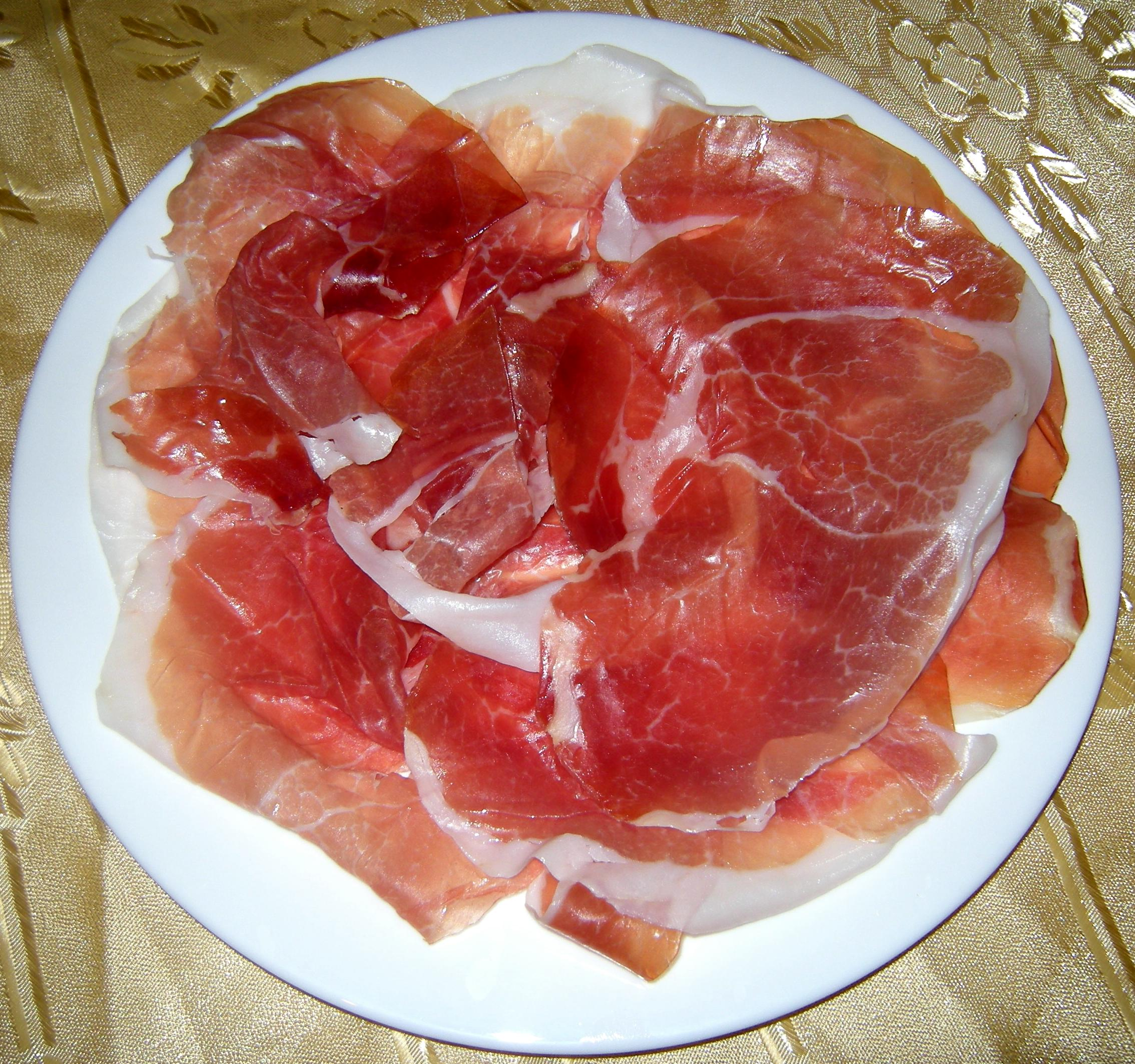
Culaccia di Parma

Culatello con cotenna is similar to prosciutto, but is made from the filet or loin of the hind leg. It is aged in a cow or pig's bladder as a casing to prevent spoilage and contamination. Culatello di Zibello possesses PDO status. It is commonly served as an appetizer (antipasto).

Strolghino is a salami prepared from leftover cuts of culatello.

=== Pršut ===
Prosciutto, locally called pršut, is produced in Serbia and Montenegro, Bosnia and Herzegovina, Slovenia (especially the Karst Plateau and the Vipava Valley), and Croatia (Dalmatia, the island of Krk, and Istria). Pršut from Dalmatia and Herzegovina are smoked, unlike the Italian product, while that from Slovenia, Istria, and Krk is not smoked. The mountain village of Njeguši, in Montenegro, produces the smoked njeguški pršut.

The following types of pršut have a protected status in the European Union and the UK:

Pršut with PGI and PDO
Country	Geographical Area	Name	Geographical Indication	Year of registration
Croatia	part of Dalmatia	Dalmatinski pršut	PGI	2016
Croatia	Šibenik-Knin County	Drniški pršut	PGI	2015
Croatia and Slovenia	part of Istria	Istarski pršut / Istrski pršut	PDO	2015
Slovenia	part of the Kras	Kraški pršut	PGI	2012
Croatia	Krk	Krčki pršut	PGI	2015

== See also ==
- List of hams
- List of dried foods
- List of smoked foods
- Jamón serrano – Spanish dry-cured ham
- Jamón ibérico – type of cured pork leg product
- Presunto – Portuguese dry-cured ham
