= Salumi =

Italian cured meat products usually made from pork

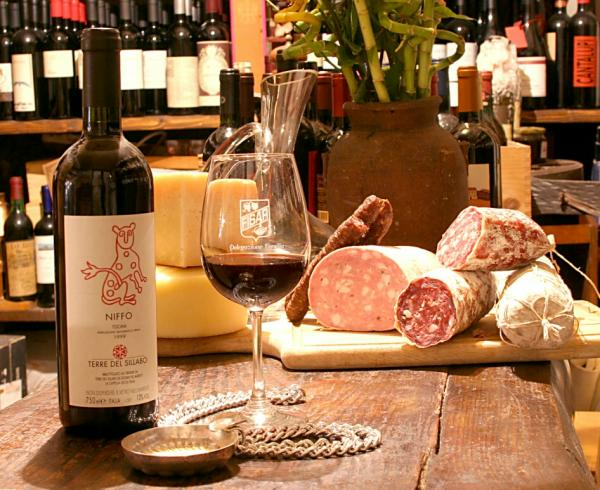
Italian wine and salumi

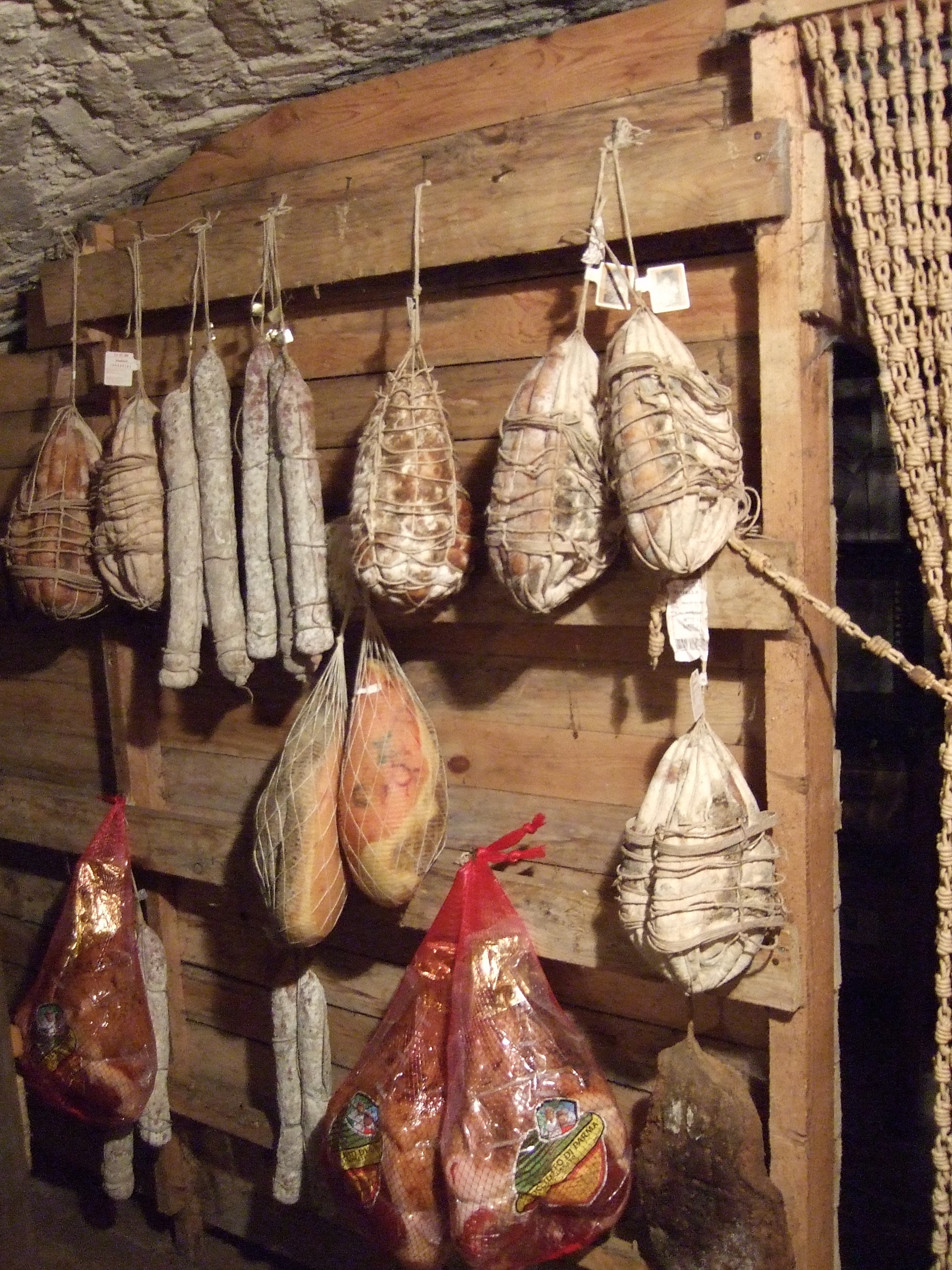
Aging salumi

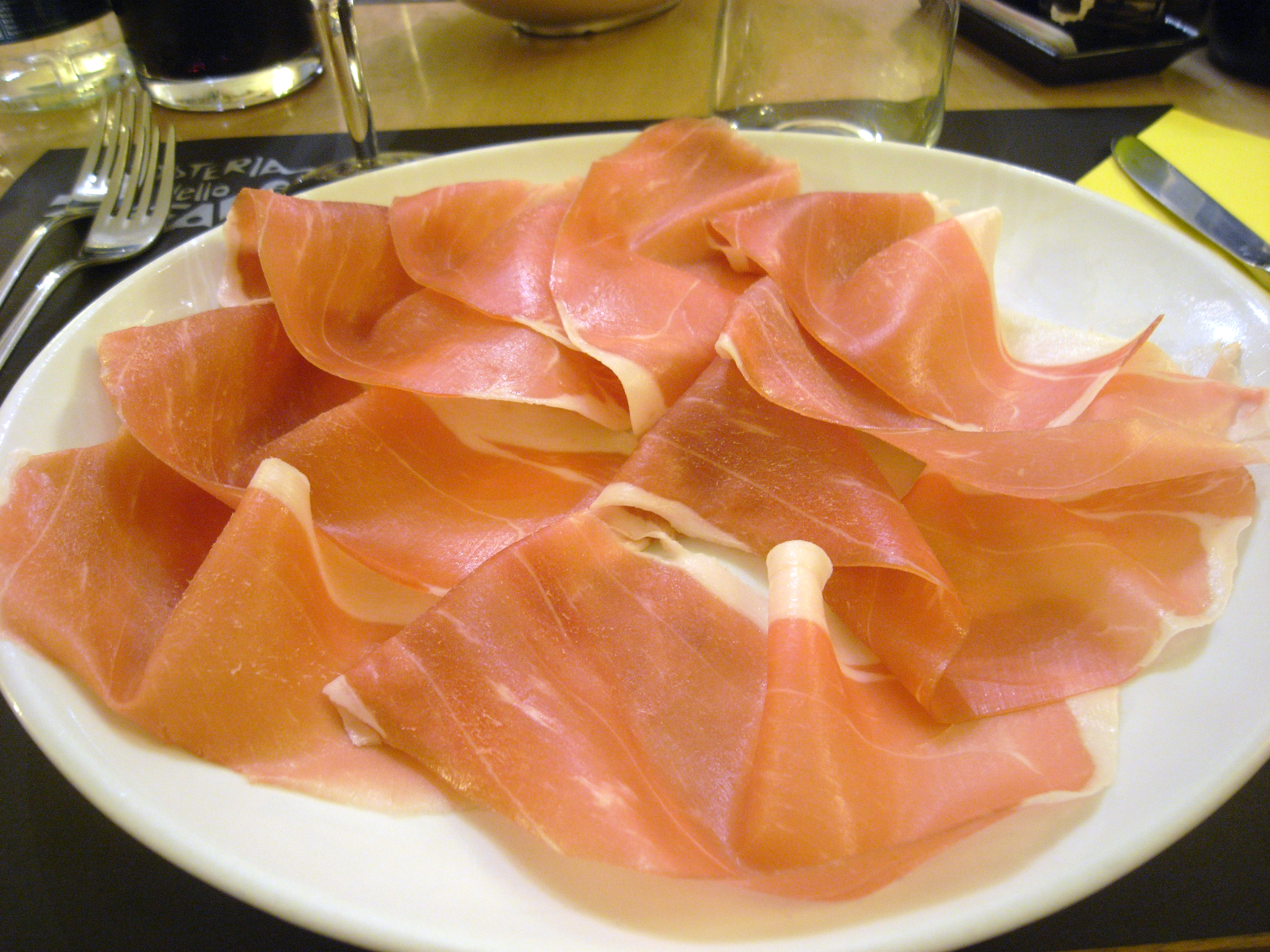
Prosciutto di Parma

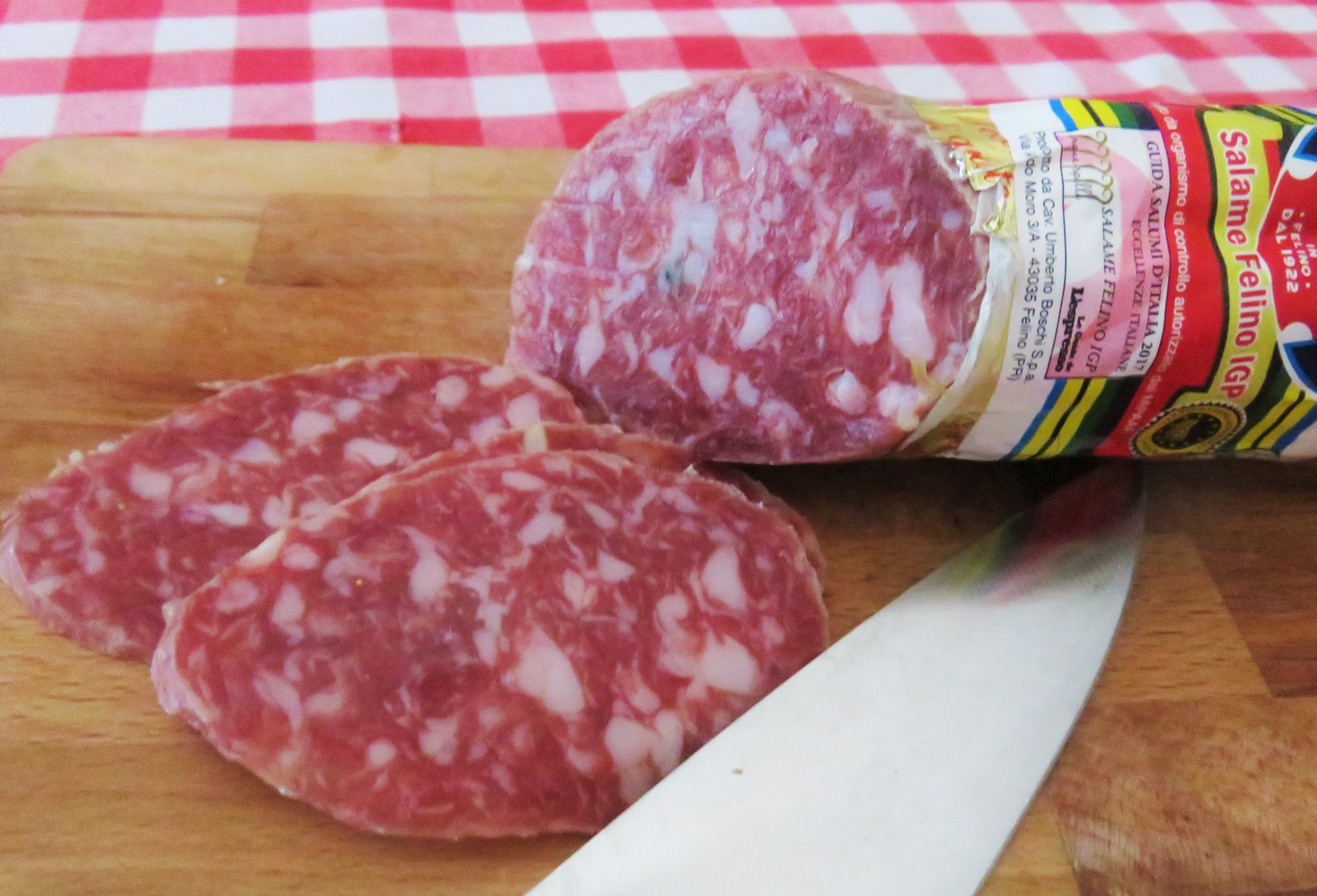
Salame Felino

Salumi (sing.: salume, pronounced [saˈluːme]) are Italian meat products typical of an antipasto, predominantly made from pork and cured. They also include bresaola, which is made from beef, and some cooked products, such as mortadella.

The word salume, 'salted meat', derives from the Latin sal, 'salt'.

Salumi include:

- Prosciutto – dry-cured ham, thinly sliced and served uncooked (prosciutto crudo)
  - Prosciutto di Parma
  - Prosciutto di San Daniele
  - Speck Alto Adige – dry-cured ham from South Tyrol, Italy
  - Culatello
- Capocollo, also known as coppa or capicola – Italian and French pork cold cut
- Bresaola – air-dried and salted beef
- Cotechino – slow cooked pork sausage
  - Cotechino Modena – fresh pork sausage from Modena
- Guanciale – prepared with pork jowl or cheek
- Lardo – Italian cured and seasoned strips of pig fat
- Lonza and lonzino – salumi made from cured pork loin
- Mortadella – sausage made from finely ground cured pork
- 'Nduja – Calabrian spicy, spreadable pork sausage
- Pancetta – made from pork belly meat
- Salami – cured sausage, fermented and air-dried meat
  - Salame Felino – traditionally produced in Felino and other towns in the province of Parma, qualifies as a prodotto agroalimentare tradizionale (PAT)
  - Salame genovese di Sant'Olcese
  - Soppressata – dry salami
  - Strolghino – thin, lean cured sausage
  - Ciauscolo – smoked and dry-cured sausage from Marche and Umbria
  - Ventricina – dry fermented pork sausage from Abruzzo

== See also ==
- List of sausages
- List of dried foods
- Charcuterie – branch of cooking of prepared meat products, primarily from pork
- Salumeria – producer and/or vendor of cured pork (salume)
