= Ministry of Agriculture, Food Sovereignty and Forests =

Government ministry of Italy

- Ministero dell'agricoltura, della sovranità alimentare e delle foreste MASAF
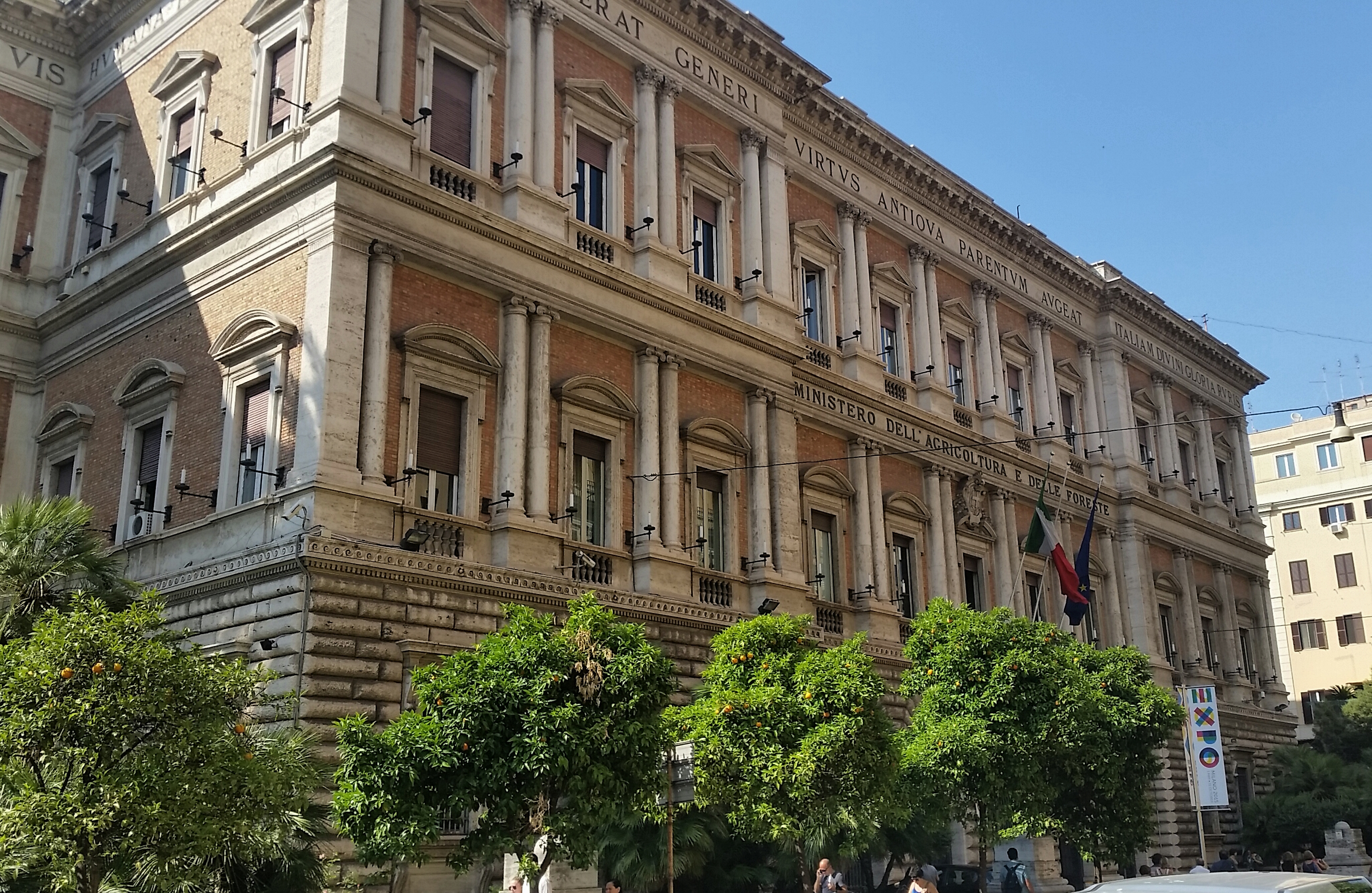
- Headquarters of the Ministry in Via XX Settembre, Rome

Agency overview
- Formed: 1946
- Jurisdiction: Council of Ministers of Italy
- Headquarters: 20 via XX Settembre, Rome, Italy
- Minister responsible: Francesco Lollobrigida, Minister of Agriculture, Food Sovereignty and Forests
- Website: www.politicheagricole.it

The Ministry of Agriculture, Food Sovereignty and Forests (Italian: Ministero dell'agricoltura, della sovranità alimentare e delle foreste), or MASAF, is an Italian government department.

It was formed in 1946 as the Ministero dell'Agricoltura e delle Foreste ("Ministry of Agriculture and Forests"), and following the referendum of 1993 became the Ministero per il Coordinamento delle Politiche Agricole ("Ministry for Co-ordination of Agricultural Policies"). It was reconstituted in the same year as the Ministero delle Risorse Agricole, Alimentari e Forestali ("Ministry of Agricultural, Food and Forestry Resources") in 2006 and assumed the current form in 2022, after the formation of the Meloni government.

The Ministry, based at the Palazzo dell'Agricoltura in Rome, produces and coordinates government policy on agriculture, forests, food and fisheries at national, European and international levels.

The current Minister of Agriculture, Food Sovereignty and Forests is Francesco Lollobrigida.

== Organisation ==
=== Ministry ===
- Segreteria Particolare del Ministro
- Servizio di Controllo Interno
- Ufficio di Gabinetto
  - Ufficio del Portavoce del Ministro
  - Segreteria Tecnica del Ministro
  - Ufficio Legislativo
  - Ufficio Rapporti Internazionali
  - Consigliere Diplomatico
  - Ufficio Studi
  - Commissario ad Acta ex Agensud

=== Comando Carabinieri Politiche Agricole ===
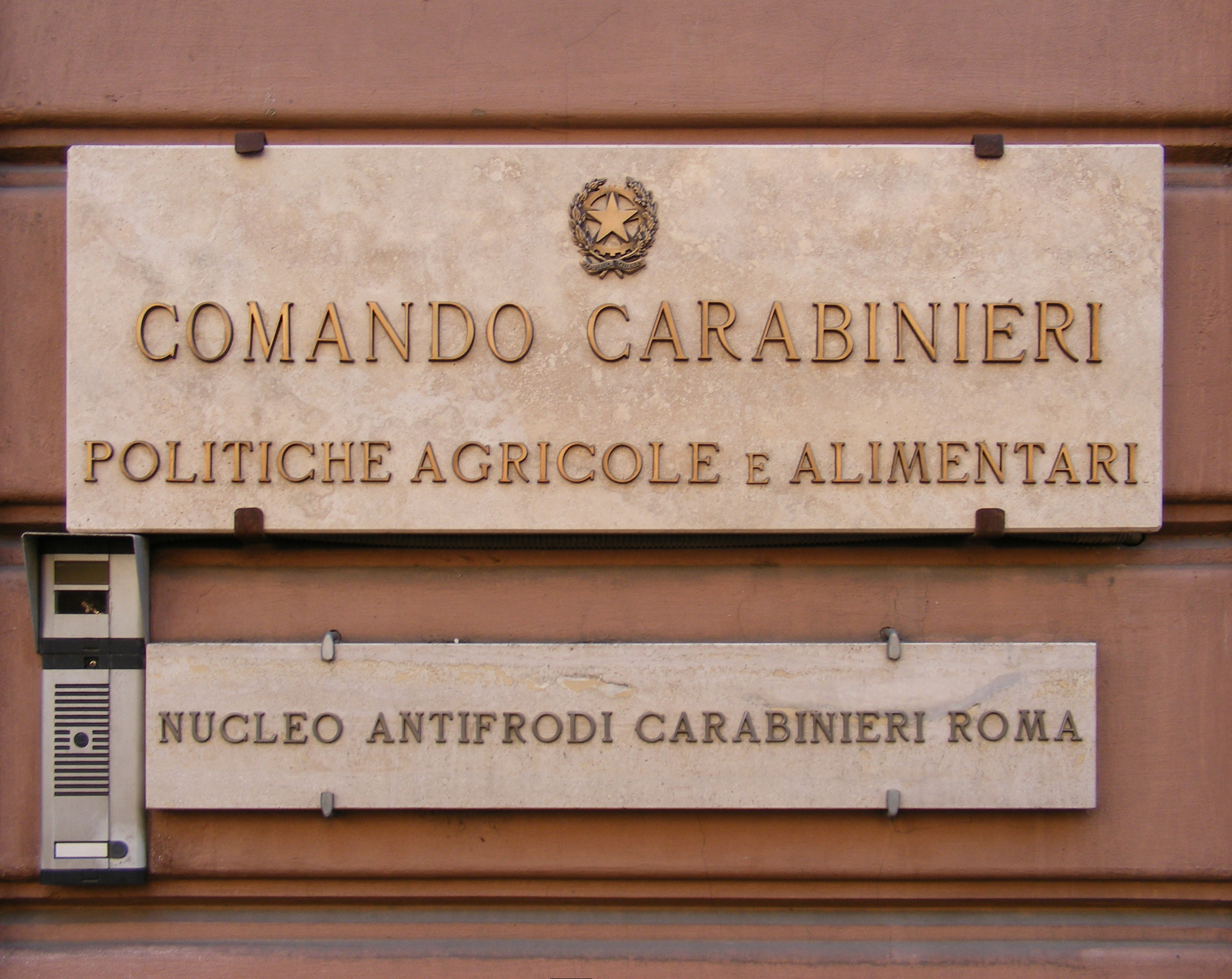
Comando Carabinieri - Politiche Agricole e Alimentari sign.

The Comando Carabinieri Politiche Agricole is the department of the Arma dei Carabinieri which develops extraordinary controls on :

1. supply and use of subsidies in the agricultural, fisheries and aquaculture sectors;
2. withdrawing and sale of food products, including helping the poor and those in developing countries

=== Dipartimento delle Filiere Agricole e Agroalimentari (Di.F.Ag.) ===
==== Direzione Generale delle Politiche Agricole (Pol.Agr.) ====
- Pol. Agr. I - Affari Generali e Rapporti con il Dipartimento
- Pol. Agr. II - Linee Generali di Politica Agricola
- Pol. Agr. III - Settore del Lattiero-Caseario
- Pol. Agr. IV - Settore del Vino e dei Prodotti Vitivinicoli
- Pol. Agr. V - Settore dei Prodotti Ortofrutticoli e del Florovivaismo
- Pol. Agr. VI - Settore dell'Olio di Oliva
- Pol. Agr. VII - Settore dei Prodotti Zootecnici
- Pol. Agr. VIII - Settore dei Cereali, dello Zucchero e del Tabacco
- Pol. Agr. IX - Controlli FEOGA e Riconoscimento degli Organismi Pagatori

==== Direzione Generale della Trasformazione Agroalimentare e dei Mercati (Tr.Agr.) ====
- Tr. Agr. I - Affari Generali e Rapporti con il Dipartimento
- Tr. Agr. II - Regole di Concorrenza
- Tr. Agr. III - Politiche Agroalimentari
- Tr. Agr. IV - Settore Agroindustriale
- Tr. Agr. V - Accordi di Filiera

==== Direzione Generale della Pesca Marittima e dell'Acquacoltura (Pe.M.Acq.) ====
- Pe. M. Aqu. I - Affari Generali e Rapporti con il Dipartimento
- Pe. M. Aqu. II - Rapporti Internazionali
- Pe. M. Aqu. III - Conservazione Risorse Interne
- Pe. M. Aqu. IV - Piano Triennale della Pesca
- Pe. M. Aqu. V - Gestione ed Erogazione dei Fondi Comunitari
- Pe. M. Aqu. VI - Risorse Esterne, Controllo e Vigilanza

=== Corpo Forestale dello Stato ===
Corpo Forestale dello Stato (CFS; Italian for State Forestry Department)

== Connected bodies ==
- Agenzia per le Erogazioni in Agricoltura
- Istituto Nazionale di Economia Agraria
- Unione Nazionale Incremento Razze Equine
- Istituto di Servizi per Mercato Agricolo Alimentare
- Istituto Nazionale per gli Alimenti e la Nutrizione
