= Jambon sec des Ardennes =

Certification mark for dry-cured hams

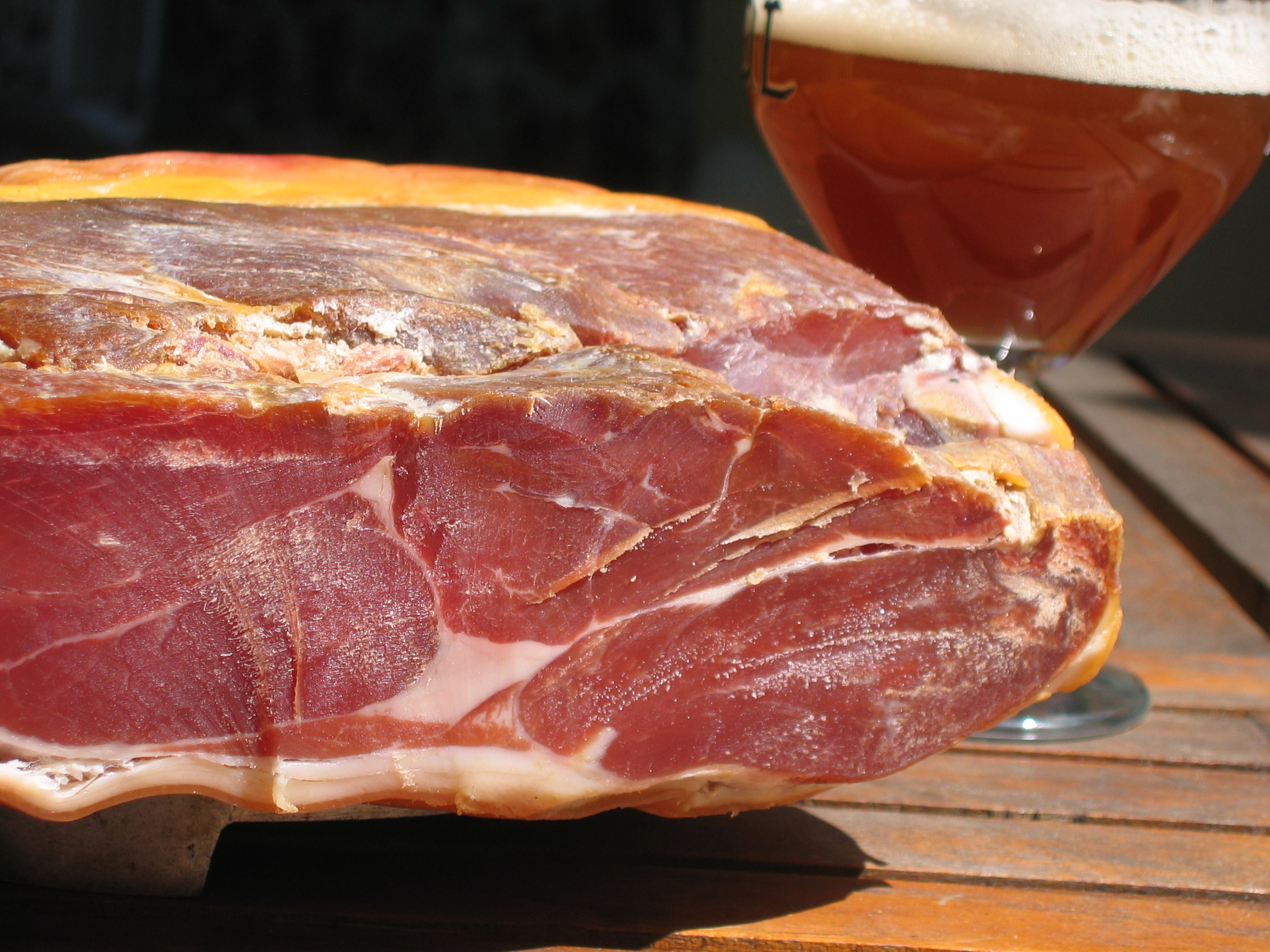
- Ardennes dry-cured ham
- Type: Delicatessen
- Course: Entrée or main course
- Place of origin: Ardennes department
- Other information: Certified by the Confrérie du Jambon sec d'Ardennes since 1985; Listed protected geographical indication since 2015

The Jambon sec des Ardennes (lit. French for Ardennes dry-cured ham) is the collective certification mark for dry-cured hams from the French department of the Ardennes, made from pigs' legs purchased from local farmers and processed by salting, drying and aging.

This food processing technique is inspired by the farmhouse hams that have always been produced by Ardennes farmers.

The brand and trade of this charcuterie were developed over the last thirty years of the 20th century, thanks to the impetus of a charcuterie craftsman, Maurice Roffidal, and then to a confraternity of professional charcuterie processors and gastronomes from the Ardennes.

Since 2009, the industry, made up of farmers, charcutiers, associations and local authorities, has been working to gain recognition for this transformation. In 2015, the European Commission registered the geographical indication marks "Jambon sec des Ardennes - Noix de Jambon sec des Ardennes" as PGIs.

Companies in the Jambon sec des Ardennes sector remain relatively modest in size. The volume of just under one hundred tonnes sold in France and neighbouring countries represents a small proportion of annual consumption in these countries.

Jambon sec des Ardennes should be distinguished from Jambon d'Ardenne, produced in Belgium and often smoked.

== History ==
In the 19th century, pig farming in the Ardennes was highlighted by several authors for its importance, and for the quality of the resulting products. Leandre-Moïse Lombard, in his 1855 book, Sur le Cuisinier et le Médecin, ranks pigs from the Ardennes among "the most renowned French pigs". This is still the case a century later, according to Henry Clos Jouve.

As early as 1793, ham from the Ardennes was cited as a speciality of the département, in Vouziers, in the price tables drawn up in accordance with the "general maximum law". Revolutionary period or not, this product became a local benchmark, reaching as far as the Île-de-France region in the 19th century. In 1866, the agronomist Gustave Heuzé, professor at the École nationale d’agriculture de Grignon, stated that "the most esteemed French hams are prepared in the departments of the Lower Pyrenees, Lower and Upper Rhine, Meuse, Moselle, Ardennes and Vosges". The specialty was included in the Olida catalog when the company was still just a Parisian boutique selling gourmet specialties, before becoming a charcuterie manufacturer. It features prominently in Champagne-Ardenne receptions. For example, this specialty was part of the menu at the banquet for the inauguration of the railway line in Raucourt on August 21, 1898, by the French Minister of Public Works, Louis Charles Tillaye. The same was true for the inauguration of the new Nouzonville town hall on November 9, 1924. In 1930, it still appeared under the name of Porcien hams on the gastronomic menu of Alain Bourguignon, director of the Écu de France restaurant on rue de Strasbourg in Paris.

In 1985, the Confrérie du Jambon sec d'Ardennes was founded, bringing together charcuterie and catering professionals, tasters and gastronomes, to raise awareness of the product. In 1988, Jambon sec des Ardennes and Noix de Jambon sec des Ardennes were awarded an official sign of superior quality and origin, a regional agricultural label (homologation no. 18-88 of the regional label Ardennes de France). Protected Geographical Indication (PGI) commercial protection was obtained in October 2001. However, the abolition of regional labels in France in 2003 led to the label being put on hold. The labeling process was relaunched in 2010, to be completed in 2015.

In 2000, the Jambon sec des Ardennes was also chosen by Gilles Pudlowski when he selected fifty local products which, in his opinion, resisted the general standardization of foodstuffs, for his book Les trésors gourmands de la France. For this publication, the food critic met Maurice Roffidal, a charcutier in Haybes, who revived the traditional preparation of dry-cured ham in the French Ardennes, taking over his uncle's small business in 1972. Since then, this craftsman has passed on his passion to a new generation, and other colleagues have taken care to pass on the torch in the same way.

=== Family production and processing methods ===
Family breeding and processing is the original method. In the 19th century and the first half of the 20th century, meat consumption was rarer in the Ardennes than it is today. However, one meat stood out from the rest for its more regular consumption: pork. "In popular cuisine, the pig is king. For a long time," wrote Dr. Octave Guelliot in 1931, "it was the only meat in the peasant's diet. Pig breeding was a family affair. Each family killed one or two pigs a year, and consumed the meat throughout the year, dried and hung from the kitchen and attic beams.

The death of the pig was an event for which an occasional but skilled slayer was called in. The "killer" also knew how to butcher. Indeed, the charbonnée, which corresponds to the fillet and cutlet, was shared with friends and neighbors. Each other piece was then carefully cut up, prepared, salted and sprinkled with peppers and spices. Then, "a month and a half later", according to Jacques Lambert, quoting a chronicler of the village of Sainte-Vaubourg, Jules Lefranc, "the pig was desalted and, using harts (wicker strands), hams and bacon quarters were hung in the kitchen, next to small logs cut to length and resting by their ends on the cloïettes (this is the name given to two small pieces of wood, two shanks for example, approximately 2 meters long, placed parallel to the ceiling and supported by hooks or cleats glued to two adjacent beams); the wicker racks known as platelets were placed on the cloettes). The salt melted and flooded the pavement, but this only lasted a few days. A few weeks later, the meat was dried and returned to the salting room, cleaned and transported to the attic, where it was simply placed on a bed of straw". Thanks to the region's climate, drying and curing were slow and gradual. These conditions enabled the development and blossoming of fragrances and flavors in the best possible conditions.

=== Artisanal processing for the market ===
Farm-based production and processing within rural families became progressively rarer during the 20th century, with the creation of slaughterhouses and changes in regulations governing the slaughter of animals. But at the same time, by the end of the nineteenth century, charcuterie had developed, particularly in the towns of the Ardennes, but also, more surprisingly, in smaller villages such as Haybes and Hargnies, with dry-cured ham as the main product. These charcuterie craftsmen organized tours, by cart, bus or train, to deliver throughout the Meuse and Semoy valleys, an area characterized by a denser, more urban and more working-class population than the rest of the Ardennes department. They also had a clientele of regulars, including Parisian expatriates, who, when passing through the country, would take a few specialties with them in their luggage. In 1939, the village of Hargnies was home to around 15 charcutiers. This charcutier tradition has survived and passed on its manufacturing secrets from generation to generation, even if it was confronted, between the wars and during the "Trente Glorieuses", with the emergence of a competing industry, delivering a more standardized production, under the impetus of companies such as Olida or Jean Caby.

== The Jambon sec des Ardennes marketing network ==
=== Processing methods for Ardennes dry-cured ham ===
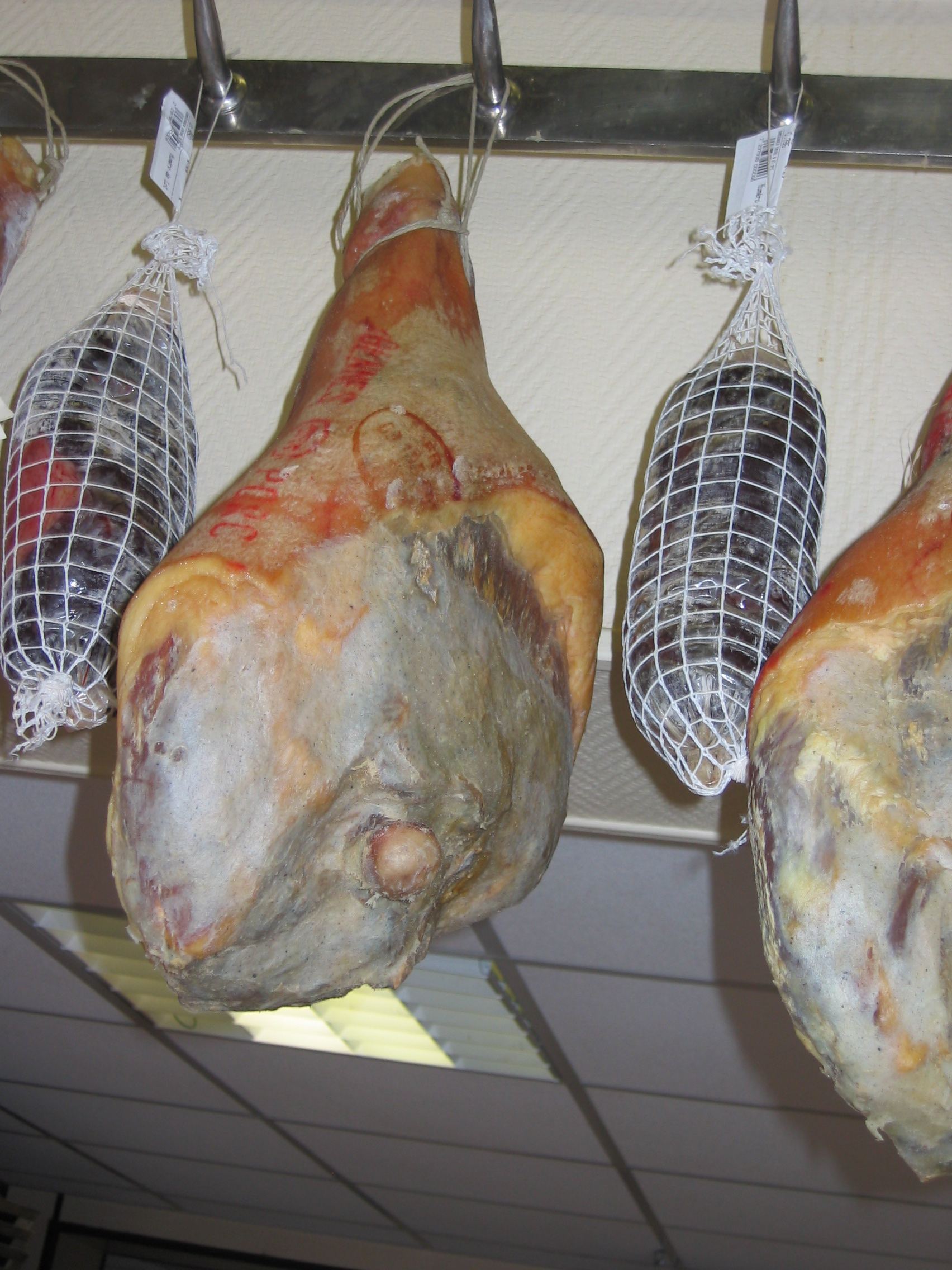
Hams and inner pieces of the Ham of the Ardennes after aging, entering the market.

There are three stages in the processing of Jambon des Ardennes: salting, drying and aging. In his recommendations on how to proceed, Maurice Roffidal places particular emphasis on massage and manual rubbing during salting, and on the duration of the aging period. The Institut National de l'Origine et de la Qualité (National Institute of Origin and Quality) includes these points on the product sheet for the protected geographical indication.

To begin with, after cutting and trimming, the fresh pork leg is massaged and then hand-rubbed with fine salt, mixed with a few spices. The massage draws residual blood out of the veins and arteries, contributing to the red hue of the final ham. When it comes to rubbing, each operator has his own way of proceeding and his own secrets, concerning the spices used or the number of rubs, for example, to encourage the development of aromas, take into account the weight of the ham and keep the salt content low. This stage lasts one or several days, depending on the number of rubs.

The aim of drying is then to "stabilize" the meat and homogenize the amount of salt in the ham, in part by reproducing the natural drying conditions of yesteryear, in attics during the winter. The first dryers are low-temperature, between 3 and 4 °C, with a humidity level of over 80%. Then the temperature rises to around 10 °C. This stage lasts around 3 months.

The last and longest stage, aging, removes the moisture from the ham. The drier the ham, the more concentrated its flavor. Before aging, the ham is breaded, i.e. covered on the surface with a kind of lard, the fat from the pig's belly, to prevent the surface from drying out too quickly and forming a crust. Again, breading is done by hand. The ham is then hung in a room where cycles of hot and cold air are alternated, recreating the natural climatic conditions traditionally found in farm drying sheds. Aging can last from 7 to 12 months.

Maurice Roffidal, the man behind the creation of this salted product, also insists on the importance of the "raw material" at the start of the process. He selected the pigs himself, favoring large white or piétrain breeds, raised in semi-mountainous areas and fed mainly on cereals. The Institut national de l'origine et de la qualité, or INAO, lists the whole of the Ardennes department as a breeding zone, bearing in mind that this department now has a low density of pig farms, the number of animals having been divided by four compared to the beginning of the 20th century. The INAO naturally excludes the use of frozen meat, reiterates the requirement for cereal feed during rearing, and refers to the Label Rouge specifications for meat quality.

=== Marketing of Ardennes dry-cured ham ===
A fresh leg weighs around 9 or 10 kg, and a cured ham weighs between 6 and 7 kg, with bone. In 1995, hams and inner pieces of the ham under the Ardennes de France label represented a volume of 4,000 pieces per year. Today, this figure has more than doubled. Around ten charcutiers produce under this label, and two of the main artisanal companies, one in Haybes (Maurice Roffidal's estate) at the tip of the French Ardennes, and the other in La Francheville, near Charleville-Mézières, together produce between 8,000 and 10,000 pieces a year. This production is still artisanal in nature. The annual tonnage of dry-cured ham produced in the Ardennes, estimated at between 80 and 100 tonnes, should be compared with the 60,000 tonnes consumed in France, including 11,600 tonnes of Jambon Aoste, produced by the Aoste industrial group, and 9,500 tonnes of Bayonne ham, a speciality of the Adour basin which, like dry-cured ham from the Ardennes, has a protected geographical indication.

French consumption of dry-cured ham exceeds production, and the country is therefore an importer. In Europe, Italian processing predominates, with well-known dry cured meats such as Parma ham and Vallée d'Aoste Jambon de Bosses, the Speck Alto Adige brand, and so on. Annual production of Parma ham, for example, represents between 9 and 10 million pieces a year, compared with 4,000 pieces of Jambon des Ardennes. Jambon des Ardennes production is therefore relatively small in volume, and its marketing is virtually ignored by mass retailers. This situation may change, however, as a result of the interest shown by supermarkets in so-called "terroir" (locally produced) products, and the willingness of certain processors to target these marketing channels.

To be able to slice a ham, it must first be boned. This is the form in which it is generally marketed. Using a special knife, the bone is carefully removed from the meat. The ham is then sewn back together and placed in a press to regain its oval shape. It is also possible to present the three muscles making up each ham separately for sale: the top muscle, the bottom muscle and the round fillet. The bottom and round fillet are cased and presented in a rounded, elongated shape. The ham noix (the piece of the inside of the ham) are filleted and pear-shaped. These ham noix are appreciated for their finesse and low fat content. They weigh around 3 kg for large ones and 800 g for small ones. They are produced more quickly than whole hams, as they weigh less: from 45 to 120 days.

=== Gastronomic characteristics of Ardennes dry-cured ham ===
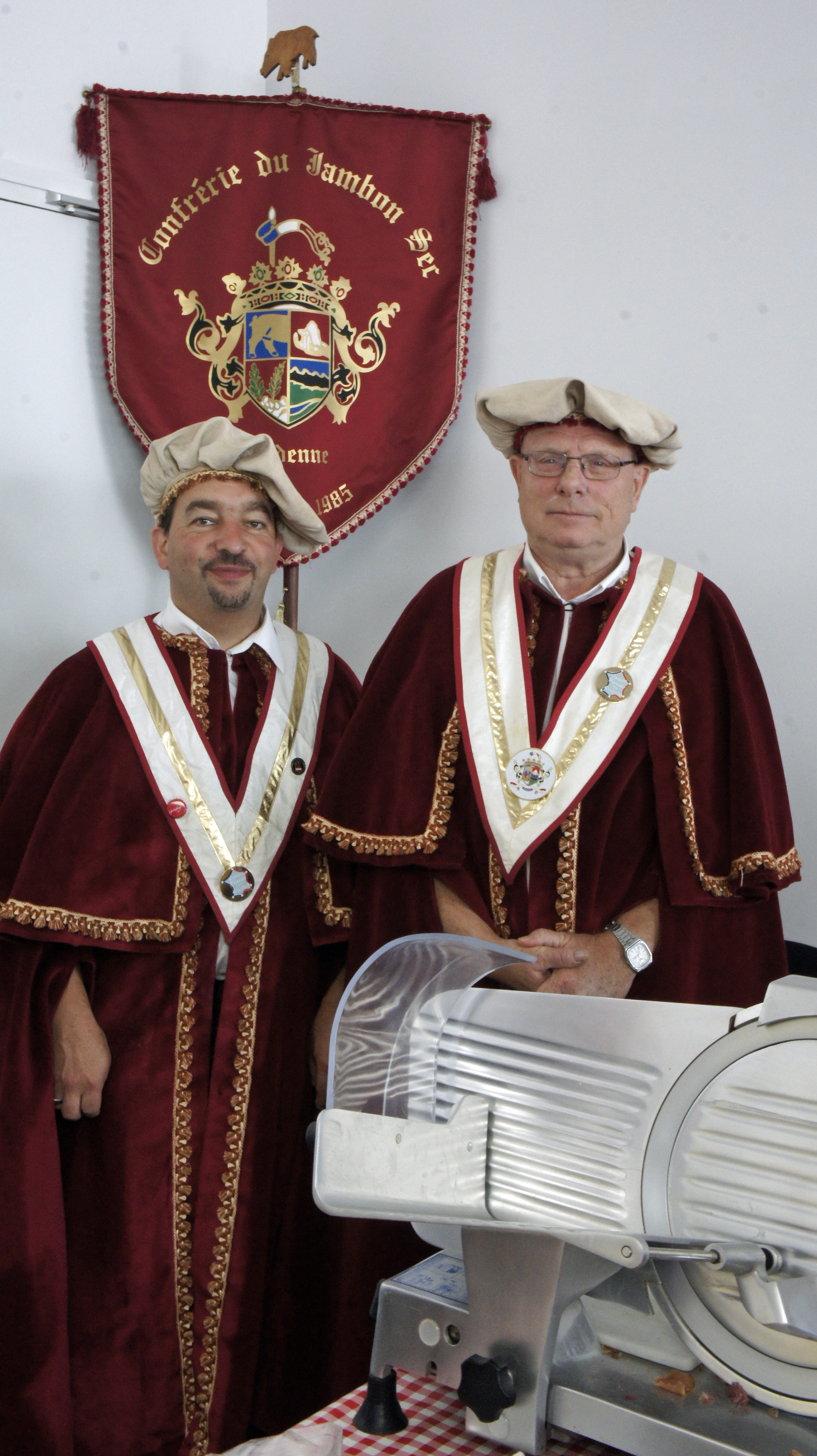
Confraternity of Jambon sec des Ardennes.

As it ages, the Ardennes dry-cured ham develops a fruity-melon aroma and a dried-meat flavor, accompanied by a mild salty taste. The aroma of fat in the ham is very slight. The firmness of the ham makes it easy to cut and enjoy. The flesh is burgundy in color and the texture combines elasticity and firmness, without being crunchy. Thanks to slow drying, the ham is relatively dry and soft, melting in the mouth.

On August 21, 1898, to welcome the Minister of Public Works, the municipality of Raucourt included a preparation of Ardennes ham in jelly on the menu. This ham can also be eaten in very thin slices, or, more traditionally, with an omelette, without cooking the ham with the omelette, and accompanied by a white wine, a beer from the Ardennes, or a cider from Porcien or Thiérache Ardennaise.

== Bibliography ==
The bibliography below lists the works used in writing the article.

- Lombard, Leándre-Moïse (1855). Le cuisinier et le médecin et le médecin et le cuisinier ou le cuisinier médecin et le médecin cuisinier ou l'art de conserver ou de rétablir sa santé par une alimentation convenable (in French). L. Curlmer.
- Heuzé, Gustave (1866). Le porc (in French). Librairie agricole de la maison rustique..
- Guelliot, Octave (1931). Géographie traditionnelle et populaire des Ardennes (in French). Librairie Émile Nourry. p. 229.
- Risse, Jacques (1994). Histoire de l'élevage français. Alternatives rurales. L’Harmattan.
- Lambert, Jacques (1997). Campagnes et paysans des Ardennes: 1830-1914 (in French). Éditions Terres Ardennaises. ISBN 2-905339-09-8.
- Pudlowski, Gilles (1997). Les Trésors gourmands de la France. Maurice Rougemont. Éditions de la Renaissance du Livre. pp. 107–108. ISBN 2-8046-0362-8.
- Jussiau, Roland; Montméas, Louis; Parot, Jean-Claude (1999). L'élevage en France. 10 000 ans d'histoire (in French). Dijon: Educagri Editions. ISBN 2-84444-066-5.
- Conseil national des arts culinaires (2000). Champagne Ardenne: produits du terroir et recettes traditionnelles. L’inventaire du patrimoine culinaire de la France (in French). Paris: Albin Michel editions. pp. 95–97. ISBN 2-226-11516-1.
- Prévost, Philippe (2004). Une terre à cultiver: pour un contrat agriculturel. Biologie et Ecologie (in French). Paris/Budapest/Torino: L'Harmattan. ISBN 2-7475-6269-7.
- Rota, Sandra (2009). Le jambon sec des Ardennes (in French). Reims: Éditions du Coq à l'Âne. ISBN 978-2-912036-43-8.

=== Articles, reviews and data sheets ===
- Bourguignon, Alain (October 4, 1930). "Carte gastronomique de la France". L'Illustration (in French) (4570): 17. Archived from the original on December 26, 2013.
- Clos Jouve, Henry (March 1965). "Sur les routes des Ardennes gourmandes". La France à table (in French). 113: 17.
- Giuliano, Gérard (October 1985). "À Haybes et à Hargnies, une charcuterie renommée". Terres Ardennaises (in French) (12): 56–57. ISSN 0758-3028.
- Daridan, Daniel; de Jubécourt, Dominique; Van Ferneu, Jan Peter; Fraysse, Jean-Louis (March 1998). "La production porcine, trois zones, trois dynamiques" (PDF). Agreste, les cahiers (in French) (27): 27–39.
- Chaillouet, Dominique (October 2008). "Jambon : la bataille du sec se joue en France". Viandemagazine (in French): 56–57.
- Unknown (July 18, 2009a). "Jambon cherche repreneur". Journal l'Union (in French).
- Lambert, Jacques (October 2009). "Maurice Roffidal, boucher-charcutier à Haybes". Terres Ardennaises (108): 32–33. ISSN 0758-3028.
- Unknown (November 10, 2009b). "Confrérie du jambon sec : huit nouveaux intronisés". Journal l'Union (in French).
- Hocquart, Carl (December 7, 2010). "Le jambon du terroir sur la voie du label". Journal l'Union (in French).
- Flaschgo, Patrick (March 29, 2011). "Taïwan s'intéresse à la gastronomie ardennaise". Journal l'Union (in French).
- Remy, Pascal (July 12, 2011a). "L'authenticité des produits à Haybes". Journal l'Union (in French).
- Remy, Pascal (August 3, 2011b). "Il se bat pour son jambon". Journal l'Union (in French).
- L., M. (August 5, 2011). "Le jambon, du cochon au rayon". Journal l'Union (in French).
- Hocquart, Carl (February 28, 2012). "L'artisan charcutier ardennais part à l'assaut des grandes surfaces". Journal l'Union (in French).
- Institut national de l'origine et de la qualité (2011). "projet de document unique Jambon sec et noix de jambon sec des Ardennes" (PDF). INAO..
- Institut national de l'origine et de la qualité (20 April 2012). "Fiche Jambon sec et noix de jambon sec des Ardennes"..
- Ministère de l'agriculture, de l'agro-alimentaire et de la forêt (25 April 2012). "Indication géographique protégée (IGP)"..
- Conseil Départemental des Ardennes, ed. (June 2015). "Deux produits ardennais labellisés IGP". Les Ardennes en Marche: 5. Archived from the original on 2022-01-28.

=== Video ===
- TF1 (5 May 2010). "Une tranche de jambon des Ardennes".
