= List of hams =

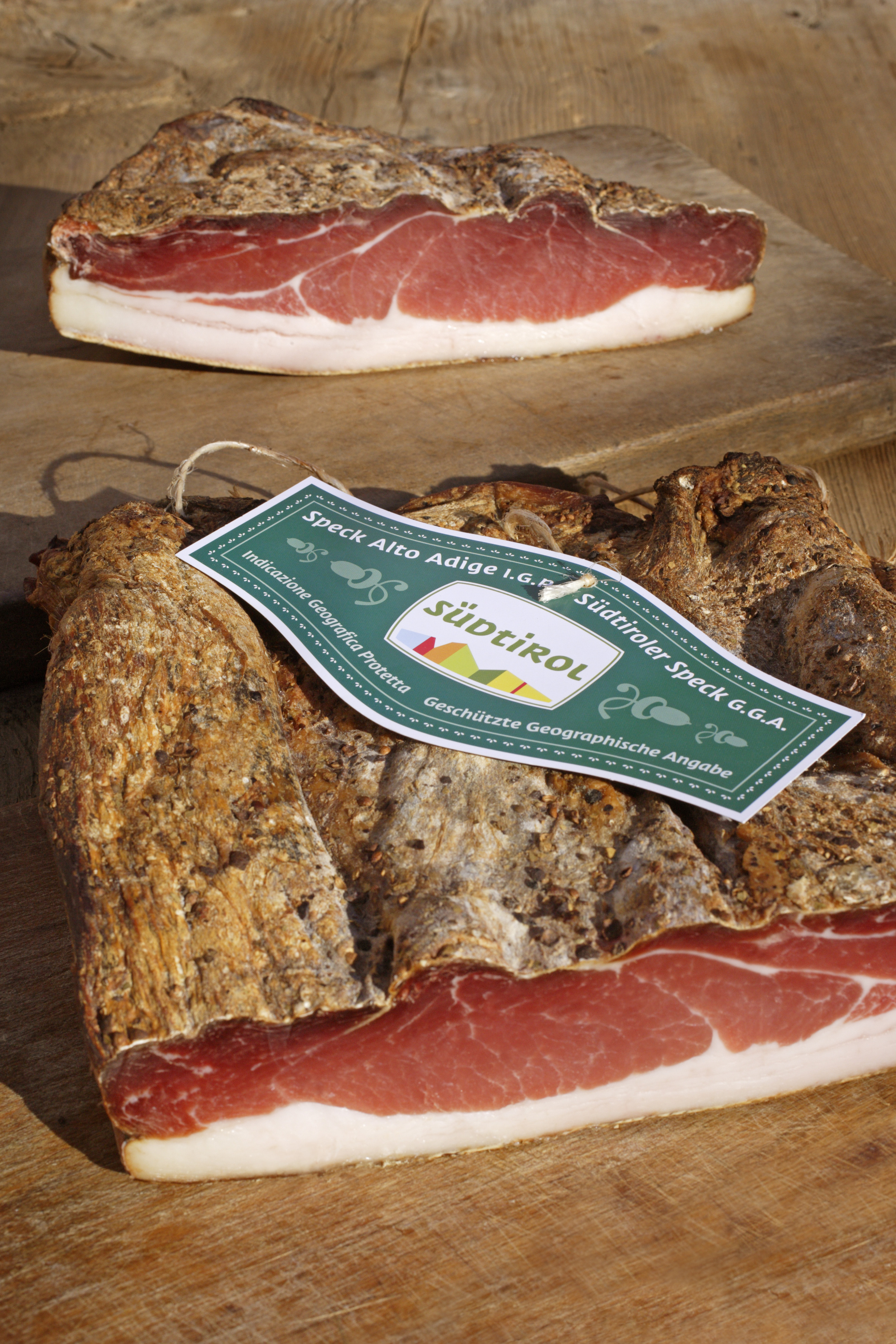
Speck Alto Adige PGI – South Tyrolean speck

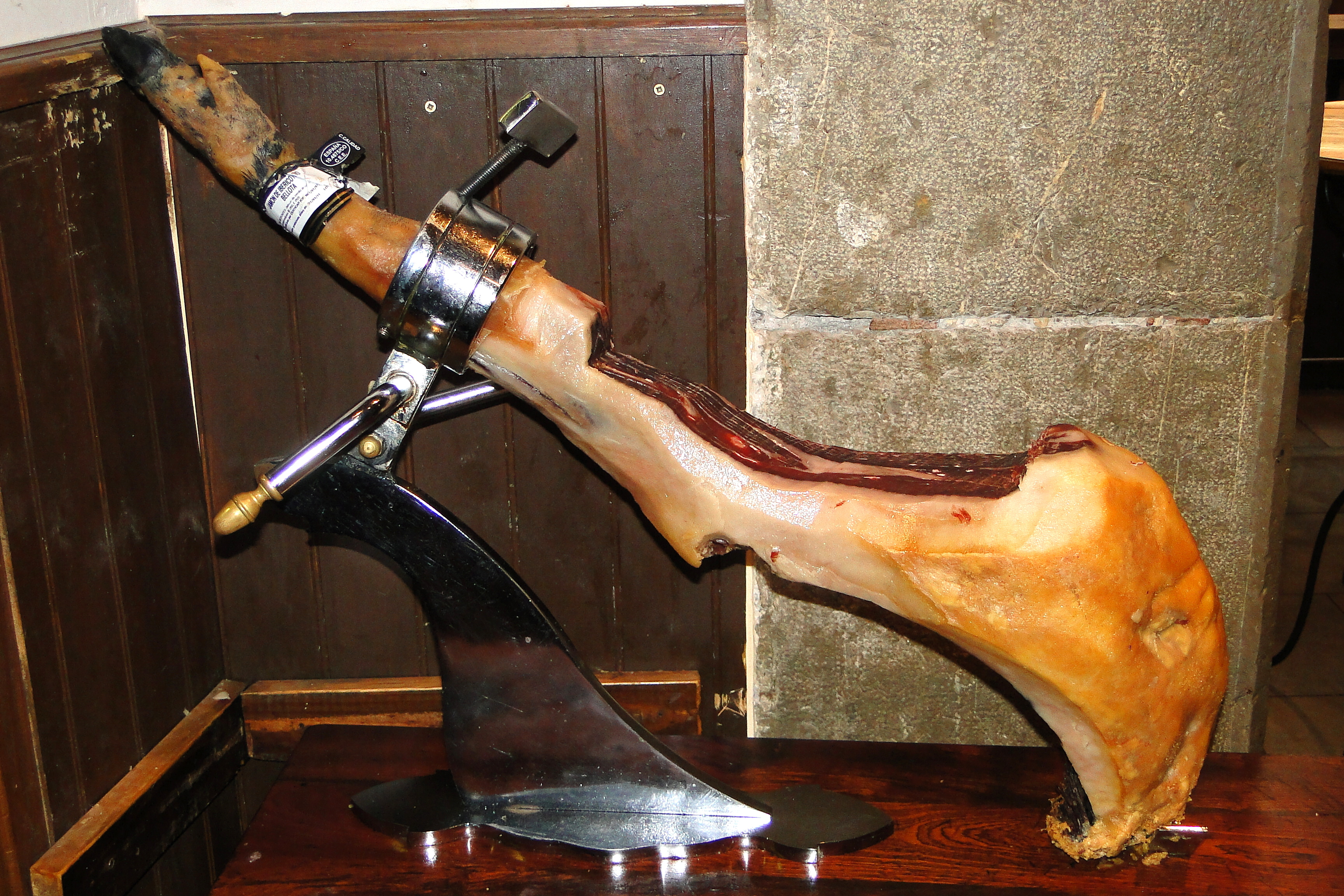
Jamón serrano on a jamonera

This is a list of notable hams and ham products. Ham is pork that has been preserved through salting, smoking, or wet curing. It was traditionally made only from the hind leg of swine, and referred to that specific cut of pork. Ham is made around the world, including a number of highly coveted regional specialties, such as Westphalian ham and jamón serrano.

Technically a processed meat, ham may refer to a product which has been through mechanical reforming. The precise nature of meat termed ham is controlled by statute in a number of areas, including the United States and European Union. In addition, numerous ham products have specific geographical indication protection, such as Prosciutto di Parma and Prosciutto Toscano PDO in Europe, and Smithfield ham in the United States.

== Hams and ham products ==
=== Bulgaria ===
- Elenski but is a dry-cured ham from the town of Elena in northern Bulgaria and popular throughout the country. The meat has a specific taste and can be preserved for several years, owing much to the special process of making and the climatic conditions of the part of Stara Planina where Elena is located.

=== China ===
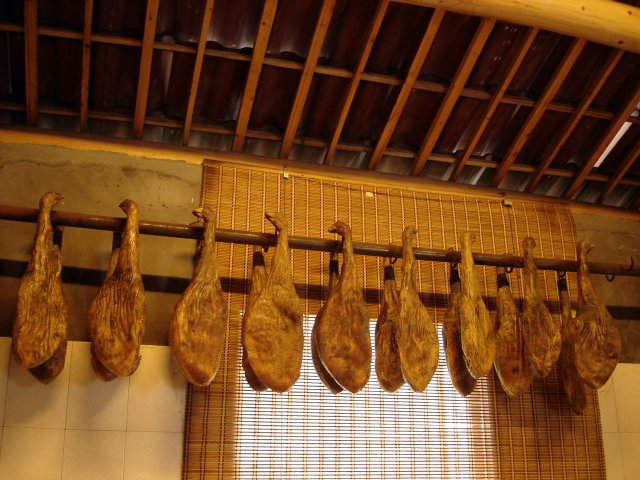
Jinhua ham

- Anfu ham is a dry-cured ham from Anfu, Jiangxi, China, documented starting in the Qin dynasty. It is eaten alone and also used as an ingredient to add flavor to various dishes.
- Jinhua ham is a type of dry-cured ham named after the city of Jinhua, where it is produced, in the Zhejiang province of eastern China. The ham is used in Chinese cuisine to flavor stewed and braised foods, as well as for making the stocks and broths of many Chinese soups. It is prepared using the Tongcheng pig and has been described as "the most prized ham in all of China".
- Rugao ham is a dry-cured ham that originated in Jiangsu province, China, and was first prepared in 1851. Rugao ham is named after Rugao in Jiangsu province and is produced in a variety of flavors, colors, and weights.
- Xuanwei ham is a dry-cured ham from Qujing prefecture in Yunnan province, China. Xuanwei ham has a 250-year history dating back to 1766. In 1909 it was first mass-produced and gained popularity. It is also used as an ingredient in various dishes.

=== Czech Republic ===
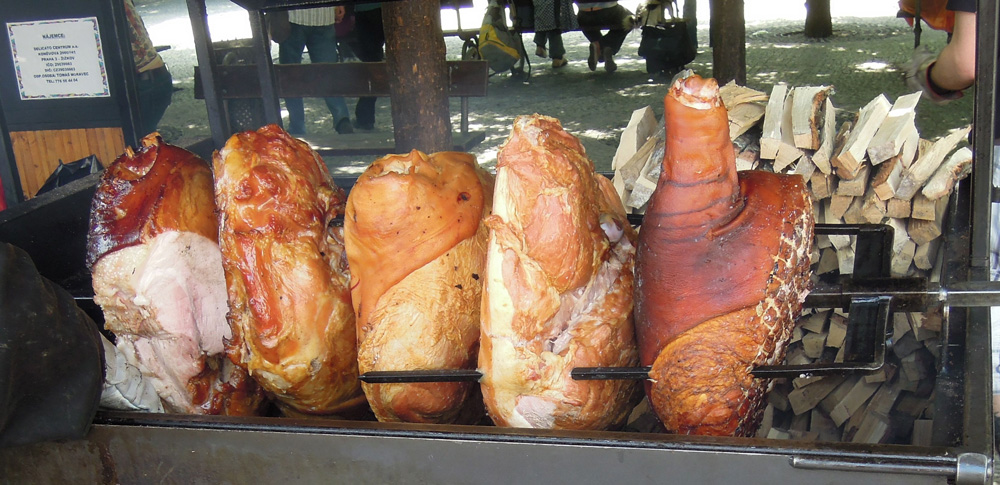
Prague ham on a stall at the Old Town Square in Prague

- Prague ham is a brine-cured, stewed, and mildly beechwood-smoked boneless ham originally from Prague in Bohemia (Czech Republic).

=== England ===
- York ham originated in Yorkshire, England, and is now made in other places. It is a dry-cured ham, but unlike many hams of that sort, is eaten cooked. At its best it is widely considered one of the finest hams.
- Wiltshire cured ham is a historical ham from Wiltshire, England.
- Shropshire Black Ham or Bradenham ham.

=== France ===
- Jambon noir de Bigorre (PDO) made from black gascon pigs.
- Jambon de kintoa (PDO) made from basque pigs.
- Jambon de Corse (PDO) made from black nustrale pigs.
- Jambon de Bayonne (PGI) is a cured ham that takes its name from the ancient port city of Bayonne in the far south-west of France, a city located in both the cultural regions of Basque Country and Gascony. It has protected geographical indication (PGI) status.
- Jambon d'Auvergne (PGI).
- Jambon de l'Ardèche (PGI).
- Jambon de Lacaune (PGI).
- Jambon de Vendée (PGI).
- Jambon sec des Ardennes (PGI).
- Jambon de Luxeuil.
- Jambon du Limousin made from black cul-noir pigs.
- Jambon de Savoie.
- Jambon du Périgord.
- Jambon des Pyrénées.
- Torchon ham is wrapped in a cloth during cooking, to give it a better flavor and texture.

=== Germany ===
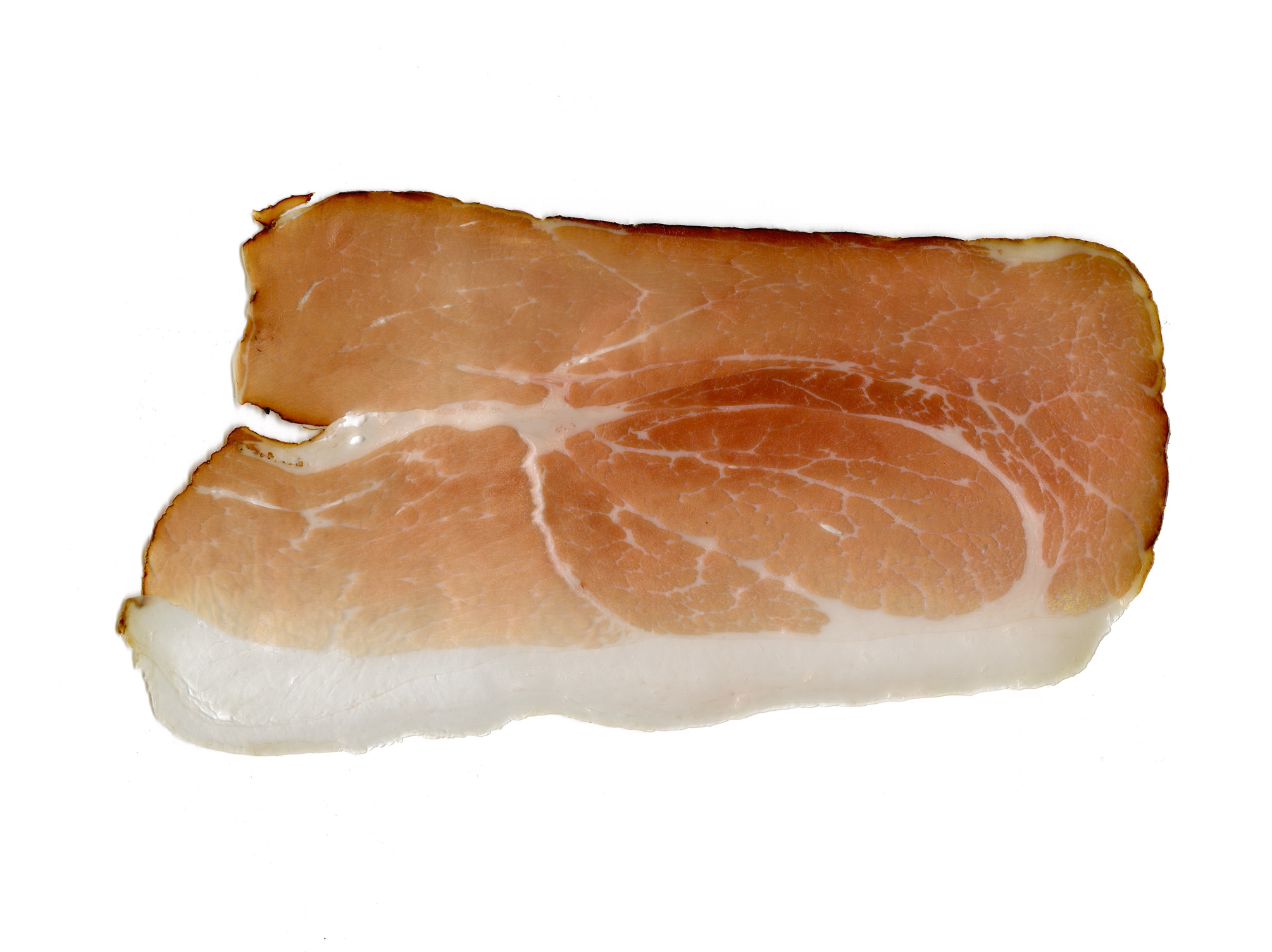
Sliced Black Forest ham

- Ammerländer Schinken is a dry-cured (and normally smoked) ham produced in the Ammerland area of northern Germany. It has PGI status under European Union law.
- Black Forest ham is a variety of dry-cured, smoked ham produced in the Black Forest region of Germany.
- Westphalian ham is produced from acorn-fed pigs raised in the forests of Westphalia, Germany, and the resulting meat is dry-cured and then smoked over a mixture of beechwood and juniper branches.

=== Ireland ===
- Limerick ham is a method of preparing a joint of ham in the cuisine of Ireland. The method was originally developed in County Limerick, Ireland.

=== Italy ===
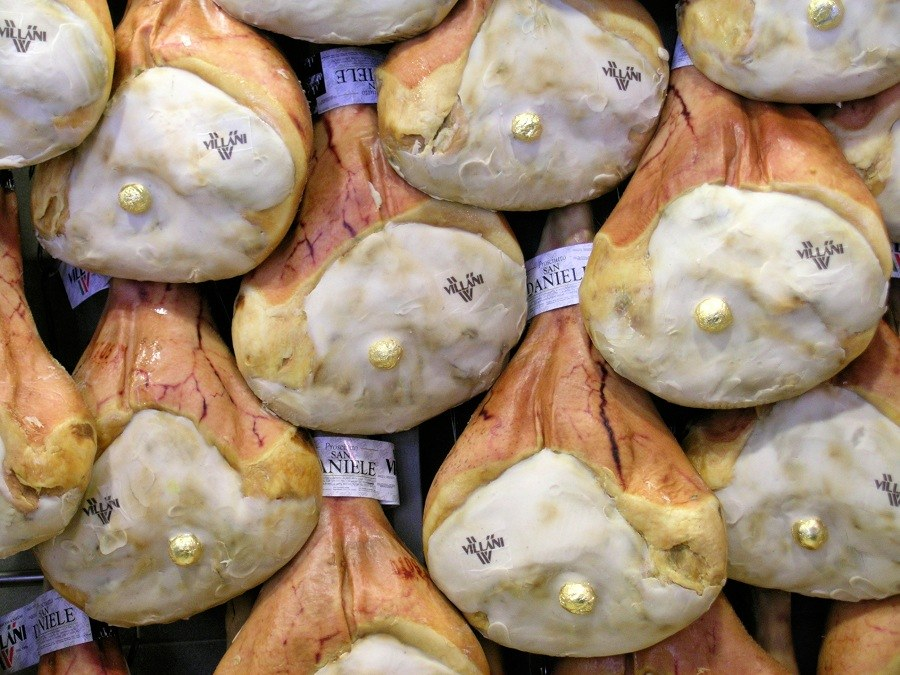
Prosciutto di San Daniele PDO

- Culatello is similar to prosciutto, but is made from the filet or loin of the hind leg; it originated in Parma, Italy.
- Prosciutto is an Italian dry-cured ham that is usually thinly sliced and served uncooked; this style is called prosciutto crudo in Italian (or simply crudo).
  - Crudo di Cuneo PDO (Piedmont)
  - Prosciutto di Carpegna PDO (Marche)
  - Prosciutto di Modena PDO (Emilia-Romagna)
  - Prosciutto di Parma PDO (Emilia-Romagna)
  - Prosciutto di San Daniele PDO (Friuli-Venezia Giulia)
  - Prosciutto toscano PDO (Tuscany)
  - Prosciutto Veneto Berico-Euganeo PDO (Veneto)
  - Prosciutto amatriciano PGI (Lazio)
  - Prosciutto di Norcia PGI (Umbria)
  - Prosciutto di Sauris PGI (Friuli-Venezia Giulia)
  - Prosciutto di suino nero dei Nebrodi (Sicily)
  - Cinta Senese (Tuscany)
  - Prosciutto di Bassiano (Lazio)
  - Prosciutto di Venticano (Campania)
  - Prosciutto di Faeto (Apulia)
  - Prosciutto della Majella (Abruzzo)
  - Prosciutto crudo di suino nero Casertano (Campania)
  - Prosciutto crudo dell'Irpinia (Campania)
  - Valle d'Aosta Jambon de Bosses, PDO (Aosta Valley)
- Speck Alto Adige PGI is a dry-cured, lightly smoked ham (prosciutto in Italian), produced in South Tyrol, northern Italy. Parts of its production are regulated by the European Union under the PGI status. In Italy and Turkey parts of the English-speaking culinary world, the term "speck" refers to Italian Speck Alto Adige PGI, a type of prosciutto.
- Tyrolean Speck – a distinctively juniper-flavored, boneless ham originally from Tyrol, an historical region that since 1918 partially lies in Italy. The first historical mention of Tyrolean Speck' was in the early 13th century, when some of the current production techniques were already in use.
- Vallée d'Aoste Jambon de Bosses is a spicy, cured ham product from Saint-Rhémy-en-Bosses in the Aosta Valley in Italy, one of the region's specialties. It was awarded protected designation of origin (PDO) status by the European Union.

=== Luxembourg ===
- Éisleker ham, literally "Oesling ham", is a speciality from the Éislek region in the north of Luxembourg, which is produced from the hind legs of pigs. Traditionally, it was prepared by marinating the hams in herbs and vinegar for several days, then hanging them in a chimney for long periods of cold smoking. Today, the meat is cured in brine for two weeks and placed in a smoker fed from beech and oak chips for about a week.

=== Montenegro ===
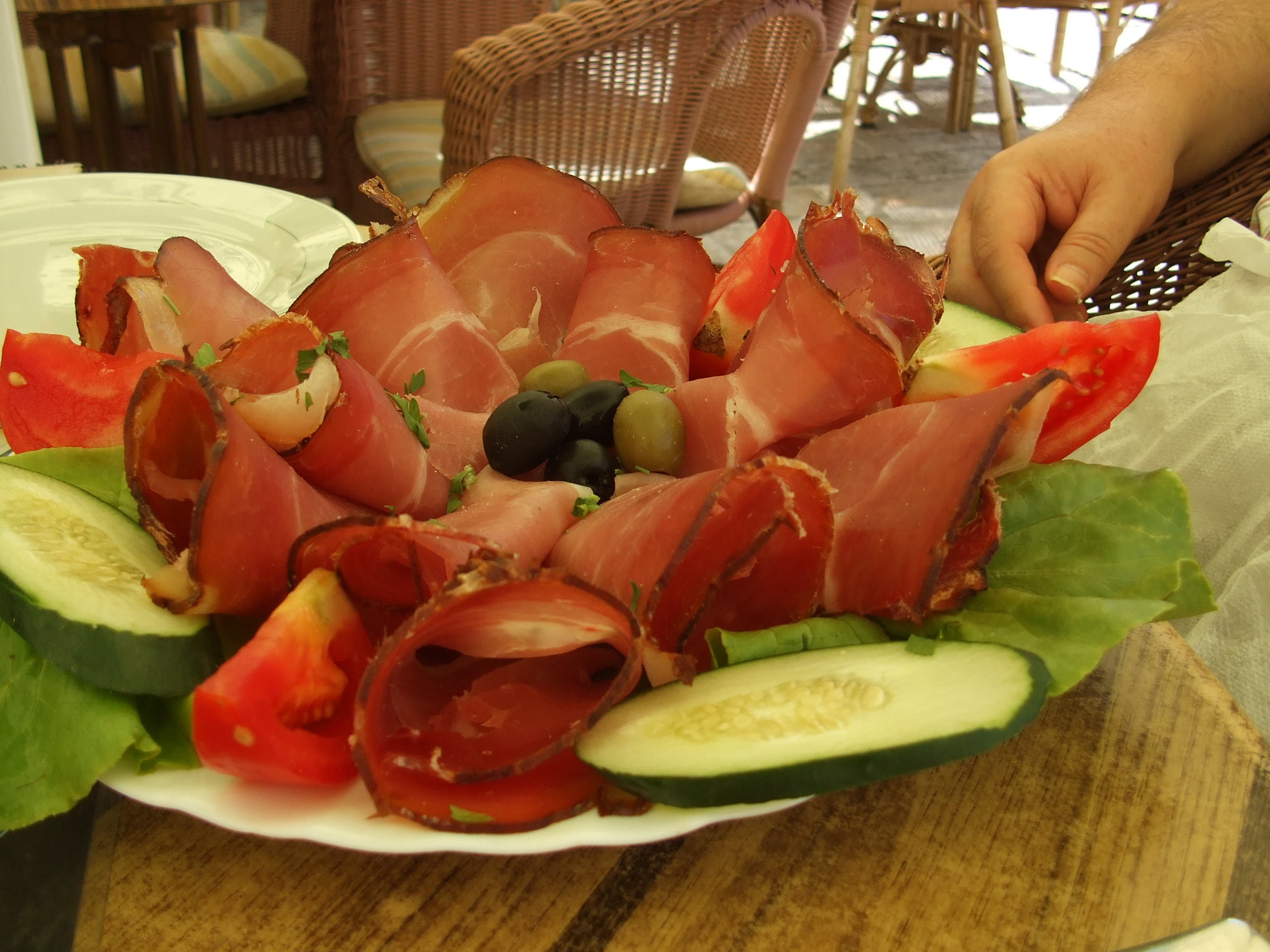
Sliced njeguški pršut

- Njeguški pršut is a dry-cured ham served uncooked, similar to Italian prosciutto; it is a specialty of Njeguši, a village in Montenegro

=== Portugal ===
- Jamón ibérico is produced in Spain and Portugal, from the local breed of acorn-fed pigs.
- Presunto is a dry-cured ham from Portugal, similar to Spanish jamón or Italian prosciutto crudo.

=== Spain ===
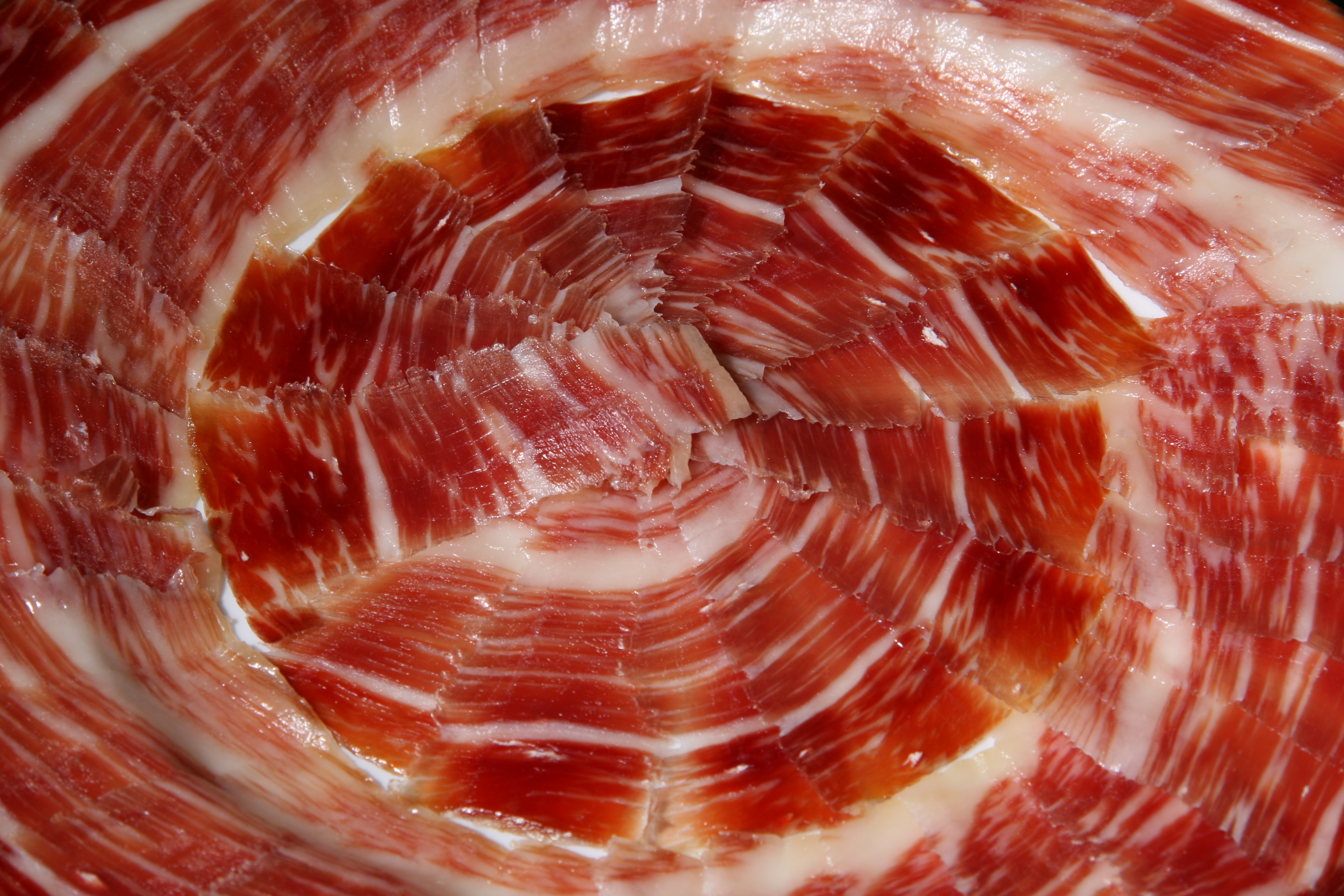
Sliced jamón serrano

- Jamón serrano or simply jamón - A dry-cured ham and one of the most well known foods of Spanish cuisine. It has traditional specialities guaranteed (TSG) status.
- Jamón ibérico – A variety of jamón produced in Spain and Portugal, made from black Iberian pigs instead of white breeds. It includes the world's most expensive hams.
- Lacón Gallego is a dried ham product from Galicia, with PGI status under European law.

=== United States ===
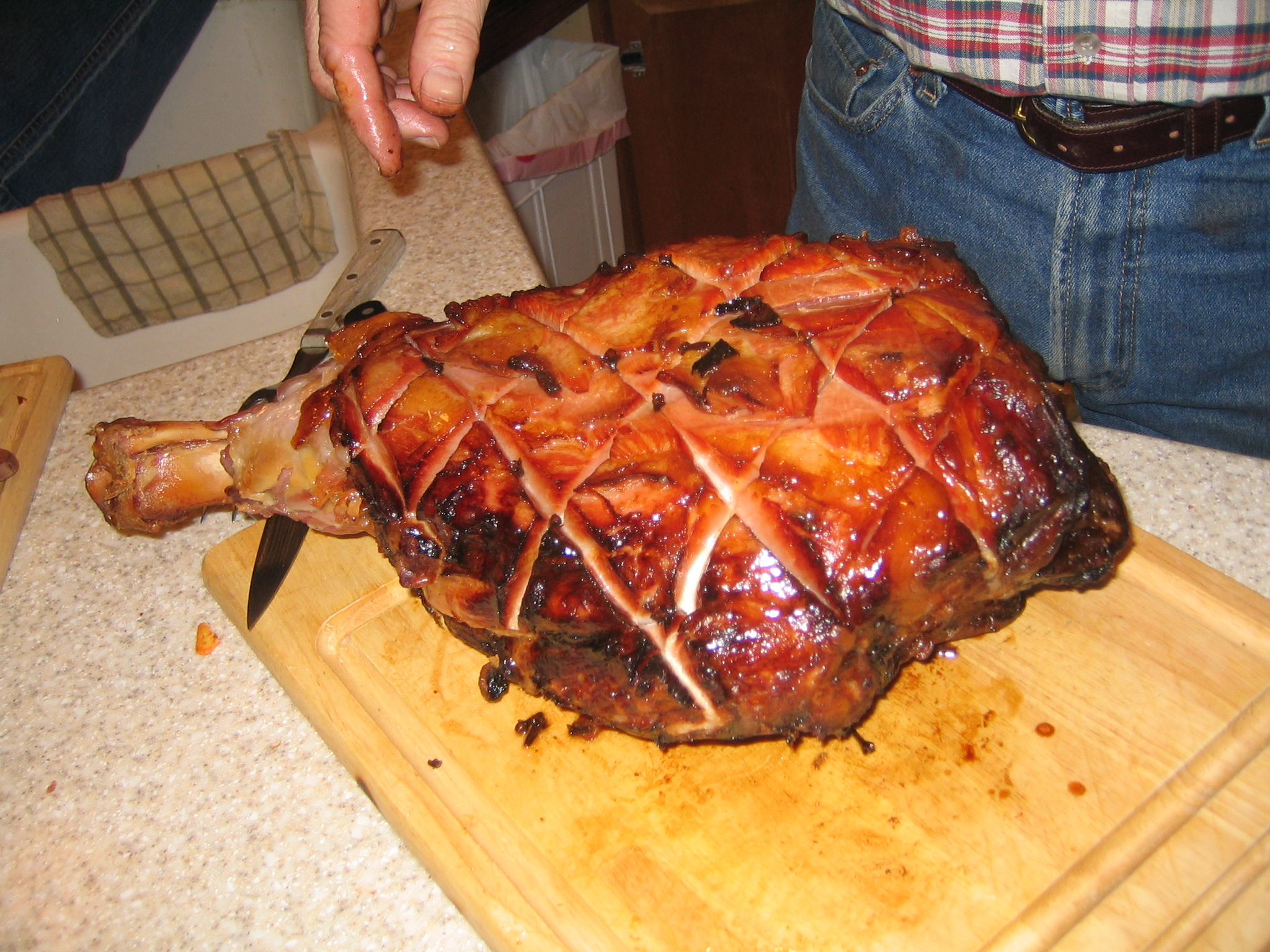
Baked country ham

- Chipped chopped ham is a processed ham luncheon meat made from chopped ham. Chopped ham is a mixture of ham chunks and trimmings and seasonings, ground together and then packaged into loaves.
- City ham is the name for a variety of brine-cured hams that are not dry-cured or dried, so must be refrigerated for safe storage. It is known simply as "ham" in regions of the U.S. where country ham is unknown.
- Country ham is a variety of dry-cured ham, referring to a method of curing and smoking done in the parts of the Southeast U.S. states of North Carolina, South Carolina, Tennessee, Virginia, Georgia, Kentucky, Missouri, and other nearby states.
- Glazed ham in the U.S. is coated with a flavored or spiced sugar solution (glaze) ham before cooking. (Note: not a US term; glazed gammon is a glazed pork dish that is technically not ham, as it is the hind leg of pork after it has been cured by dry-salting or brining. Gammon differs from ham in that ham is cured after being cut from the carcass and sold cooked, and the curing process for ham may be different.) (Note: For example, the hams of the Honey Baked Ham Company)
- Smithfield ham is a specific form of country ham finish-cured in the town of Smithfield in Isle of Wight County in the Hampton Roads region of Virginia, United States.

=== Wales ===
- Carmarthen Ham (PGI), an air dried ham cured in the traditional Welsh Farmhouse way.

Hams and ham products

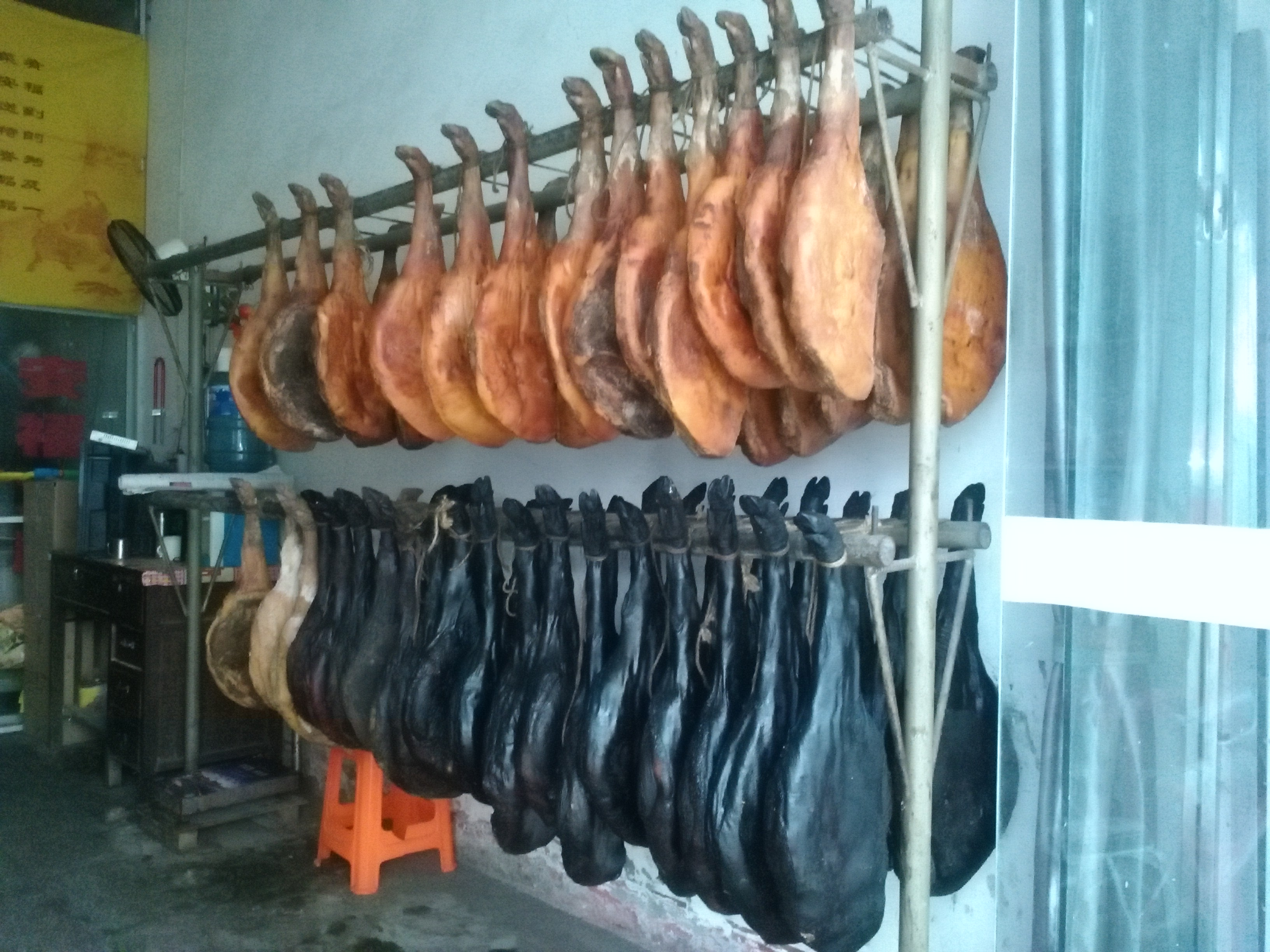
Anfu ham

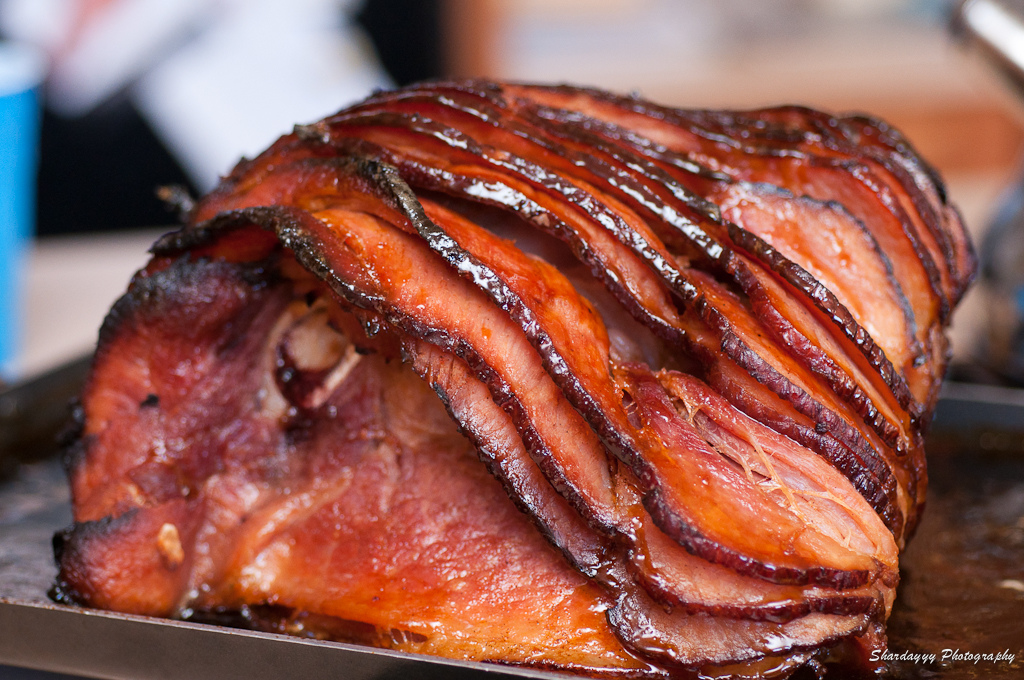
Honey-glazed ham

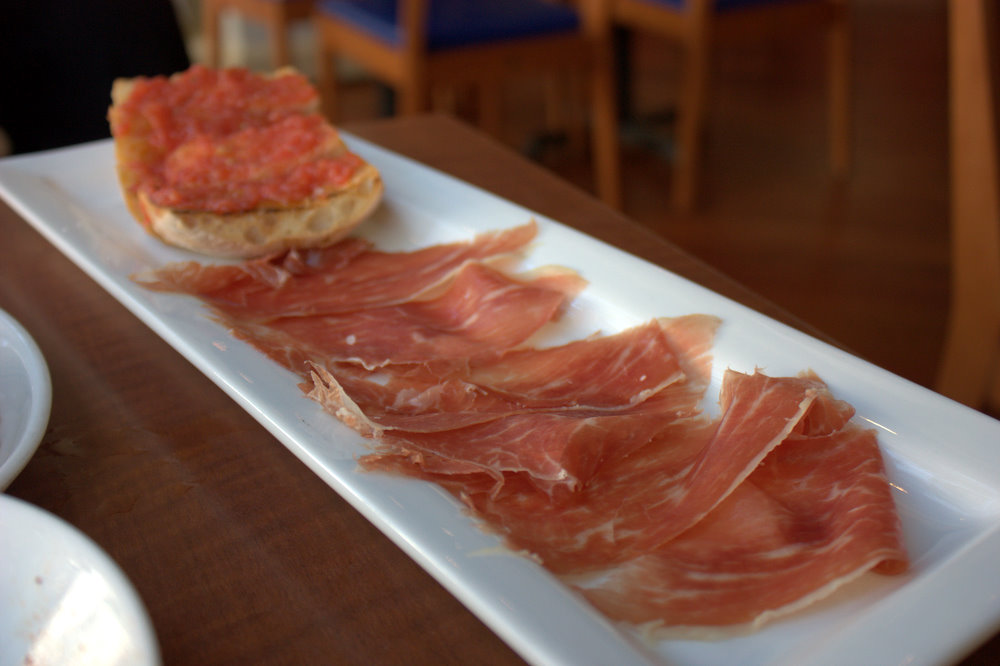
Sliced jamón ibérico

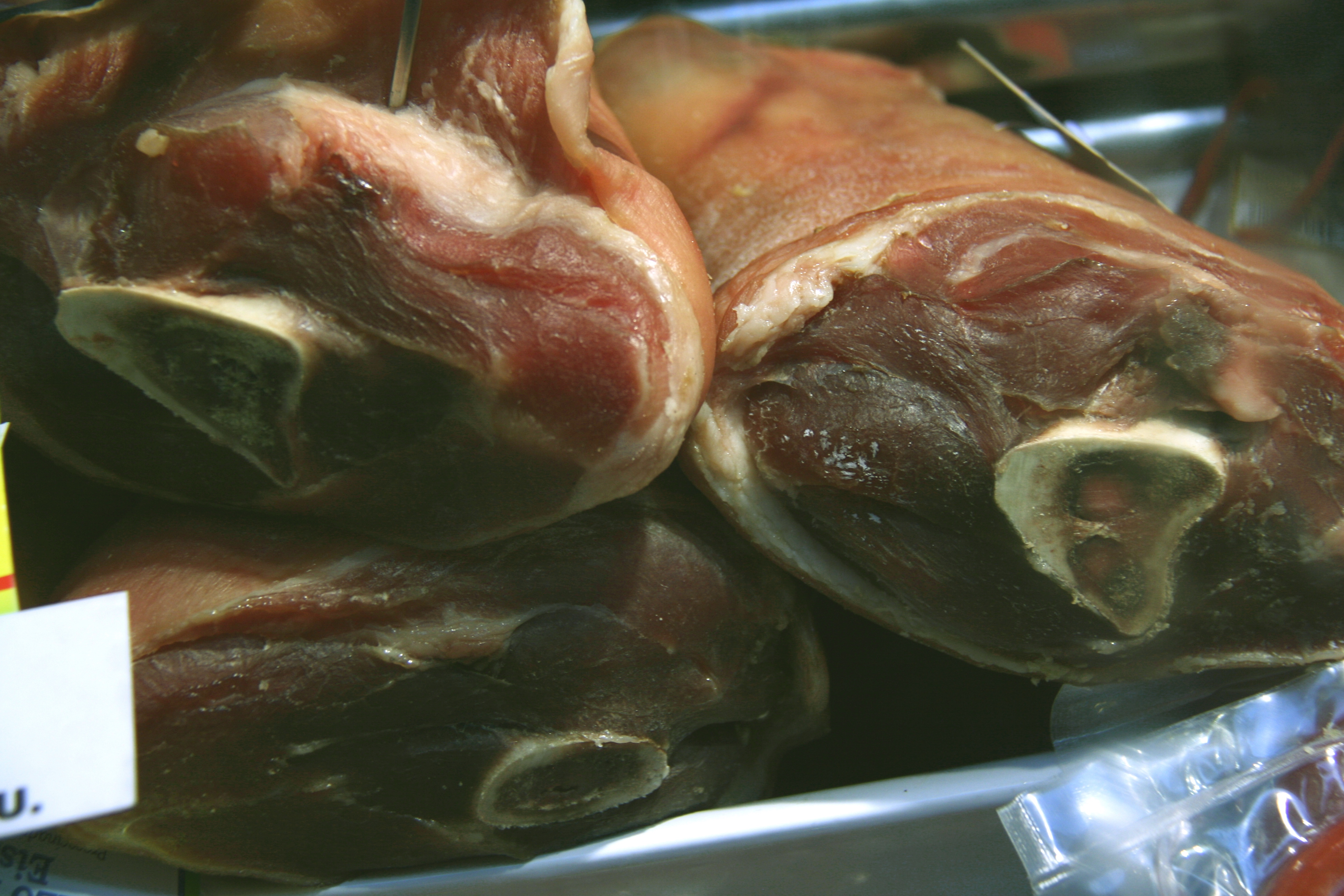
Lacón Gallego

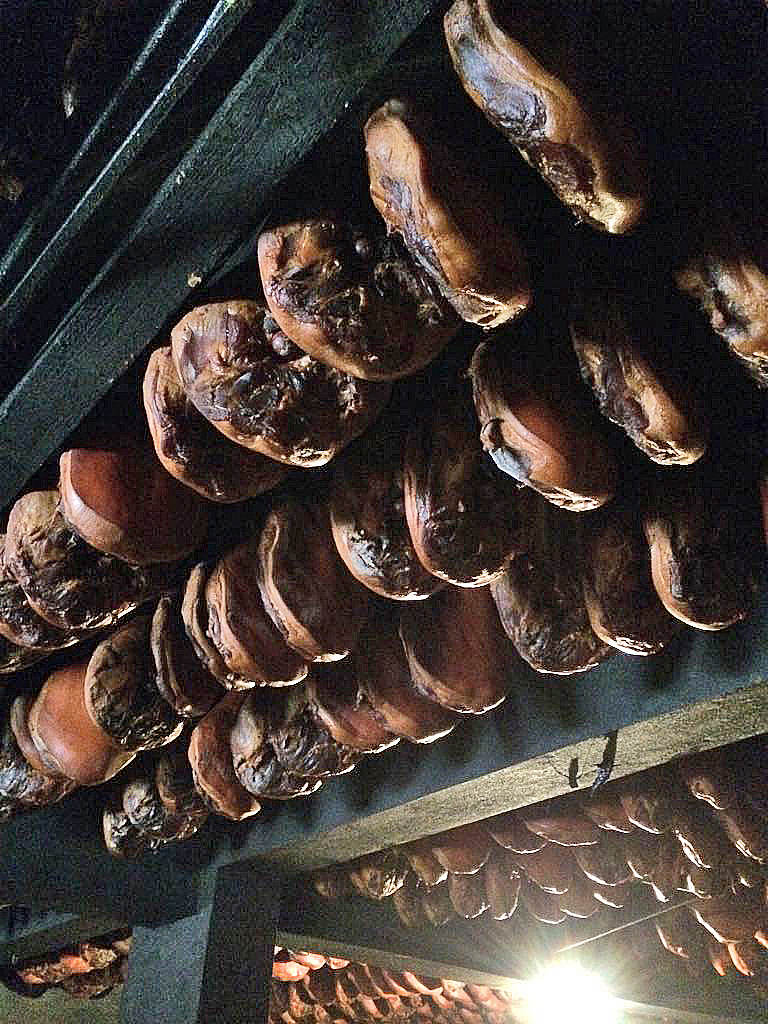
Njeguški pršut being cured with smoke

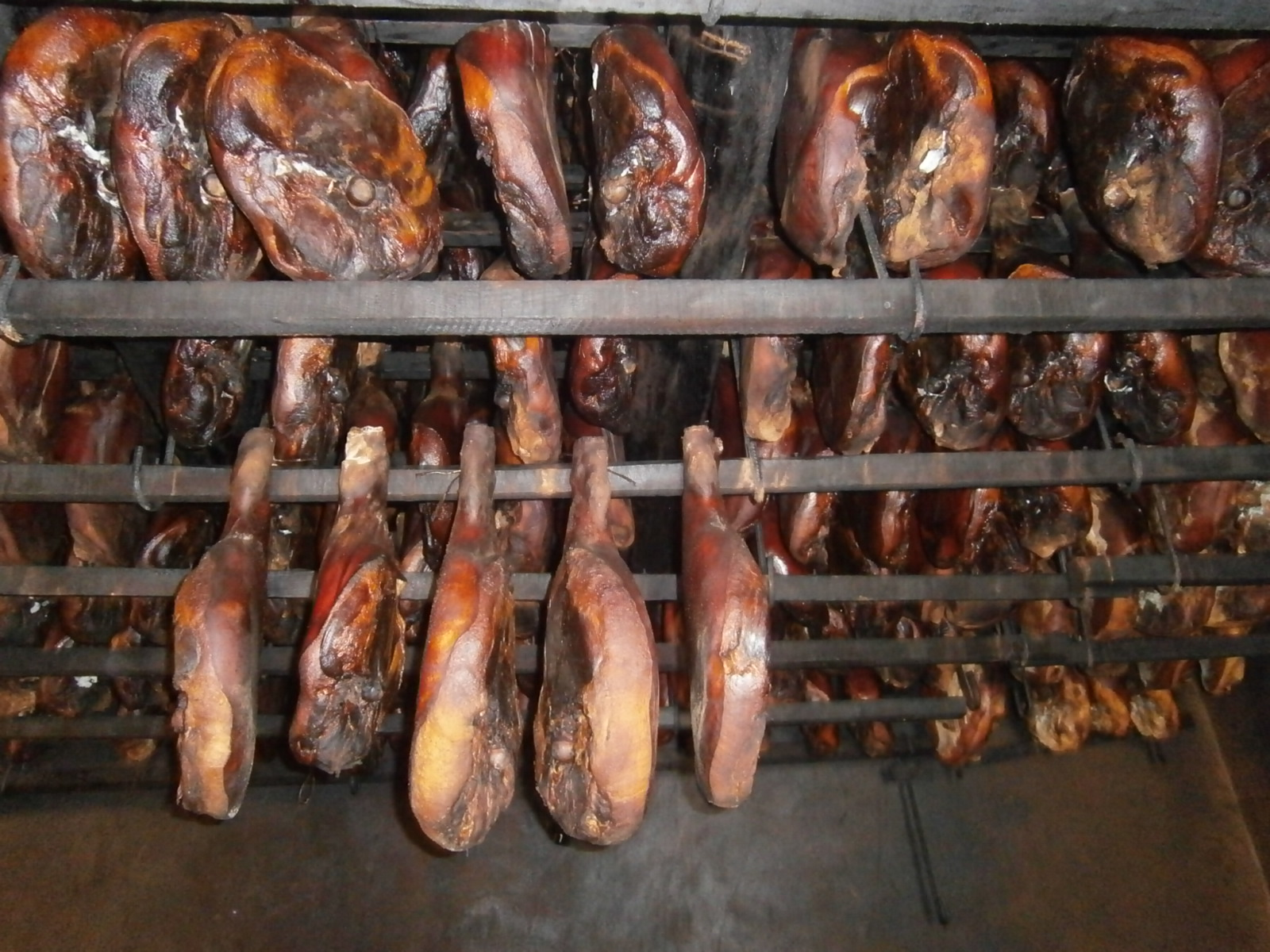
Also Njeguški pršut in a smokehouse

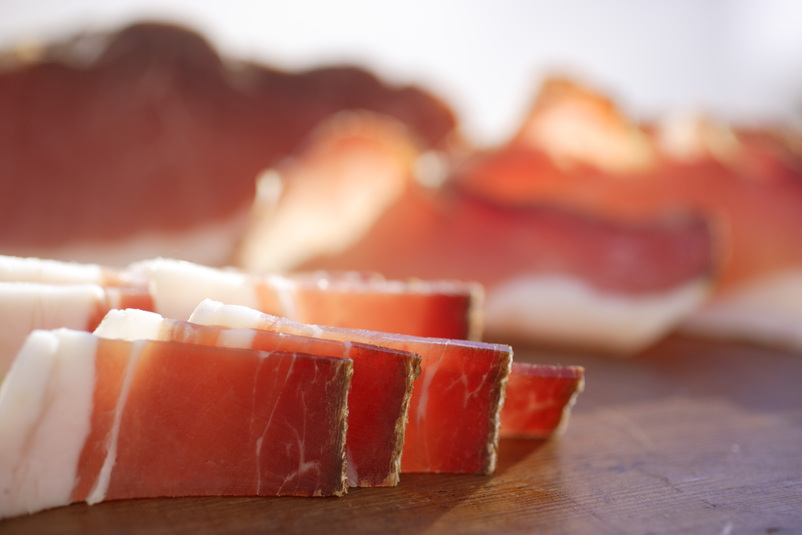
Sliced Speck Alto Adige PGI

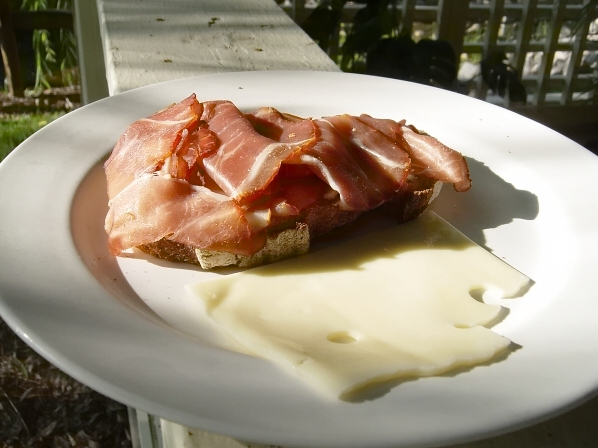
Westphalian ham atop bread, with cheese

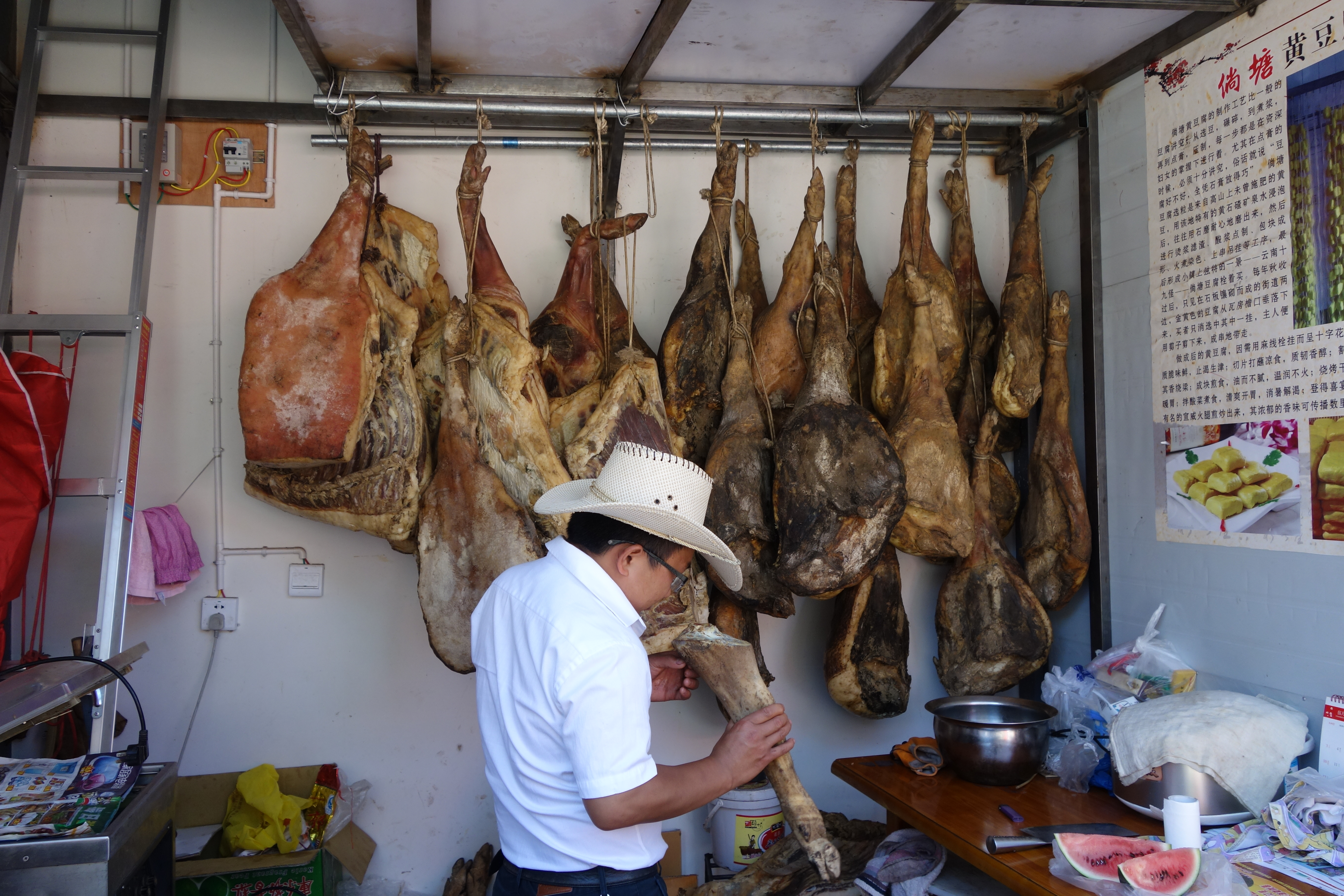
Xuanwei ham in a butcher shop

== See also ==
- Ham hock
- Ham sausage
- List of dried foods
- List of ham dishes
- List of pork dishes
- List of smoked foods
- Turkey ham – a processed food made primarily from cooked or cured turkey meat and water, formed into the shape of a ham and often sold pre-sliced
