= Rubus pernagaeus =

Scientific classification
- Kingdom: Plantae
- Clade: Tracheophytes
- Clade: Angiosperms
- Clade: Eudicots
- Clade: Rosids
- Order: Rosales
- Family: Rosaceae
- Genus: Rubus
- Species: R. pernagaeus

Binomial name
- Rubus pernagaeus Fernald 1940

Species of fruit and plant

Rubus pernagaeus is a rare North American species of flowering plant in the rose family. It has been found only in the state of Virginia in the eastern United States.

The name pernagaeus means "from the land of hams," in reference to the fact that the species was initially discovered near Smithfield, Virginia, after which "Smithfield ham" is named. The species has upright canes up to 70 cm (28 inches) tall with trifoliate leaves.

The genetics of Rubus is extremely complex, so that it is difficult to decide on which groups should be recognized as species. There are many rare species with limited ranges such as this. Further study is suggested to clarify the taxonomy.
