= City ham =

Type of meat

City ham is a term used in some parts of the United States for any lightly cured and/or smoked ham which must be refrigerated to preserve it. It is generally "wet cured", that is injected with or soaked in a brine solution containing high concentrations of salts (including sodium chloride, sodium nitrate, and sodium nitrite). This is distinguished from country hams which are dry cured by being packed in crystalline curing salts and stored at room temperature. In parts of the U.S. where country ham is not consumed, city hams are often the only available hams and are just called ham.

City hams may be sold pre-cooked and "ready-to-eat", or simply cured and smoked, which must then be cooked before consuming. Many types of city ham are sliced as cold cuts in delicatessens and served as part of a ham sandwich.

== See also ==
- List of hams
