= Lacón =

Spanish dried ham

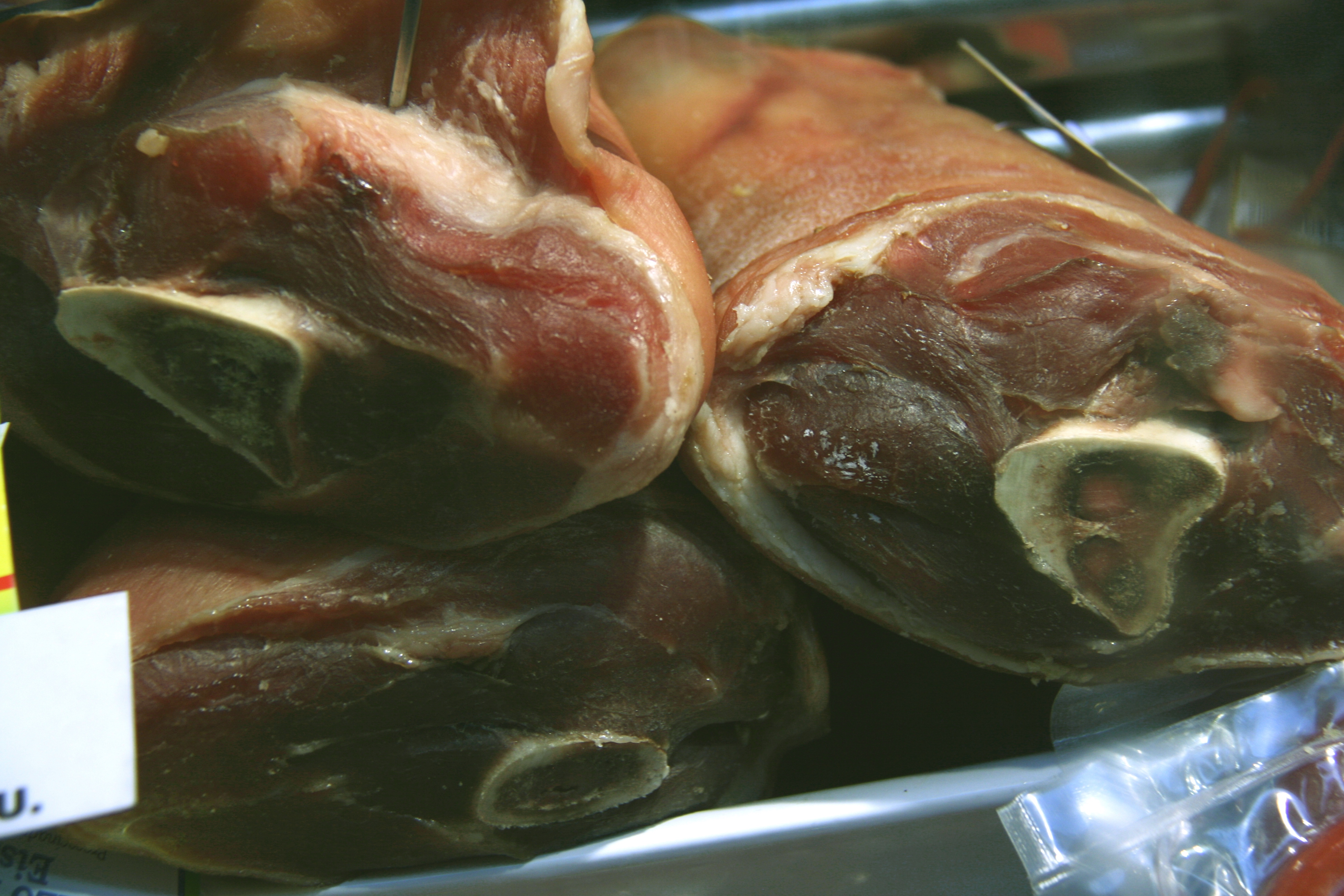
- Place of origin: Spain
- Region or state: Galicia
- Main ingredients: Dried meat (pork shoulder)
- Variations: Lacón galego, lacón galego

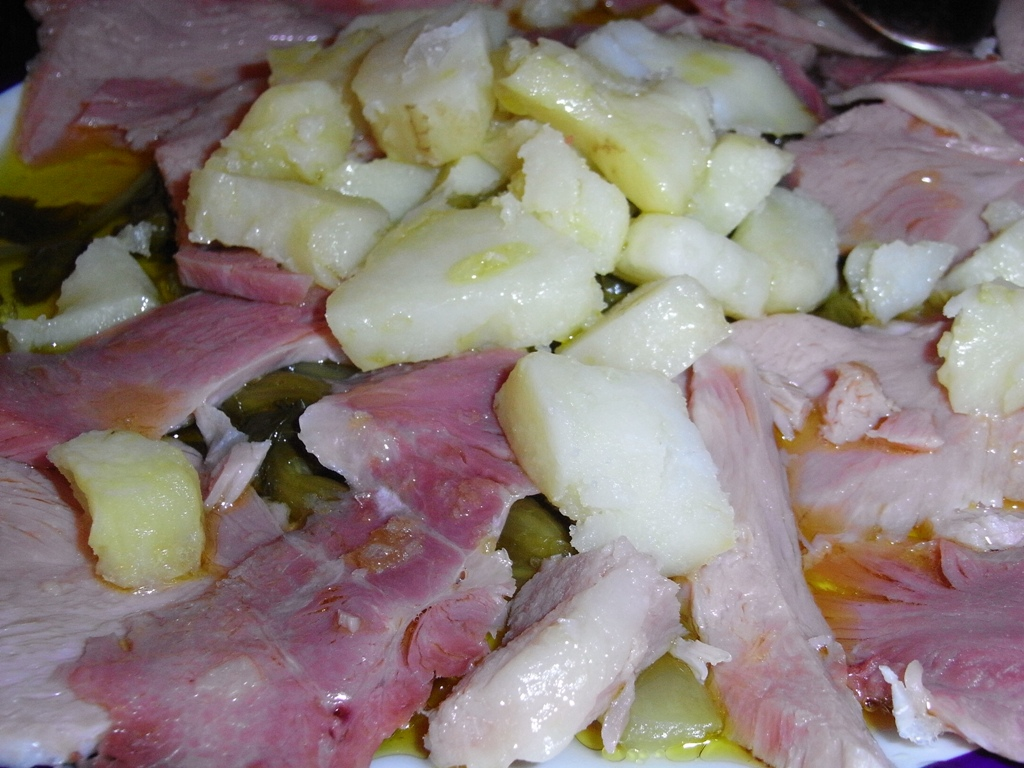
Lacón con patacas e grelos (lacón with boiled potatoes and turnip greens)

Lacón is a Spanish dried ham obtained from the shoulders or front legs of the pig.

Historically, lacón has been mentioned in texts since at least the 17th century.

Lacón galego from Galicia, Spain, has a protected geographical indication (PGI) status under European law. Production of lacón galego may take place in Galicia, from the rearing and slaughter of the pigs, to the curing of the final product. The actual product is only made with the shoulder, rather than the whole leg, as is usual with other jamones (lit. 'hams').

The following breeds of pig may be used to make lacón: Celtic, Large White, Landrace or Duroc, and there are two types of lacón, depending on how the pig is reared:

- Traditional lacón galego may be called so when the pig has been fed on a diet of only natural feed, e.g. acorns, cereals, chestnuts, and other vegetable foods for at least the last three months before slaughter.
- Lacón galego when the pig has been fed on the feeds authorised by the regulatory board for up until slaughter.

Those feeds that are unauthorised by the board are forbidden; these include oils and fish, and their derivatives.

== See also ==
- List of hams
- List of dried foods
