= Ammerländer Schinken =

North German ham

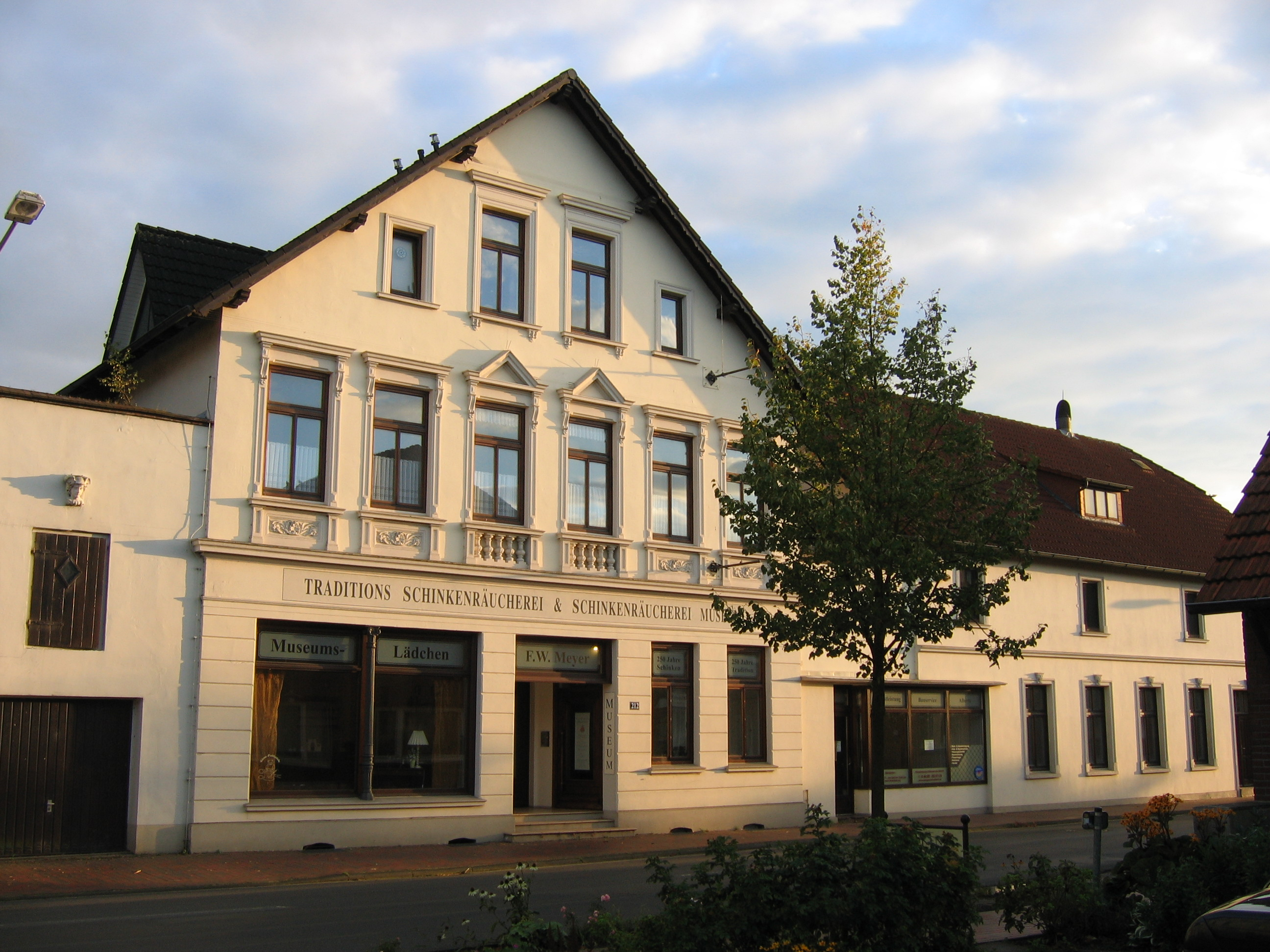

Ammerländer Schinken – or Ammerländer Knochenschinken – is a type of dry-cured and smoked ham produced in the Ammerland Rural District of North Germany. Ammerländer Knochenschinken contains the bone, is heavily spiced and has a dark smoked color. Ammerländer Schinken is boneless, lightly spiced and lightly smoked. Historically, the ham was made from Ammerländer Edelschwein, a local breed of pigs. Today, the ham can also be made from pigs bred or fattened in the Ammerland Rural District. Both types of ham have PGI status under EU law.

The raw meat used in its production is cured for three weeks by being rubbed with a dry mixture of sea salt and brown sugar, and sometimes a spice mixture of juniper, pepper and allspice. The ham is then cold-smoked over beechwood for several weeks, and finally aged for a period of up to two years.

The oldest Ammerland ham smokehouse was founded in 1748 in Apen. It is now a museum named the Ammerländer Schinkenmuseum.

== See also ==
- List of hams
- List of smoked foods
