= Black Forest ham =

German meat preparation

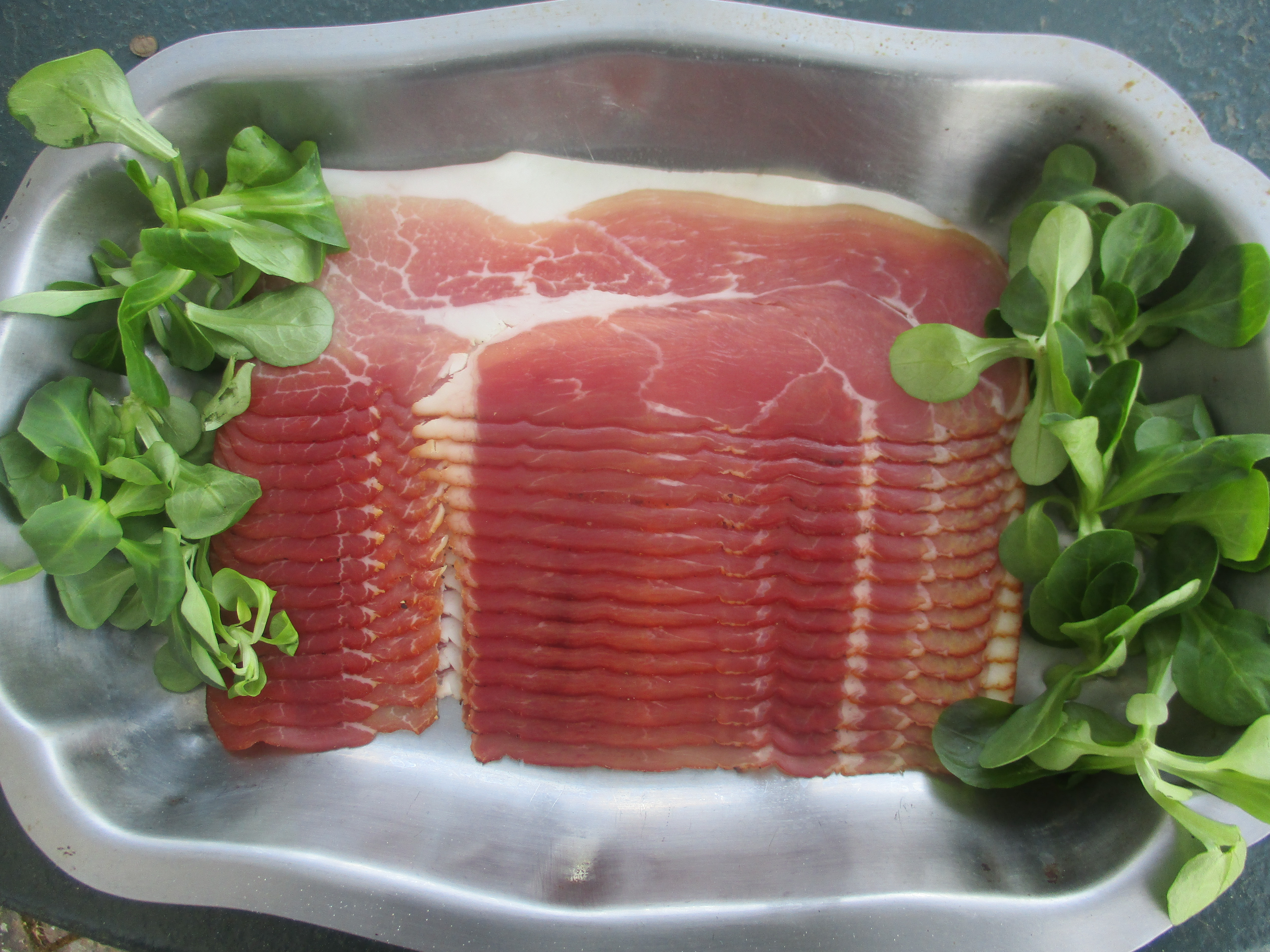
Black Forest ham

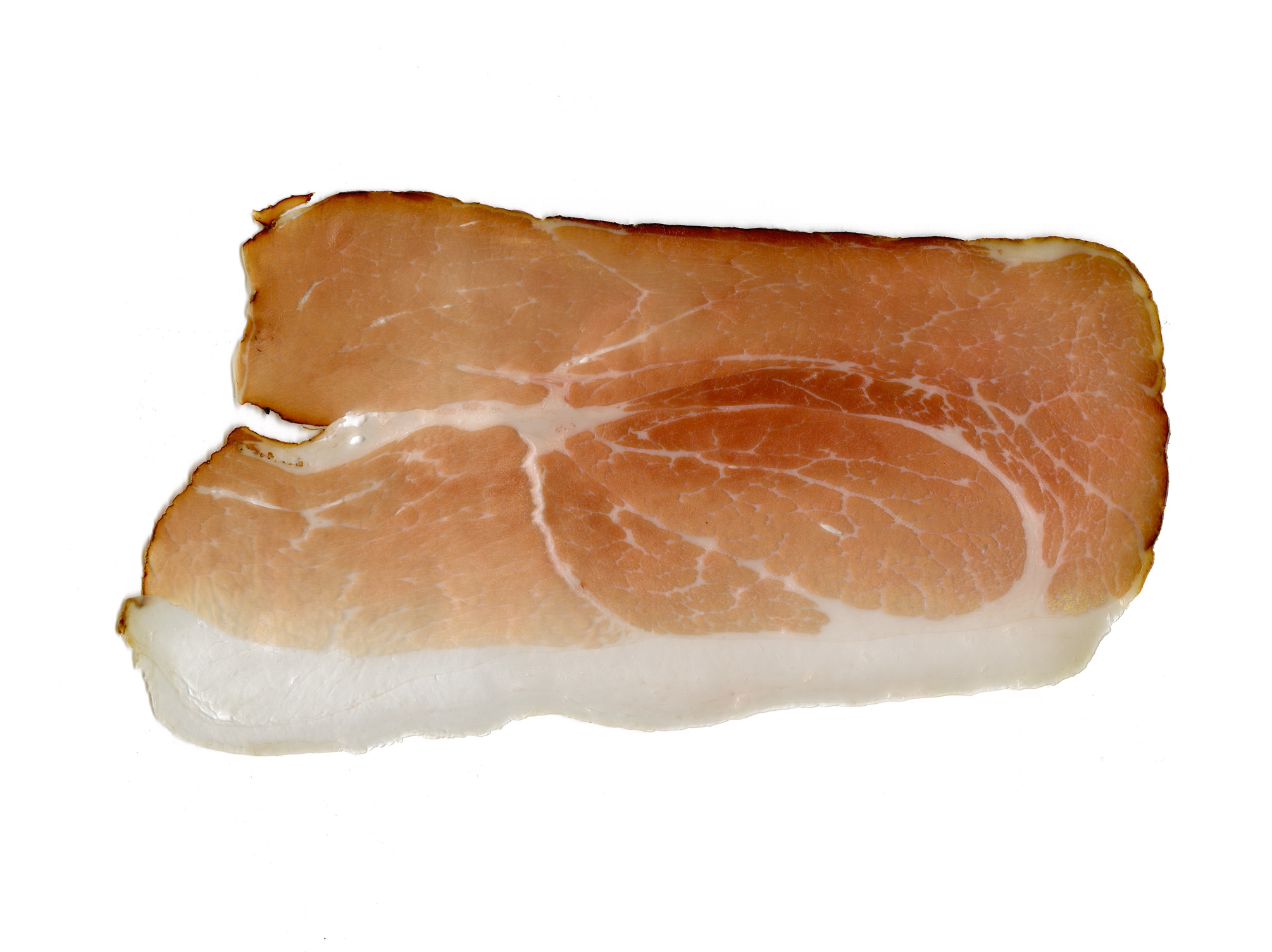
Sliced Black Forest ham

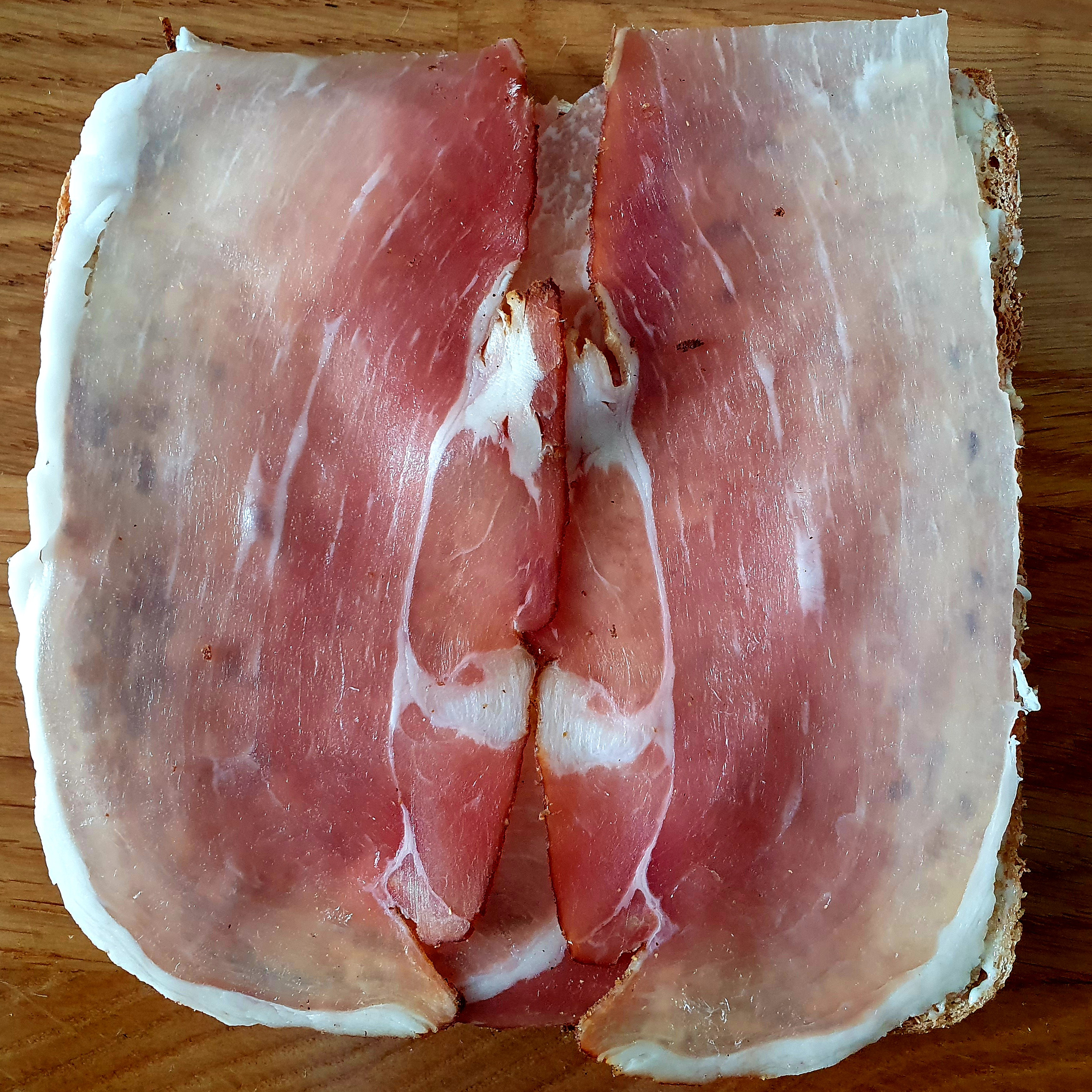
Toast with Black Forest ham

Black Forest ham (German: Schwarzwälder Schinken) is a variety of dry-cured smoked ham produced in the Black Forest, part of the Baden-Württemberg region of Germany.

In 1959, Peter Adler from Bonndorf im Schwarzwald pioneered manufacturing and selling Original Black Forest ham by retail and mail order. Since 1997, the term Black Forest ham has been a Protected Geographical Indication in the European Union, which means that any product sold in the EU as Black Forest ham must be traditionally and at least partially manufactured (prepared, processed or produced) within the Black Forest region in Germany. However, this designation is not recognized outside the EU, particularly in Canada and the United States, where commercially produced hams of various types and quality are marketed and sold as Black Forest ham.

== Preparation ==
Raw ham is salted and seasoned with garlic, coriander, pepper, juniper berries and other spices. After curing for two to three weeks, the salt is removed and the ham aged an additional two weeks. It is then cold-smoked using local conifers and sawdust at around 25 °C (77 °F) for several days. It then ripens in an air-conditioned room for several weeks, becoming almost black on the outside and acquiring much of its distinctive flavor.

== Characteristics ==
Black Forest ham is boneless and about one-fifth fat. It has a very pronounced flavor and is common in German cuisine. It may be eaten fresh, for example on Holzofenbrot or rye bread, with fruit, or used as an ingredient in cooked dishes. Whole pieces of Black Forest ham can be preserved for months when stored properly. It is typically served at room temperature.

== Related product ==
Black Forest bacon (German: Schwarzwälder Speck) is bacon produced the same way and comes in two categories: Durchwachsener Speckhas several layers of meat, and half of it is fat; fetter Speck is almost completely fat. Both variants include the skin, called pork rind. The pork rind is too hard to eat, but it is cooked in some traditional German dishes, such as Linsen mit Spätzle or Eintopf, to add its flavors to the food.

== See also ==
- Prosciutto
- List of hams
- List of dried foods
- List of smoked foods
