= Westphalian ham =

German meat

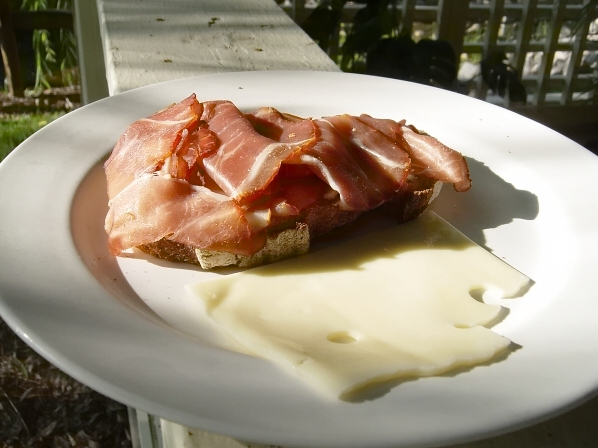
Westphalian ham on bread, with cheese

Westphalian ham (German: Westfälischer Schinken) is a ham that was originally produced from acorn-fed pigs raised in the forests of Westphalia, Germany. The resulting meat is dry cured and then smoked over a mixture of beechwood and juniper branches.

The hams are prepared for consumption solely by the process of smoking, which preserves them, and are typically eaten thinly sliced in their preserved state without additional cooking.

Westphalian ham is famed as a delicacy.

== History ==
During his travels in Germany, Thomas Jefferson documented the production of Westphalian ham and aspects of the hogs used to produce it.

In the early 1900s, there were three varieties of Westphalia ham: kugel cut, boneless and rolled, and regulation ham.

In the early 1900s, significant quantities of Westphalian ham were being exported from Germany into the United States.

== See also ==
- List of hams
- List of smoked foods
- Smoked ham
