= Country ham =

American cured and smoked ham

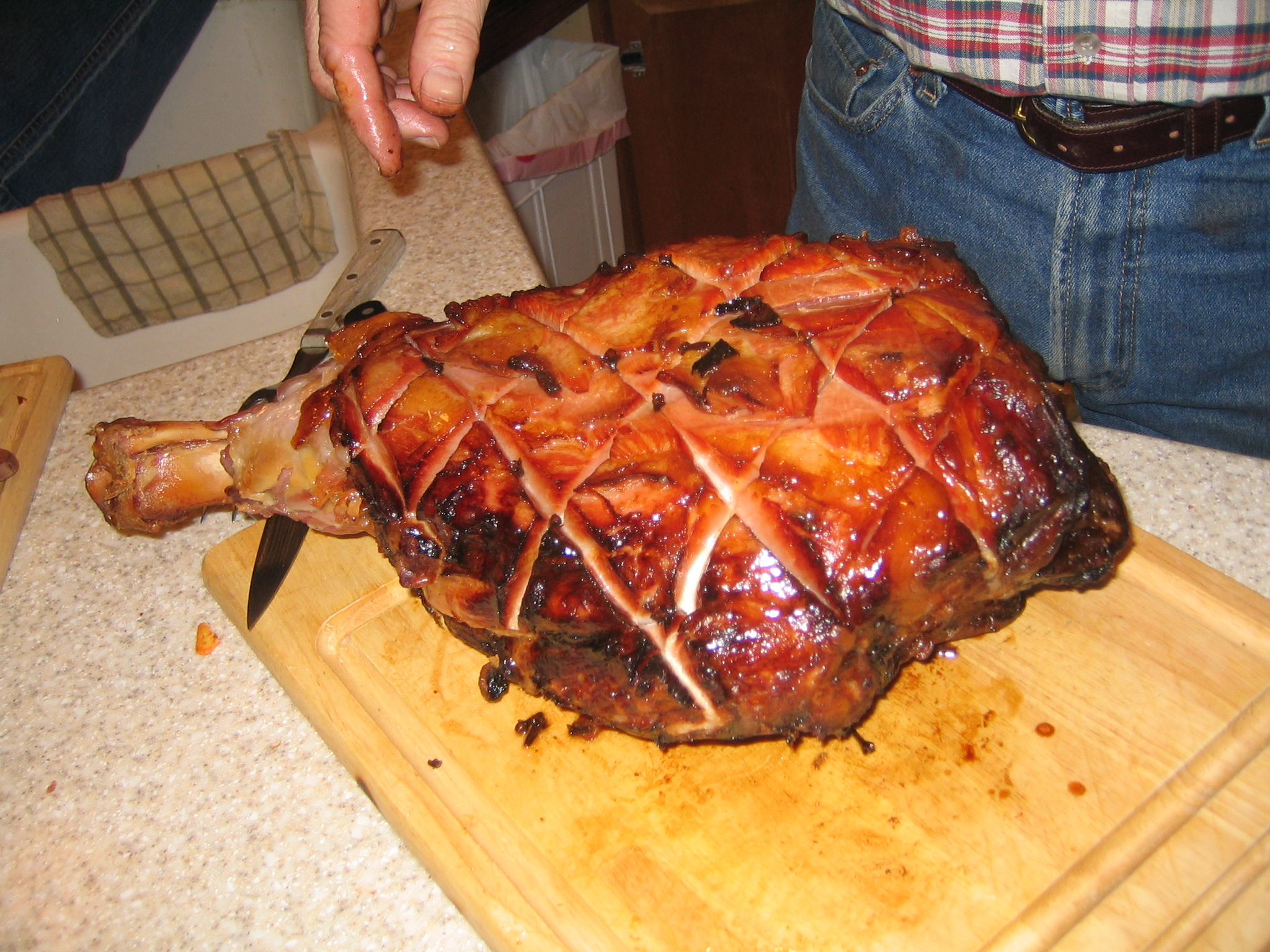
- Baked Kentucky country ham, Christmas 2005
- Type: Meat
- Course: Main course
- Place of origin: Virginia, U.S.
- Similar dishes: Jinhua ham

Country ham is a variety of heavily salted ham preserved by curing and often, but not always, by smoking, associated with the cuisine of the southern United States.

== Production ==
Country hams are salt-cured (with or without nitrites) for one to three months. Usually they are hardwood smoked (usually hickory and red oak), but some types of country ham, such as the "salt-and-pepper ham" of North Carolina, are not smoked. Missouri country hams traditionally incorporate brown sugar in their cure mix and are known to be milder and less salty than hams produced in eastern states including Kentucky and Virginia. After curing they are aged for several months to years, depending on the fat content of the meat.

== See also ==
- Smithfield ham, a type of country ham
- List of dried foods
- List of hams
- List of smoked foods
