= Haybes =

- Commune
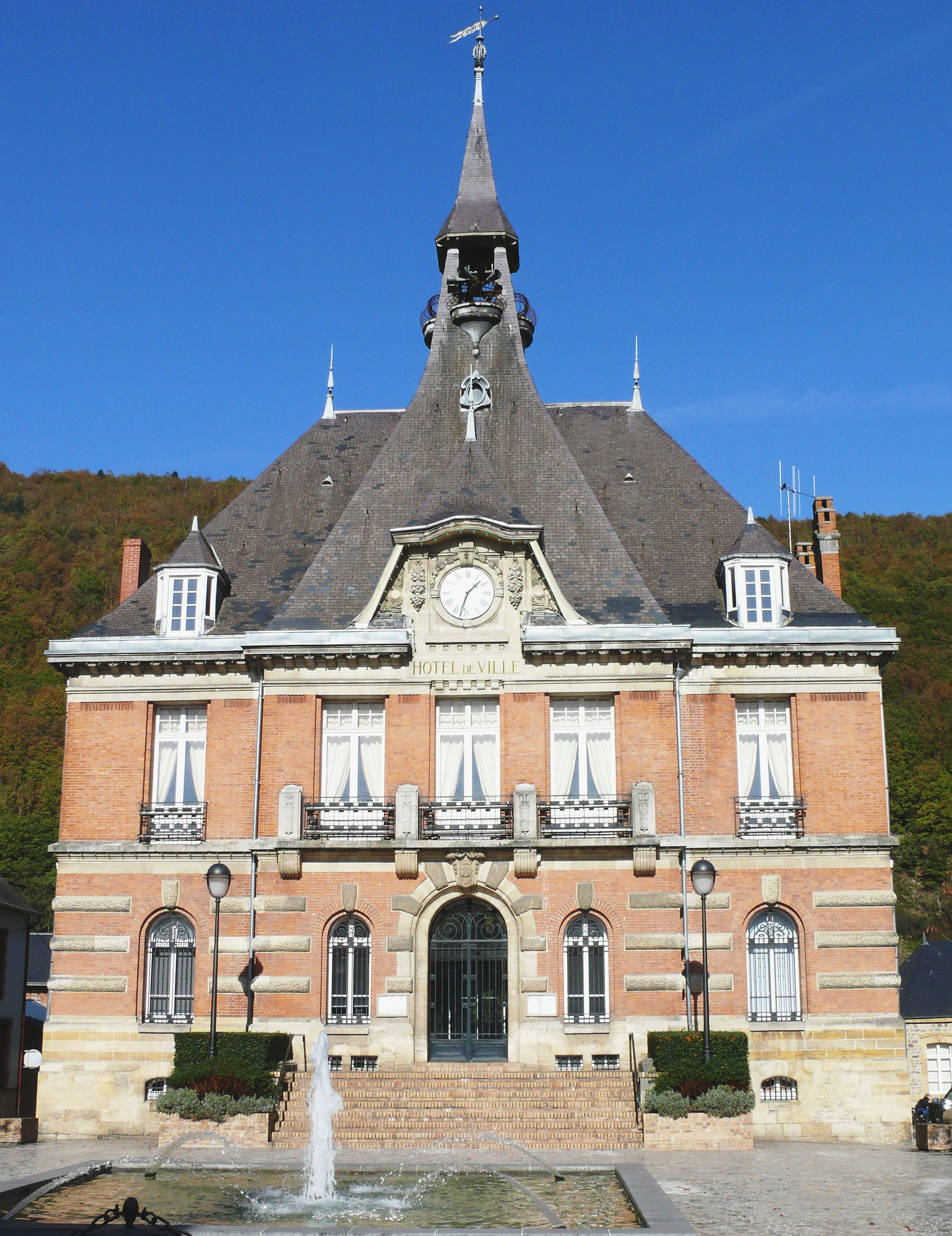
- The town hall in Haybes

- Coat of arms
- Location of Haybes
- Location within France Location within Grand Est
- Coordinates: 50°00′37″N 4°42′24″E
- Country: France
- Region: Grand Est
- Department: Ardennes
- Arrondissement: Charleville-Mézières
- Canton: Revin
- Intercommunality: Ardenne Rives de Meuse

Government
  - Mayor (2020–2026): Jean-Claude Gravier
- Area^{1}: 28.05 km^{2} (10.83 sq mi)
- Elevation: 117 m (384 ft)
- Population (2023): 1,794
  - Density: 63.96/km^{2} (165.6/sq mi)
- Time zone: UTC+01:00 (CET)
  - Summer (DST): UTC+02:00 (CEST)
- INSEE/Postal code: 08222 /08170
- ^{1} French Land Register data, which excludes lakes, ponds, glaciers > 1 km^{2} (0.386 sq mi or 247 acres) and river estuaries.

Haybes (French pronunciation: [ɛb]) is a commune in the Ardennes department in northern France.

== Population ==
Historical population
Year	Pop.	±% p.a.
1968	2,150	—
1975	2,081	−0.46%
1982	2,096	+0.10%
1990	2,071	−0.15%
1999	2,092	+0.11%
2007	2,062	−0.18%
2012	2,039	−0.22%
2017	1,885	−1.56%
2023	1,794	−0.82%
Source: INSEE

== See also ==
- Communes of the Ardennes department
