= Smithfield ham =

Specific form of country ham

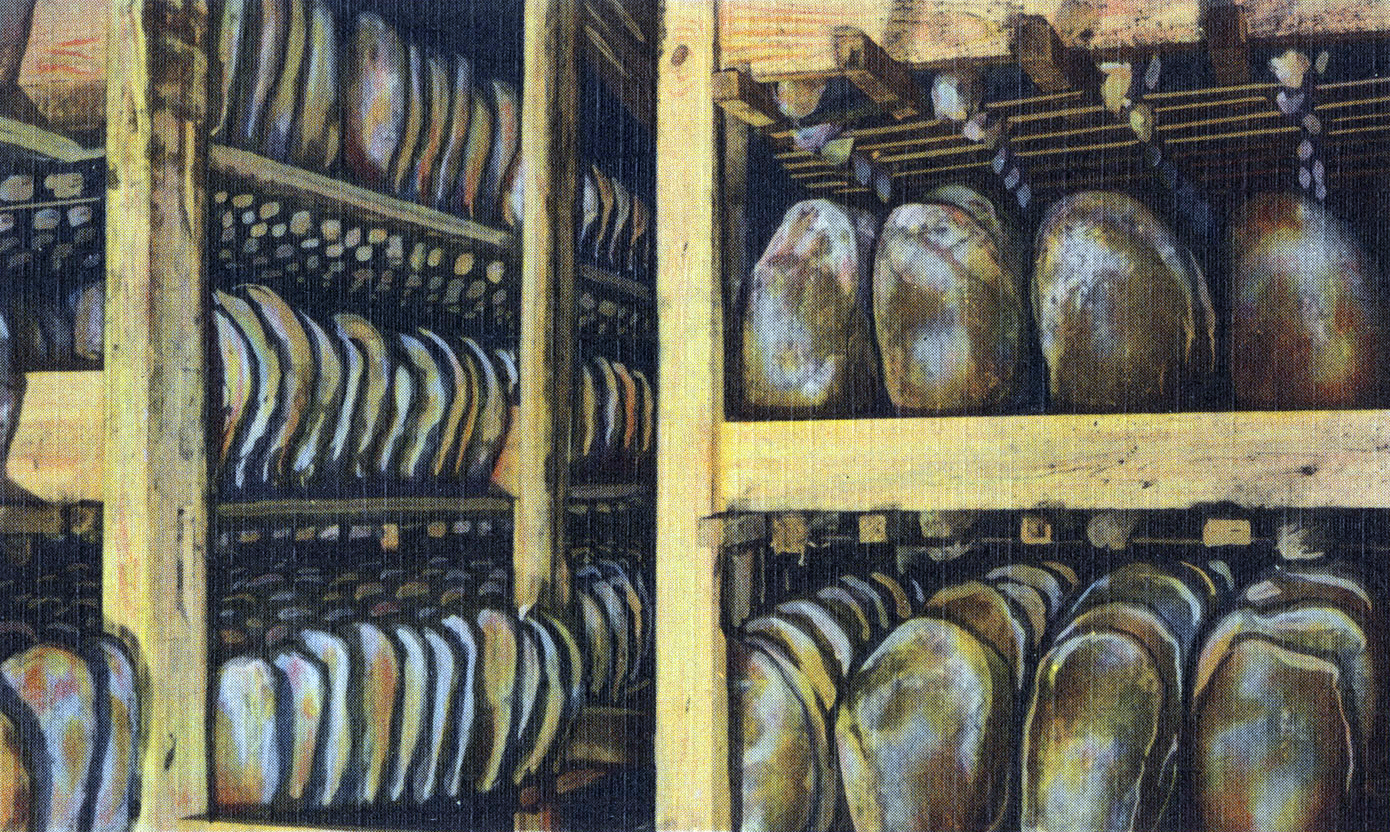
Postcard image of Smithfield hams hung to age

Smithfield ham is a specific form of country ham finish-cured in the town of Smithfield in Isle of Wight County in the Hampton Roads region of Virginia, U.S.

== History ==
The first record of the commercial sale of cured "Smithfield Ham" is a receipt to Ellerston and John Perot on the Dutch Caribbean Island of St Eustatius, dating from 1779.

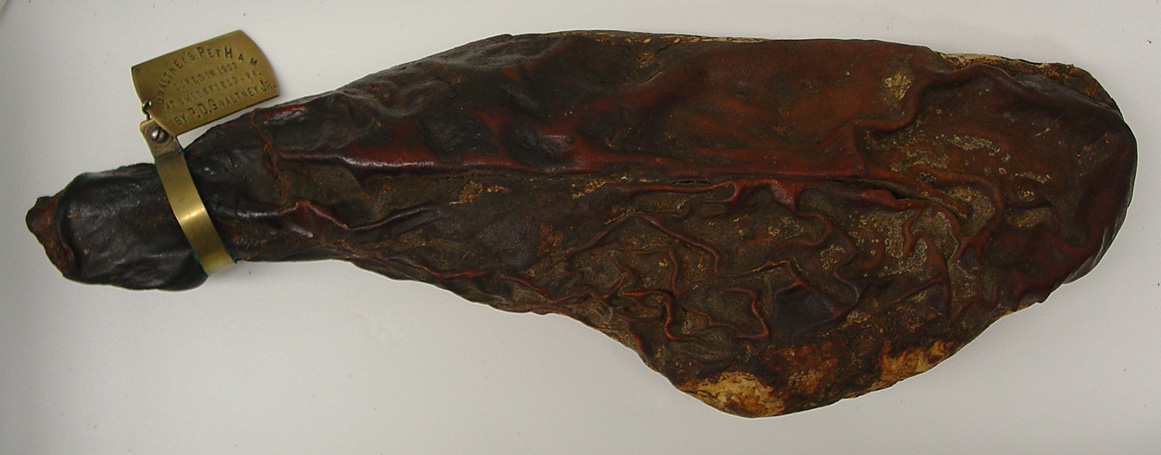
The Isle of Wight County Museum holds P.D. Gwaltney Jr.'s "pet ham". It is thought to be the world's oldest ham, having been cured in 1902.

The Commonwealth of Virginia first regulated usage of the term "Smithfield Ham" in a 1926 Statute passed by its General Assembly stating:

Genuine Smithfield hams [are those] cut from the carcasses of peanut-fed hogs, raised in the peanut-belt of the Commonwealth of Virginia or the State of North Carolina, and which are cured, treated, smoked, and processed in the town of Smithfield, in the Commonwealth of Virginia.

The "peanut-fed" and "peanut-belt" stipulations were removed in 1966. The present statute reads:

...Genuine Smithfield hams are hereby defined to be hams processed, treated, smoked, aged, cured by the long-cure, dry salt method of cure; and, aged for a minimum period of six months; such six-month period to commence when the green pork cut is first introduced to dry salt, all such salting, processing, treating, smoking, curing, and aging to be done within the corporate limits of the town of Smithfield, Virginia

While it is unclear whether the green pork (the raw product of the cured ham) may come from hogs raised and slaughtered in other than Smithfield, Virginia, the statute stipulates that the six-month (minimum duration) curing clock is to begin when the green pork is "introduced to dry salt", and that through the entire duration of the process, the ham and its processing must occur within Smithfield, Virginia. The statute also commands that any richer or more intense cure, obtained from an aging that is in excess of six months, must also be done within Smithfield, Virginia.

Production of Genuine Smithfield ham was discontinued in early 2024, due to reduced demand.

== Gallery ==
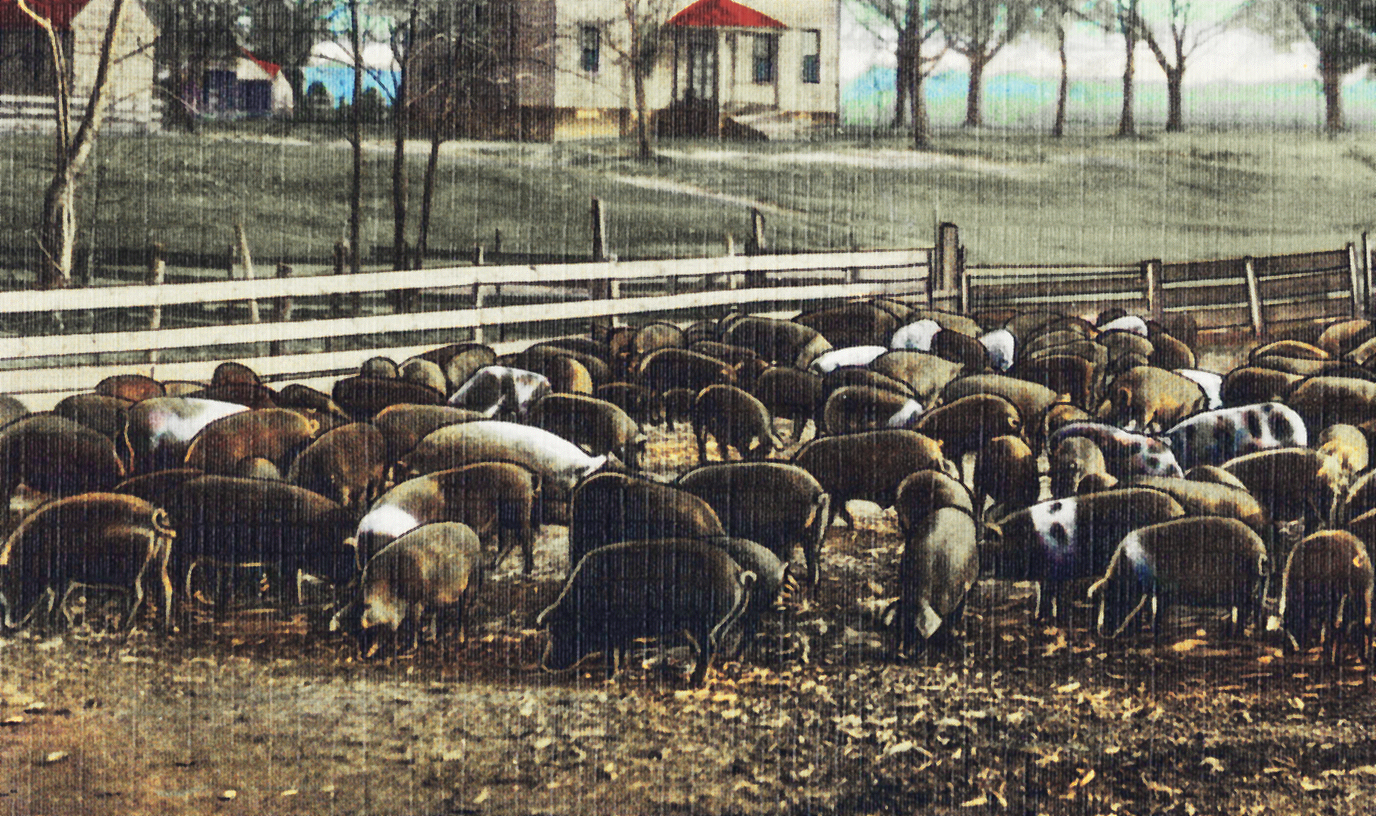
Postcard image of peanut-fed hogs

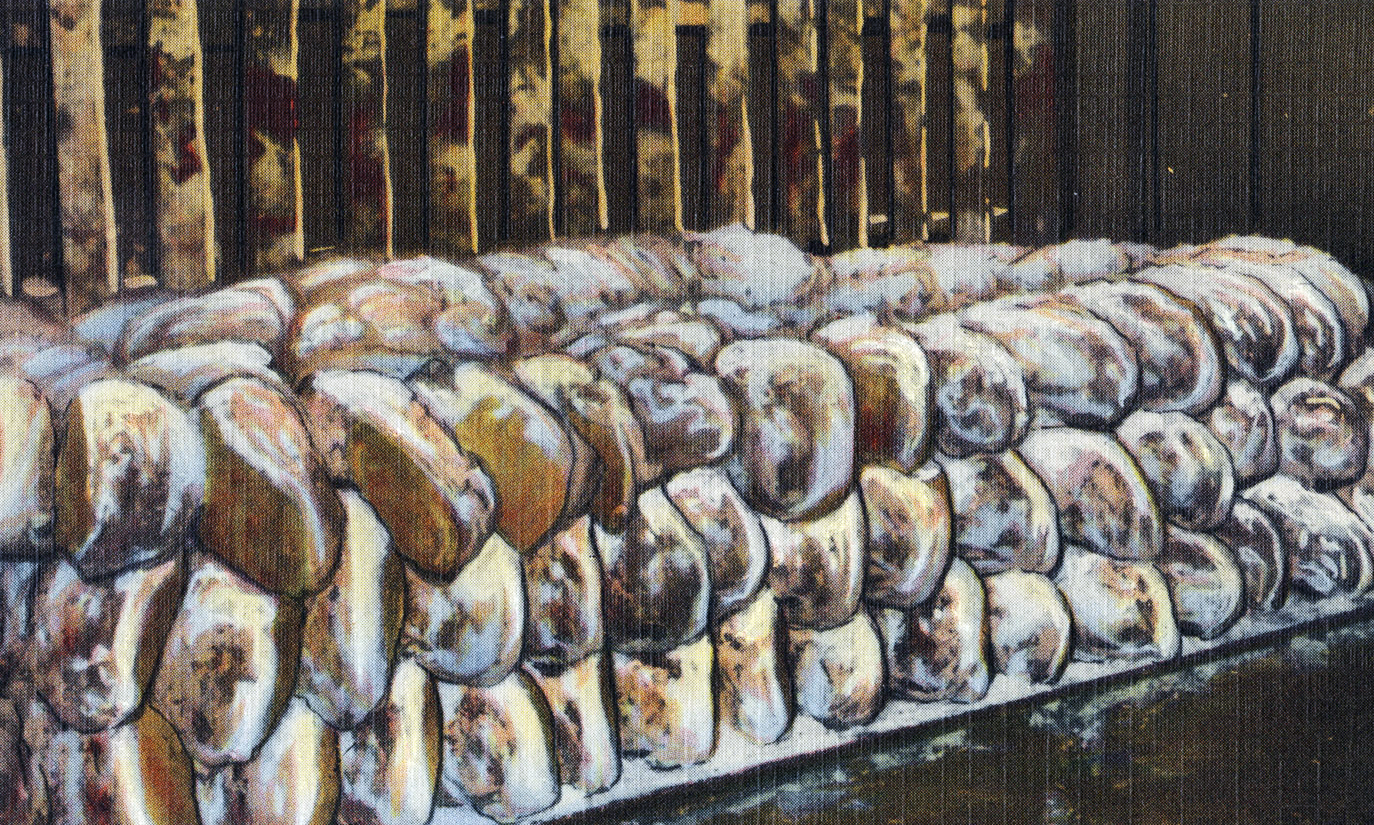
Postcard image of hams in the dry salt process

== See also ==
- List of hams
- List of dried foods
- Jinhua ham
