= Valle d'Aosta Jambon de Bosses =

Spicy cured ham product

Valle d'Aosta Jambon de Bosses or Vallée d'Aoste Jambon de Bosses is a spicy cured ham product from the comune (municipality) of Saint-Rhémy-en-Bosses, in the Aosta Valley, Italy, one of the region's specialties. It was awarded European Union protected designation of origin (PDO) status.

== See also ==
- List of hams
