= Bayonne ham =

French cured ham with protected designation of origin

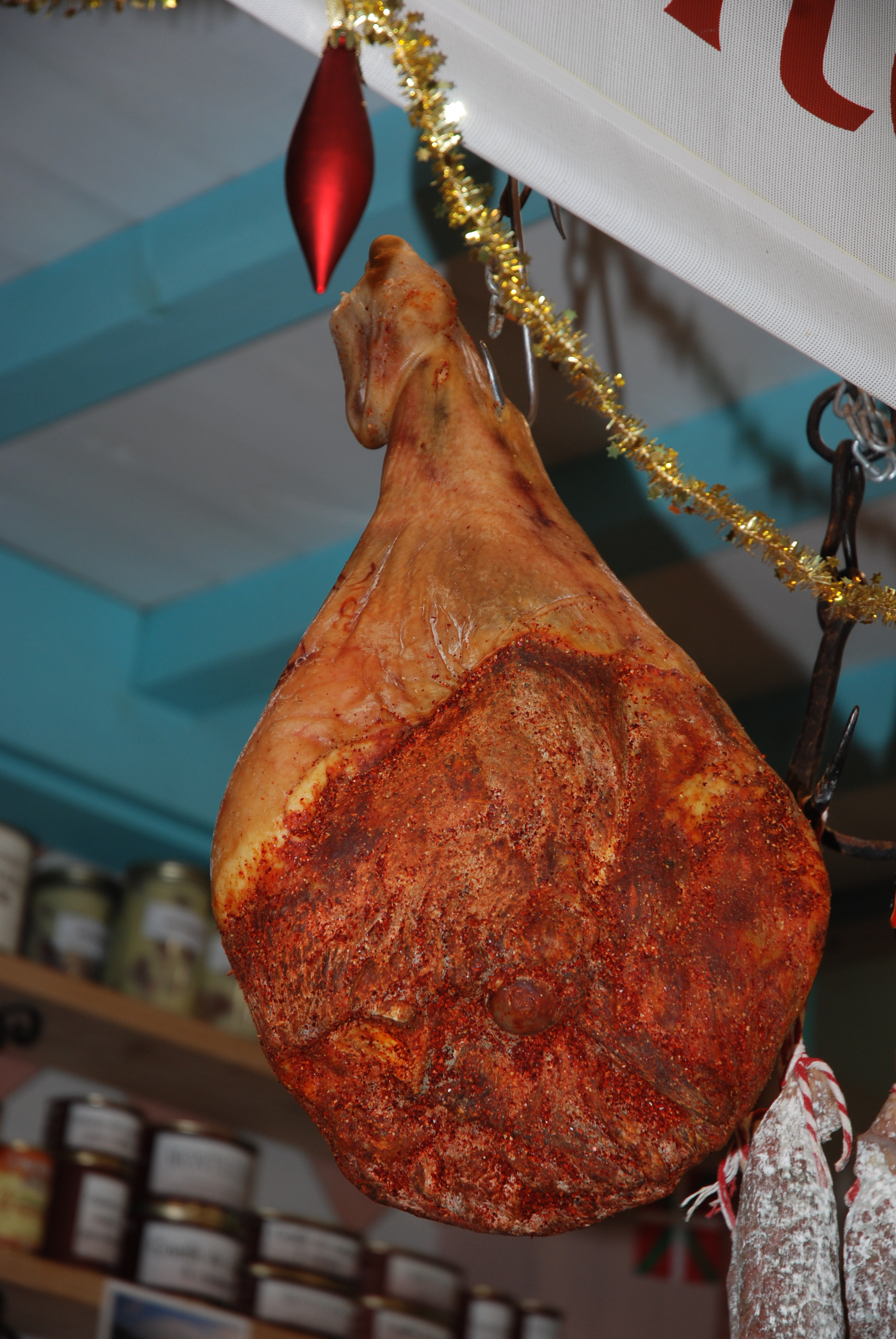
Bayonne ham

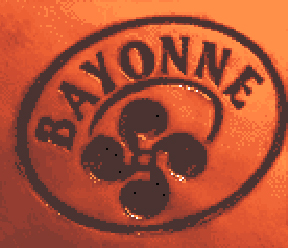
Seal (a lauburu) on every Bayonne ham

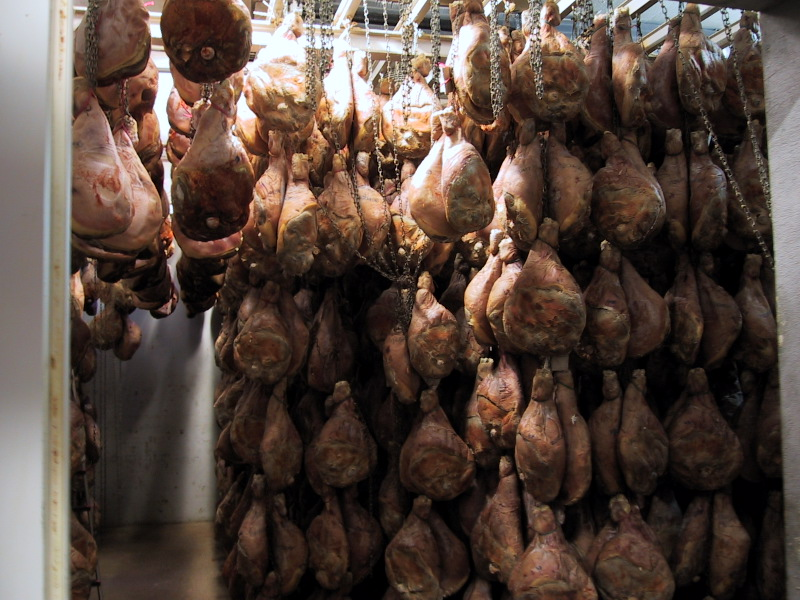
Hams aging in an atmospherically controlled storage room in Mazerolles, Béarn

Bayonne ham or jambon de Bayonne (Occitan: jamon de Bayona Basque: Baionako xingarra) is a cured ham that takes its name from the ancient port city of Bayonne in the far southwest of France, a city located in both the cultural regions of Basque Country and Gascony. It has PGI status.

== Production ==
The area concerned is the basin of the river Adour and this geographical limitation is now enshrined in the regulations for the production of Bayonne ham. The meat itself does not have to come from the Adour basin but has to be produced from one of eight clearly defined breeds of pig reared in an area from Deux-Sèvres in the north to Aveyron and the Aude. The regulations are very strict and cover the zone of origin of the pork, the regime for feeding the animals (no steroids, no fish oils, no antibiotics), and each animal must be clearly and uniquely identifiable with a tattoo. Transport, slaughter, size and weight of the original meat cut, minimum fat cover, linoleic acid content, and the post slaughter storage temperature for the meat are all specified. The ham produced within these criteria is given the European Union PGI status Protected Designation of Origin and as such is called Bayonne ham. Enforcement of these regulations and the granting of the right to use the name Bayonne ham is the responsibility of Le Consortium de Jambon du Bayonne based in Pau, the capital of Department 64 in southwest France.

The drying method used in modern times mimics that used in the past. Each drying storage chamber has temperature and humidity controls set to match seasonal variations. Originally the pigs were slaughtered in late October and early November. The hams were then rubbed in salt produced in the salt pans of the Adour estuary or from those near Béarn. The temperature conditions at this time of year, 6 to 8 °C (43 to 46 °F), are ideal for the initial preserving process and the hams were left hanging in the drying room until the end of January or early February. In the next part of the process, a mixture of pork fat and flour called pannage is used to seal the cut end of the joint. This reduces the speed in which the meat dries out during the warmer months of March, April, and May. At some point during this time many of the producers will also rub a paste of piment d'Espelette (Basque chile pepper) into the skin, giving a unique tang to the end product. The final drying stage is completed by the end of July and the ham is ready. Modern techniques using individual drying chambers with temperature and humidity controls simply reproduce the seasonal temperatures and the changing humidity conditions produced each year by the foehn (southerly wind) and the Atlantic Ocean. The size of ham used is normally within the range of 8 to 9 kg (18 to 20 lb) including bone.

Once the ham has completed its curing process, it is marked with the lauburu (traditional Basque cross), topped with the name Bayonne. The ham is a minimum of 7 months old, with most being 9 or 10 months before it is offered for sale, and it will keep for up to another year if kept in a cool (8 °C), dry atmosphere.

The ham is a slightly sweet, delicately flavoured meat with little salt to the taste. It is generally cut very thin and has a chewy texture in comparison to cooked hams.

== See also ==
- Jamón ibérico
- Jamón serrano
- List of hams
- List of dried foods
- Presunto
- Prosciutto - a general name for similar hams from Italy
