= Alpine cuisine =

Regional cuisine of the Alps

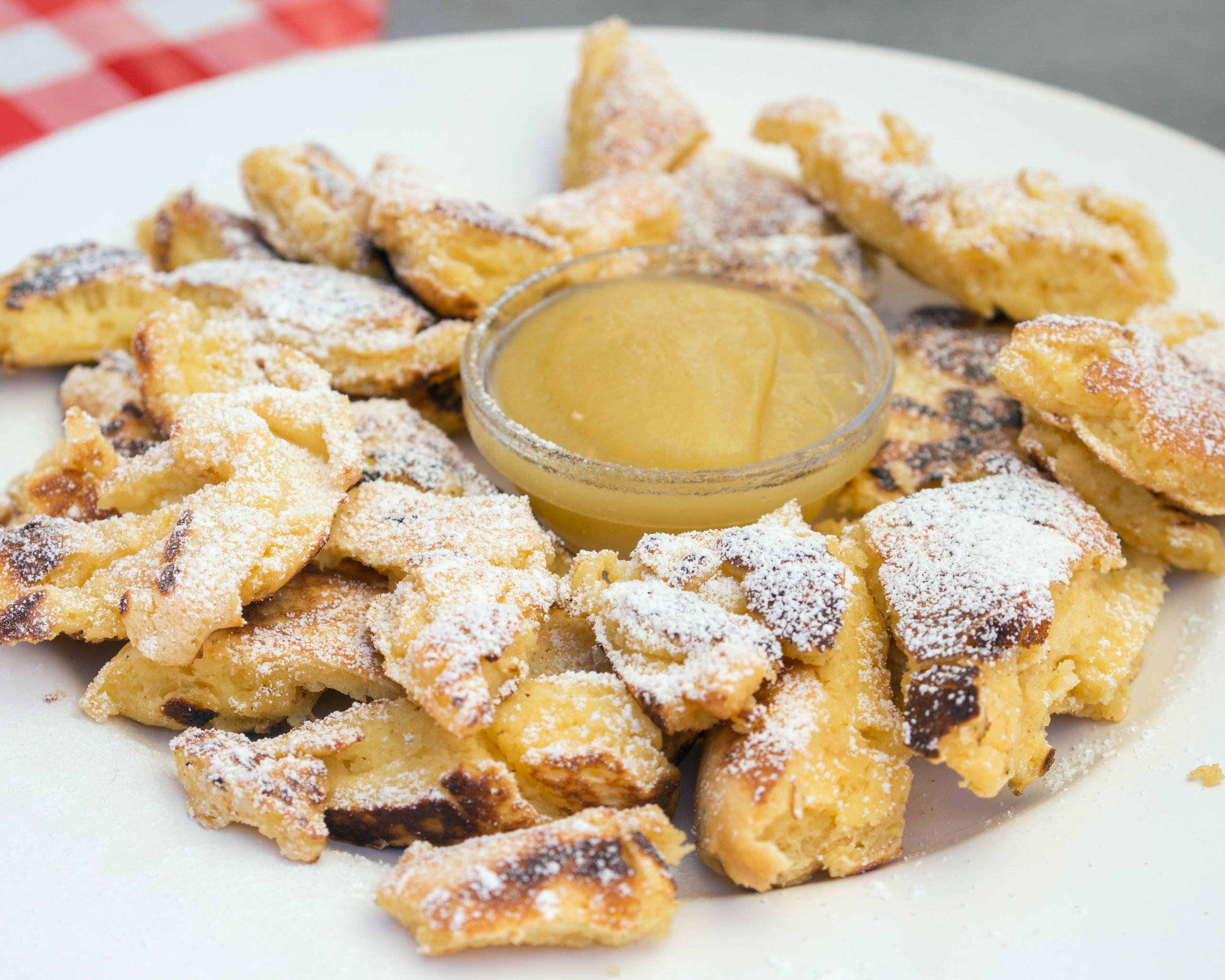
"Kaiserschmarrn"

The regional cuisine of different regions of the Alps is called Alpine cuisine. Despite clear regional differences, this cuisine has been characterised throughout the entire Alpine region for centuries by the isolated rural life on the alpine huts and in the mountain villages. The staple foods that are still available today include milk and dairy products, cereals and desserts, as well as meat preserved by drying and smoking.

== Typical food and beverages ==
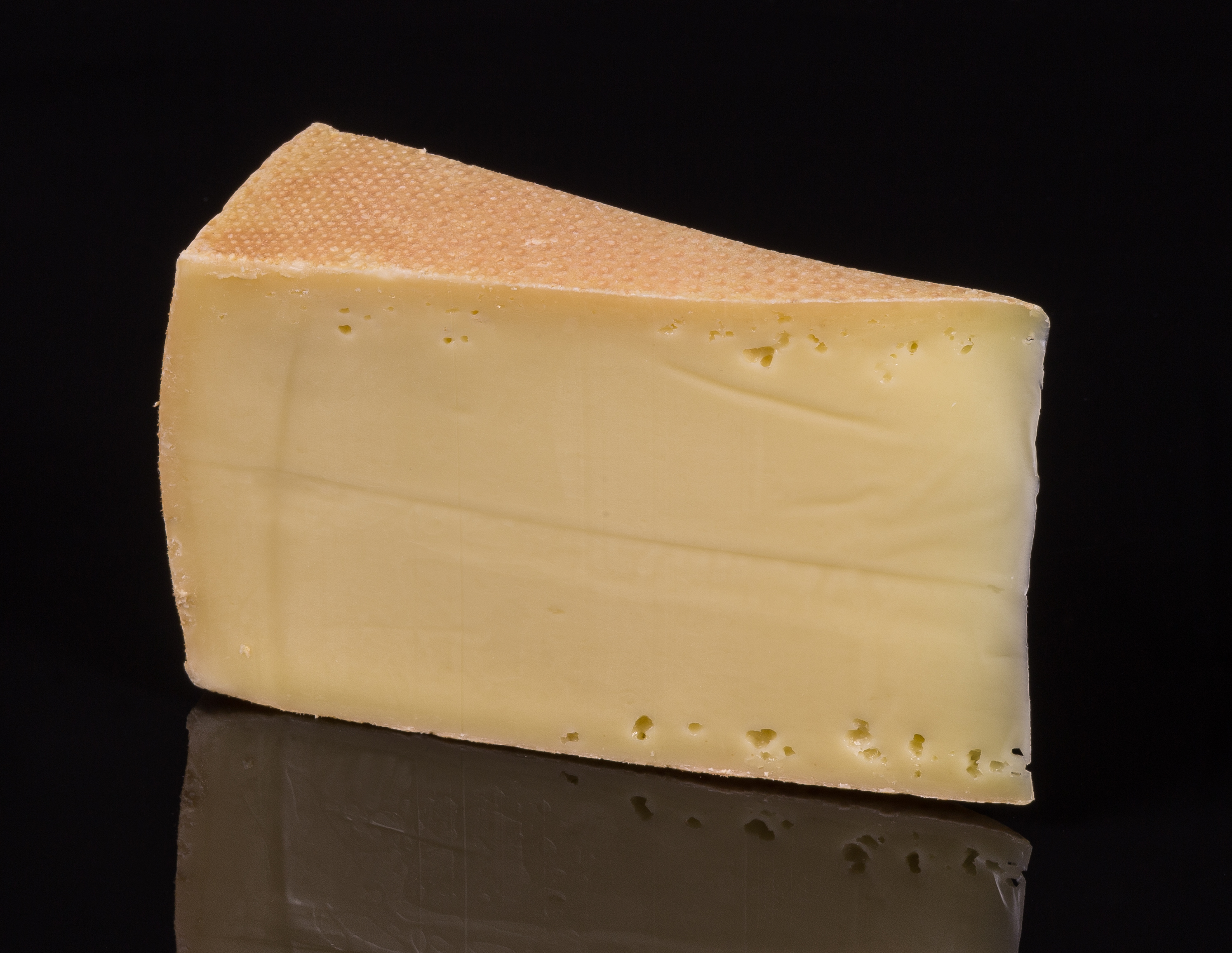
Mountain cheese "Milfina"

=== Dairy and cheese products ===
Milk and dairy products have been a central component of Alpine cuisine for centuries. The typical alpine farming with alpine-specific dual-purpose breeds such as the Simmentaler Fleckvieh (Simmental cattle) or the Tiroler Grauvieh (Tyrol Grey) can be traced back to the beginning of our era: Even the Roman writers Pliny and Strabo reported on the good milk productivity of Alpine cattle ("bos alpinus"). Various Bergkäse varieties from the Alpine region ("caseus helveticus") are also said to have been mentioned by Pliny. In his work Naturalis historia, however, he describes cheese from the Gallic provinces as rather unpopular in Rome and compares the strong taste with that of medicine. In the meantime, cheese production in Switzerland and other Alpine countries has developed considerably: cow's milk cheeses such as Swiss Emmentaler, Allgäuer Bergkäse and French Tomme de Savoie, as well as various soft and hard cheeses made from goat's milk are now internationally known and popular.

=== Bacon, sausage and dried meat ===
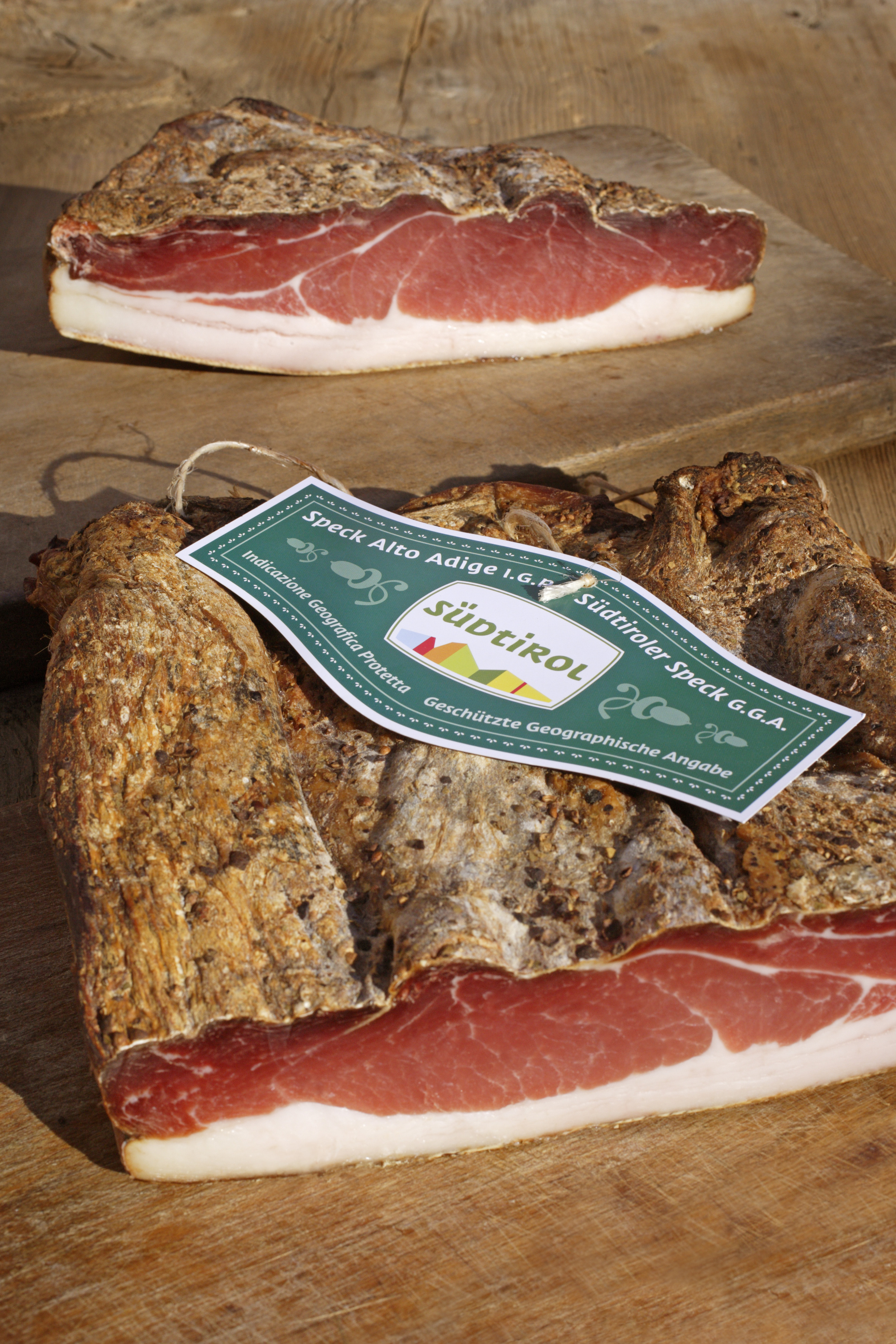
"Südtiroler Speck"

Over the centuries, the widespread use of alpine farming and the need to store meat over the long winter season have brought about a number of long-lasting meat specialities in Alpine cuisine. Many products such as Tyrolean ("Tiroler Speck") and South Tyrolean bacon ("Südtiroler Speck"), Bündnerfleisch and Valais dried meat are now protected as protected designations of origin ("g.g.A."). But other dried meat products such as Kaminwurze also have a firm place in alpine cuisine.

=== Bread, pasta and desserts ===
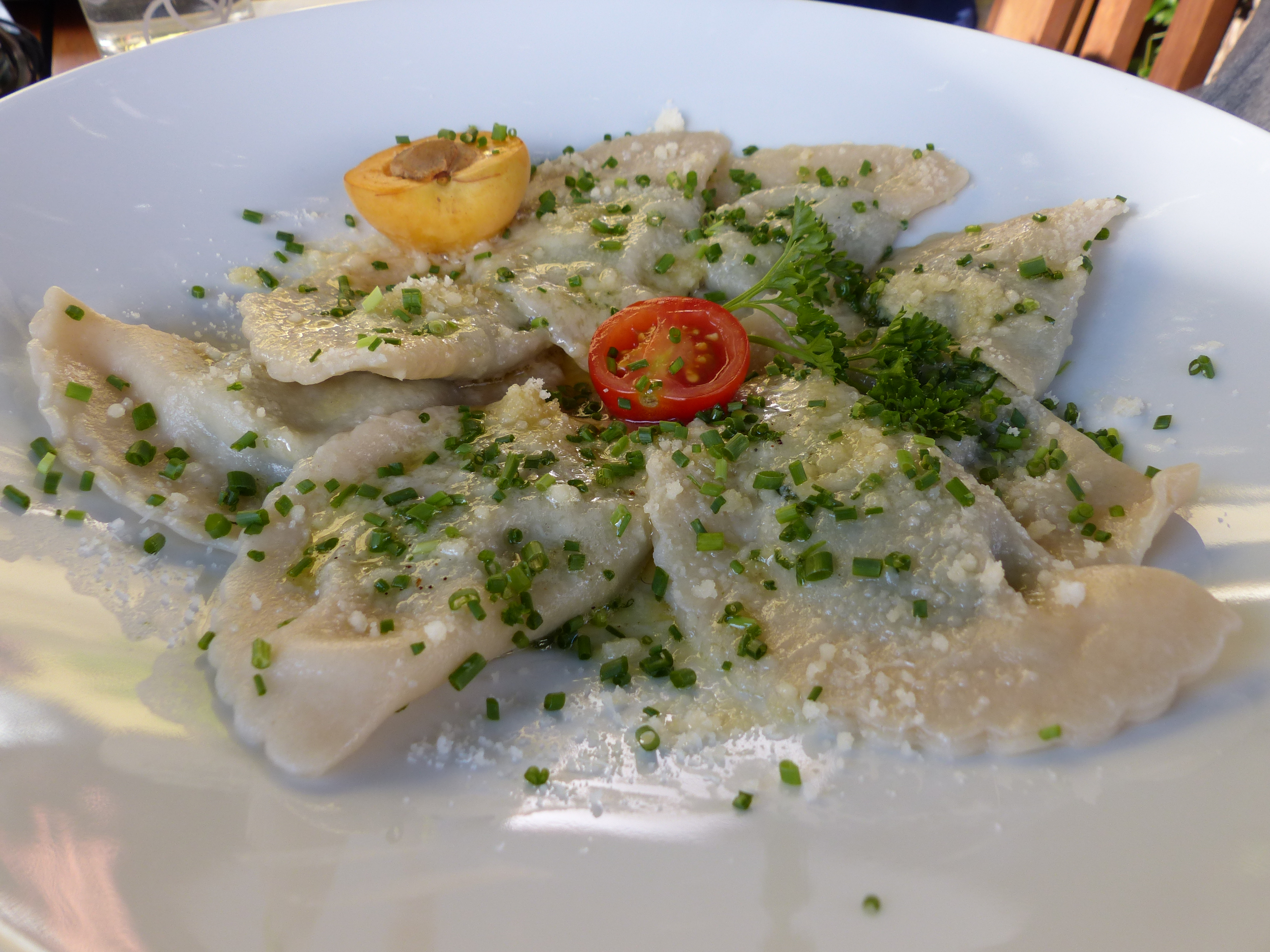
Schlutzkrapfen

The physically hard work of the mountain shepherds and farmers on the mountain huts requires a lot of energy even until today, which can be obtained particularly well from carbohydrate-rich food and side dishes. In addition to well-known dishes such as roll, semolina or Kaiserschmarrn or Bündner barley soup made from typical European cereals such as rye, barley and wheat, robust and undemanding buckwheat also had a firm place in the Alpine cuisine early on. Sciatt, a buckwheat flat bread, and Pizzoccheri (buckwheat noodles) are among the specialities of Veltlin, and in the Slovenian Oberkrain Žganci (equivalent to the Austrian Heidensterz) is a typical poor people's meal made from buckwheat flour. With the introduction of maize in Europe, it also gained in importance in Alpine cuisine and today is mainly found in the form of maize semolina in dishes such as polenta or Riebel.

The typical dishes of the Alpine region also include many variations of baked goods, preferably long-lasting varieties such as the South Tyrolean Schüttelbrot or the Vinschgauer. Particularly in winter, breads and cakes are prepared with dried fruit such as Kletzen - for example Kletzenbrot, which is widespread in Austria and South Tyrol, or Swiss specialities such as Birnbrot and Schlorzifladen. In poor mountain regions, these recipes were often created out of the necessity to stretch expensive bread cereals from the lowlands with dried fruits.

In addition to the specialities already mentioned, the following dishes are also part of the traditional Alpine cuisine:

- Älplermagronen
- Buchteln
- Germknödel
- Kartoffelpaunzen
- Kaspressknödel
- Maluns
- Schlutz- and Schlipfkrapfen
- Spätzle

=== Wine and spirits ===
Due to the climatically convenient location, especially the southern Alpine regions became well known as winegrowing regions. The winegrowing in South Tyrol has a long tradition which can be traced back to pre-Roman times. Valais has a large number of vineyards. Wines from the French and Austrian mountain regions have also been known and popular internationally for a long time.

Other specialities of the Alps include the Swiss Chèvre, the Austrian Zirbenlikör and the Enzianschnaps, of which the knowledge of the locations, harvesting and processing of the roots in the Tyrolean Paznaun was recognised by UNESCO as an intangible cultural heritage in 2013.

== Regional cuisine ==
Due to the large geographical size, the climatic differences and the sparse infrastructure, Alpine cuisine has always been strongly influenced by the local cuisine of the respective countries. For example, sweet chestnuts, which are widely used in French and Italian Alpine cuisine, play only a minor role in the cuisine of the Bavarian and Austrian Alps, while, conversely, Sauerkraut, which is popular in Bavarian cuisine, is not widely used in southern Alpine regions such as Tyrol and South Tyrol.

In addition to the spatial separation, the widespread cultivation of traditions also contributes to the preservation of traditional regional Alpine cuisine. For example, the Association Culinary Heritage of Switzerland, founded in 2004, was able to set up an online Encyclopedia with over 400 Swiss cuisine products, supported by the Federal Office for Agriculture and the Swiss cantons. The Slow Food movement, headquartered in Piedmont, Italy, is also committed to preserving regional diversity and culinary cultures.
