= List of Michelin-starred restaurants in Italy =

As of the 2027 Michelin Guide, there are 382 restaurants in Italy with a Michelin star rating.

The Michelin Guides have been published by the French tire company Michelin since 1900. They were designed as a guide to tell drivers about eateries they recommended to visit and to subtly sponsor their tires, by encouraging drivers to use their cars more and therefore need to replace the tires as they wore out. Over time, the stars that were given out became more valuable.

Multiple anonymous Michelin inspectors visit the restaurants several times. They rate the restaurants on five criteria: "quality of products", "mastery of flavor and cooking techniques", "the personality of the chef represented in the dining experience", "value for money", and "consistency between inspectors' visits". Inspectors have at least ten years of expertise and create a list of popular restaurants supported by media reports, reviews, and diner popularity. If they reach a consensus, Michelin awards restaurants from one to three stars based on its evaluation methodology: one star means "high-quality cooking, worth a stop", two stars signify "excellent cooking, worth a detour", and three stars denote "exceptional cuisine, worth a special journey". The stars are not permanent and restaurants are constantly re-evaluated. If the criteria are not met, the restaurant will lose its stars.

== Abruzzo ==
As of the 2027 Michelin Guide, there are 6 restaurants in Abruzzo with a Michelin star rating.

Key
1 Michelin star	One Michelin star
3 Michelin stars	Three Michelin stars
—	The restaurant did not receive a star that year

Michelin-starred restaurants
Name	Cuisine	Location	2025	2026	2027
Al Metrò	Mediterranean	San Salvo Marina	1 Michelin star	1 Michelin star	1 Michelin star
D.One Restaurant	Italian	Montepagano	1 Michelin star	1 Michelin star	1 Michelin star
La Bandiera	Italian	Civitella Casanova	1 Michelin star	1 Michelin star	1 Michelin star
Reale	Modern	Castel di Sangro	3 Michelin stars	3 Michelin stars	3 Michelin stars
Villa Maiella	Italian	Guardiagrele	1 Michelin star	1 Michelin star	1 Michelin star
Zunica 1880	Italian	Sant'Omero	—	1 Michelin star	1 Michelin star
Reference(s)					

== Aosta Valley ==
As of the 2027 Michelin Guide, there are 4 restaurants in the Aosta Valley with a Michelin star rating.

Key
1 Michelin star	One Michelin star
—	The restaurant did not receive a star that year

Michelin-starred restaurants
Name	Cuisine	Location	2025	2026	2027
Le Petit Bellevue	Italian	Cogne	—	1 Michelin star	1 Michelin star
Paolo Griffa al Caffè Nazionale	Italian	Aosta	1 Michelin star	1 Michelin star	1 Michelin star
Vecchio Ristoro	Italian	Aosta	1 Michelin star	1 Michelin star	1 Michelin star
Wood	Creative	Breuil Cervinia	1 Michelin star	1 Michelin star	1 Michelin star
Reference(s)					

== Apulia ==
As of the 2027 Michelin Guide, there are 9 restaurants in Apulia with a Michelin star rating.

Key
1 Michelin star	One Michelin star
—	The restaurant did not receive a star that year

Michelin-starred restaurants
Name	Cuisine	Location	2025	2026	2027
Angelo Sabatelli	Modern	Putignano	1 Michelin star	1 Michelin star	1 Michelin star
Bros'	Creative	Martina Franca	—	—	1 Michelin star
Casa Sgarra	Modern	Trani	1 Michelin star	1 Michelin star	1 Michelin star
Casamatta	Modern	Manduria	1 Michelin star	1 Michelin star	—
Casanova	Mediterranean	Polignano a Mare	—	—	1 Michelin star
Dissapore di Andrea Catalano	Italian	Carovigno	1 Michelin star	1 Michelin star	1 Michelin star
Due Camini	Vegetarian	Savelletri	1 Michelin star	1 Michelin star	1 Michelin star
Pashà	Italian	Carovigno	1 Michelin star	1 Michelin star	1 Michelin star
Porta di Basso	Creative	Peschici	1 Michelin star	—	—
Primo Restaurant	Mediterranean	Lecce	1 Michelin star	1 Michelin star	1 Michelin star
Quintessenza	Modern	Trani	1 Michelin star	1 Michelin star	1 Michelin star
Reference(s)					

== Basilicata ==
As of the 2027 Michelin Guide, there is 1 restaurant in Basilicata with a Michelin star rating.

Key
1 Michelin star	One Michelin star
Closed	The restaurant is no longer open

Michelin-starred restaurants
Name	Cuisine	Location	2025	2026	2027
Vitantonio Lombardo	Creative	Matera	1 Michelin star	1 Michelin star	1 Michelin star
Don Alfonso 1890 (San Barbato)	Italian	Lavello	1 Michelin star	1 Michelin star	Closed
Reference(s)					

== Calabria ==
As of the 2027 Michelin Guide, there are 5 restaurants in Calabria with a Michelin star rating.

Key
1 Michelin star	One Michelin star
—	The restaurant did not receive a star that year
Closed	The restaurant is no longer open

Michelin-starred restaurants
Name	Cuisine	Location	2025	2026	2027
Abbruzzino	Mediterranean	Catanzaro	1 Michelin star	—	—
Abbruzzino Oltre	Mediterranean	Lamezia Terme	1 Michelin star	1 Michelin star	1 Michelin star
Dattilo	Italian	Strongoli	1 Michelin star	1 Michelin star	1 Michelin star
Gambero Rosso	Seafood	Marina di Gioiosa Ionica	1 Michelin star	1 Michelin star	1 Michelin star
Hyle	Italian	San Giovanni in Fiore	1 Michelin star	1 Michelin star	1 Michelin star
Luigi Lepore	Italian	Lamezia Terme	1 Michelin star	—	Closed
Qafiz	Italian	Santa Cristina d'Aspromonte	1 Michelin star	1 Michelin star	1 Michelin star
Reference(s)					

== Campania ==
As of the 2027 Michelin Guide, there are 48 restaurants in Campania with a Michelin star rating, which includes the city of Naples.

Key
1 Michelin star	One Michelin star
2 Michelin stars	Two Michelin stars
3 Michelin stars	Three Michelin stars
—	The restaurant did not receive a star that year
Closed	The restaurant is no longer open

Michelin-starred restaurants
Name	Cuisine	Location	2025	2026	2027
Alain Ducasse Napoli	French	Naples – Portanova	—	1 Michelin star	1 Michelin star
Alici	Italian	Amalfi	1 Michelin star	1 Michelin star	1 Michelin star
Antica Osteria Nonna Rosa	Italian	Vico Equense	1 Michelin star	1 Michelin star	1 Michelin star
ARIA	Contemporary	Naples – Portanova	1 Michelin star	1 Michelin star	1 Michelin star
Bluh Furore	Mediterranean	Furore	1 Michelin star	1 Michelin star	1 Michelin star
Cannavacciuolo Countryside	Mediterranean	Ticciano	1 Michelin star	1 Michelin star	1 Michelin star
Caracol	Mediterranean	Bacoli	1 Michelin star	1 Michelin star	1 Michelin star
Cetaria	Italian	Baronissi	1 Michelin star	1 Michelin star	1 Michelin star
Contaminazioni	Japanese	Somma Vesuviana	1 Michelin star	1 Michelin star	Closed
Daní Maison	Creative	Ischia	2 Michelin stars	2 Michelin stars	2 Michelin stars
Don Alfonso 1890	Italian	Sant'Agata sui Due Golfi	1 Michelin star	1 Michelin star	1 Michelin star
Don Geppi	Creative	Sant'Agnello	1 Michelin star	1 Michelin star	1 Michelin star
George	Contemporary	Naples – Vomero	2 Michelin stars	2 Michelin stars	2 Michelin stars
Glicine	Mediterranean	Amalfi	1 Michelin star	1 Michelin star	1 Michelin star
Il Buco	Mediterranean	Sorrento	1 Michelin star	1 Michelin star	1 Michelin star
Il Flauto di Pan	Creative	Ravello	1 Michelin star	1 Michelin star	1 Michelin star
Il Papavero	Italian	Eboli	1 Michelin star	1 Michelin star	1 Michelin star
Il Refettorio	Mediterranean	Conca dei Marini	1 Michelin star	1 Michelin star	1 Michelin star
Indaco	Seafood	Lacco Ameno	1 Michelin star	1 Michelin star	1 Michelin star
Josè	Italian	Torre del Greco	1 Michelin star	—	—
Krèsios	Creative	Telese	2 Michelin stars	2 Michelin stars	2 Michelin stars
L'Olivo	Italian	Anacapri	2 Michelin stars	2 Michelin stars	2 Michelin stars
La Caravella dal 1959	Italian	Amalfi	1 Michelin star	1 Michelin star	1 Michelin star
La Locanda del Borgo	Italian	Telese	1 Michelin star	1 Michelin star	1 Michelin star
Le Trabe	Italian	Paestum	1 Michelin star	1 Michelin star	1 Michelin star
Le Monzu	Contemporary	Capri	1 Michelin star	1 Michelin star	1 Michelin star
Li Galli	Italian	Positano	1 Michelin star	1 Michelin star	1 Michelin star
Lorelei	Mediterranean	Sorrento	1 Michelin star	1 Michelin star	1 Michelin star
Maeba	Italian	Ariano Irpino	1 Michelin star	1 Michelin star	1 Michelin star
Marotta	Modern	Squille	1 Michelin star	1 Michelin star	1 Michelin star
Maxi	Mediterranean	Vico Equense	—	—	1 Michelin star
O Me O Il Mare	Italian	Gragnano	1 Michelin star	1 Michelin star	1 Michelin star
Oasis	Italian	Vallesaccarda	1 Michelin star	1 Michelin star	1 Michelin star
Osteria Arbustico	Italian	Paestum	1 Michelin star	Closed	1 Michelin star
Piazzetta Milù	Creative	Castellammare di Stabia	2 Michelin stars	2 Michelin stars	2 Michelin stars
President	Mediterranean	Pompei	1 Michelin star	1 Michelin star	1 Michelin star
Quattro Passi	Mediterranean	Nerano	3 Michelin stars	3 Michelin stars	Closed
Re Mauri	Italian	Salerno	1 Michelin star	Closed	
Re Santi e Leoni	Contemporary	Nola	1 Michelin star	1 Michelin star	1 Michelin star
Relais Blu	Mediterranean	Massa Lubrense	1 Michelin star	1 Michelin star	1 Michelin star
Rossellinis	Mediterranean	Ravello	1 Michelin star	1 Michelin star	1 Michelin star
Sensi	Mediterranean	Amalfi	1 Michelin star	1 Michelin star	1 Michelin star
Sud	Italian	Quarto	1 Michelin star	Closed	
Taverna del Capitano	Creative	Marina del Cantone	1 Michelin star	1 Michelin star	1 Michelin star
Taverna Estia	Contemporary	Brusciano	2 Michelin stars	2 Michelin stars	2 Michelin stars
Terrazza Bosquet	Creative	Sorrento	1 Michelin star	1 Michelin star	1 Michelin star
Tre Olivi	Italian	Paestum	1 Michelin star	1 Michelin star	1 Michelin star
Torre del Saracino	Creative	Vico Equense	2 Michelin stars	2 Michelin stars	2 Michelin stars
Umberto a Mare	Seafood	Forio	—	1 Michelin star	1 Michelin star
Un Piano nel Cielo	Mediterranean	Praiano	1 Michelin star	1 Michelin star	1 Michelin star
Veritas	Italian	Naples – Vomero	1 Michelin star	1 Michelin star	1 Michelin star
Volta del Fuenti	Creative	Vietri sul Mare	1 Michelin star	1 Michelin star	1 Michelin star
Zass	Mediterranean	Positano	1 Michelin star	1 Michelin star	1 Michelin star
Reference(s)					

== Emilia-Romagna ==
As of the 2027 Michelin Guide, there are 24 restaurants in Emilia-Romagna with a Michelin star rating.

Key
1 Michelin star	One Michelin star
2 Michelin stars	Two Michelin stars
3 Michelin stars	Three Michelin stars
—	The restaurant did not receive a star that year

Michelin-starred restaurants
Name	Cuisine	Location	2025	2026	2027
Abocar Due Cucine	Argentine	Rimini	1 Michelin star	1 Michelin star	1 Michelin star
Al Gatto Verde	Contemporary	Modena	1 Michelin star	1 Michelin star	2 Michelin stars
Alto	Creative	Fiorano Modenese	1 Michelin star	1 Michelin star	1 Michelin star
Ancòra	Italian	Cesenatico	1 Michelin star	1 Michelin star	1 Michelin star
Antica Corte Pallavicina	Italian	Polesine Parmense	1 Michelin star	1 Michelin star	1 Michelin star
Arnaldo - Clinica Gastronomica	Italian	Rubiera	1 Michelin star	—	—
Ca' Matilde	Italian	Rubbianino	1 Michelin star	1 Michelin star	1 Michelin star
Casa Mazzucchelli	Creative	Sasso Marconi	1 Michelin star	1 Michelin star	1 Michelin star
Cavallino	Italian	Maranello	—	1 Michelin star	1 Michelin star
Da Gorini	Italian	San Piero in Bagno	1 Michelin star	1 Michelin star	1 Michelin star
Da Lucio	Seafood	Rimini	—	1 Michelin star	1 Michelin star
Guido	Seafood	Rimini	1 Michelin star	1 Michelin star	1 Michelin star
I Portici	Creative	Bologna	1 Michelin star	1 Michelin star	1 Michelin star
Iacobucci	Italian	Castel Maggiore	1 Michelin star	1 Michelin star	1 Michelin star
Il Piastrino	Italian	Pennabilli	1 Michelin star	1 Michelin star	1 Michelin star
Inkiostro	Creative	Parma	1 Michelin star	1 Michelin star	1 Michelin star
L'Erba del Re	Creative	Modena	1 Michelin star	1 Michelin star	1 Michelin star
La Buca	Seafood	Cesenatico	1 Michelin star	1 Michelin star	1 Michelin star
La Palta	Italian	Borgonovo Val Tidone	1 Michelin star	1 Michelin star	1 Michelin star
La Zanzara	Seafood	Codigoro	1 Michelin star	1 Michelin star	—
Magnolia	Creative	Longiano	2 Michelin stars	2 Michelin stars	2 Michelin stars
Osteria del Viandante	Italian	Rubiera	1 Michelin star	1 Michelin star	1 Michelin star
Osteria Francescana	Italian	Modena	3 Michelin stars	3 Michelin stars	3 Michelin stars
Ristorante del Lago	Italian	Bagno di Romagna	1 Michelin star	1 Michelin star	1 Michelin star
San Domenico	Italian	Imola	2 Michelin stars	2 Michelin stars	1 Michelin star
Trattoria da Amerigo	Italian	Savigno	1 Michelin star	1 Michelin star	1 Michelin star
Reference(s)					

== Friuli Venezia Giulia ==
As of the 2027 Michelin Guide, there are 7 restaurants in Friuli Venezia Giulia with a Michelin star rating.

Key
1 Michelin star	One Michelin star
2 Michelin stars	Two Michelin stars

Michelin-starred restaurants
Name	Cuisine	Location	2025	2026	2027
Agli Amici	Creative	Godia	2 Michelin stars	2 Michelin stars	2 Michelin stars
Harry's Piccolo	Italian	Trieste	2 Michelin stars	2 Michelin stars	2 Michelin stars
L'Argine a Vencò	Italian	Dolegna del Collio	1 Michelin star	1 Michelin star	1 Michelin star
Laite	Italian	Sappada	1 Michelin star	1 Michelin star	1 Michelin star
La Primula	Italian	San Quirino	1 Michelin star	1 Michelin star	1 Michelin star
Osteria Altran	Italian	Ruda	1 Michelin star	1 Michelin star	1 Michelin star
Trattoria al Cacciatore – La Subida	Italian	Cormons	1 Michelin star	1 Michelin star	1 Michelin star
Reference(s)					

== Lazio ==
As of the 2027 Michelin Guide, there are 33 restaurants in Lazio with a Michelin star rating, which includes the city of Rome.

Key
1 Michelin star	One Michelin star
2 Michelin stars	Two Michelin stars
3 Michelin stars	Three Michelin stars
—	The restaurant did not receive a star that year

Michelin-starred restaurants
Name	Cuisine	Location	2025	2026	2027
Achilli al Parlamento	Creative	Rome – Campo Marzio	1 Michelin star	1 Michelin star	1 Michelin star
Acqua Pazza	Seafood	Ponza	1 Michelin star	1 Michelin star	1 Michelin star
Acquolina	Creative	Rome – Campo Marzio	2 Michelin stars	2 Michelin stars	2 Michelin stars
Al Madrigale	Italian	Tivoli	—	1 Michelin star	1 Michelin star
All'Oro	Italian	Rome – Campo Marzio	1 Michelin star	1 Michelin star	1 Michelin star
Antonello Colonna Labico	Italian	Labico	1 Michelin star	1 Michelin star	1 Michelin star
Aroma	Modern	Rome – Monti	1 Michelin star	1 Michelin star	1 Michelin star
Colline Ciociare	Italian	Acuto	1 Michelin star	1 Michelin star	—
Enoteca La Torre	Italian	Rome – Della Vittoria	2 Michelin stars	2 Michelin stars	2 Michelin stars
Glass Hosteria	Creative	Rome – Trastevere	1 Michelin star	1 Michelin star	1 Michelin star
Idylio	Italian	Rome – Sant'Eustachio	1 Michelin star	1 Michelin star	1 Michelin star
Il Convivio Troiani	Italian	Rome – Ponte	1 Michelin star	1 Michelin star	1 Michelin star
Il Pagliaccio	Mediterranean	Rome – Ponte	2 Michelin stars	2 Michelin stars	2 Michelin stars
Il Tino	Creative	Fiumicino	1 Michelin star	1 Michelin star	1 Michelin star
Imàgo	Italian	Rome – Campo Marzio	1 Michelin star	1 Michelin star	1 Michelin star
INEO	Fusion	Rome – Castro Pretorio	—	1 Michelin star	1 Michelin star
La Parolina	Italian	Trevinano	1 Michelin star	1 Michelin star	1 Michelin star
La Pergola	Mediterranean	Rome – Trionfale	3 Michelin stars	3 Michelin stars	3 Michelin stars
La Terrazza	Mediterranean	Rome – Ludovisi	—	1 Michelin star	1 Michelin star
La Trota	Italian	Rivodutri	1 Michelin star	1 Michelin star	1 Michelin star
Marco Bottega	Creative	Genazzano	1 Michelin star	1 Michelin star	1 Michelin star
Marco Martini	Italian	Rome – San Saba	1 Michelin star	1 Michelin star	1 Michelin star
Mater1apr1ma	Italian	Pontinia	1 Michelin star	1 Michelin star	1 Michelin star
Moma	Italian	Rome – Ludovisi	1 Michelin star	1 Michelin star	1 Michelin star
N'uovo Vino e Cucina	Italian	Sutri	—	—	1 Michelin star
Nomos Ante	Italian	Rome – Regola	—	—	1 Michelin star
Orma Roma	Colombian	Rome – Ludovisi	1 Michelin star	1 Michelin star	2 Michelin stars
Pascucci al Porticciolo	Seafood	Fiumicino	1 Michelin star	1 Michelin star	2 Michelin stars
Per Me Giulio Terrinoni	Italian	Rome – Regola	1 Michelin star	1 Michelin star	1 Michelin star
Pipero Roma	Italian	Rome – Parione	1 Michelin star	1 Michelin star	1 Michelin star
Pulejo	Italian	Rome – Prati	1 Michelin star	1 Michelin star	1 Michelin star
Quid	Creative	Rome – Campo Marzio	—	—	1 Michelin star
Sintesi	Contemporary	Ariccia	1 Michelin star	1 Michelin star	1 Michelin star
Zia	Innovative	Rome – Trastevere	1 Michelin star	1 Michelin star	1 Michelin star
Reference(s)					

== Liguria ==
As of the 2027 Michelin Guide, there are 9 restaurants in Liguria with a Michelin star rating.

Key
1 Michelin star	One Michelin star
—	The restaurant did not receive a star that year
Closed	The restaurant is no longer open

Michelin-starred restaurants
Name	Cuisine	Location	2025	2026	2027
Balzi Rossi	Italian	Ventimiglia	1 Michelin star	Closed	
Casa Buono	Italian	Ventimiglia	1 Michelin star	1 Michelin star	1 Michelin star
Cracco Portofino	Seafood	Portofino	—	1 Michelin star	—
Equilibrio	Italian	Dolcedo	1 Michelin star	1 Michelin star	1 Michelin star
Il Marin	Seafood	Genoa	1 Michelin star	1 Michelin star	1 Michelin star
Impronta d'Acqua	Italian	Cavi di Lavagna	1 Michelin star	1 Michelin star	1 Michelin star
Nove	Italian	Alassio	1 Michelin star	1 Michelin star	1 Michelin star
Paolo e Barbara	Italian	San Remo	1 Michelin star	1 Michelin star	—
Rezzano Cucina e Vino	Mediterranean	Sestri Levante	—	1 Michelin star	1 Michelin star
San Giorgio	Italian	Genoa	1 Michelin star	1 Michelin star	1 Michelin star
Sarri	Seafood	Imperia	1 Michelin star	1 Michelin star	1 Michelin star
The Cook	Italian	Genoa	1 Michelin star	—	Closed
Vescovado	Italian	Noli	1 Michelin star	1 Michelin star	1 Michelin star
Vignamare	Modern	Andora	1 Michelin star	1 Michelin star	—
Reference(s)					

== Lombardy ==
As of the 2027 Michelin Guide, there are 59 restaurants in Lombardy with a Michelin star rating, which includes the city of Milan.

Key
1 Michelin star	One Michelin star
2 Michelin stars	Two Michelin stars
3 Michelin stars	Three Michelin stars
—	The restaurant did not receive a star that year
Closed	The restaurant is no longer open

Michelin-starred restaurants
Name	Cuisine	Location	2025	2026	2027
Aalto	Japanese	Milan – Municipio 9	1 Michelin star	Closed	
Abba	Creative	Milan – Municipio 8	—	1 Michelin star	1 Michelin star
Acqua	Seafood	Olgiate Olona	1 Michelin star	1 Michelin star	1 Michelin star
Acquerello	Creative	Fagnano Olona	1 Michelin star	1 Michelin star	1 Michelin star
Al Gambero	Italian	Calvisano	1 Michelin star	1 Michelin star	1 Michelin star
Andrea Aprea	Italian	Milan – Municipio 1	2 Michelin stars	2 Michelin stars	2 Michelin stars
Anima	Contemporary	Milan – Municipio 9	1 Michelin star	1 Michelin star	1 Michelin star
Assonica	Italian	Sorisole	1 Michelin star	1 Michelin star	1 Michelin star
Autem	Italian	Milan – Municipio 4	—	—	1 Michelin star
Berton	Italian	Milan – Municipio 9	1 Michelin star	1 Michelin star	1 Michelin star
Bianca sul Lago	Mediterranean	Oggiono	1 Michelin star	—	—
Bolle	Italian	Lallio	1 Michelin star	—	—
Capriccio	Modern	Manerba del Garda	1 Michelin star	1 Michelin star	1 Michelin star
Casa Leali	Italian	Puegnago sul Garda	1 Michelin star	1 Michelin star	1 Michelin star
Casa Romano	Mediterranean	Alzano Lombardo	—	—	1 Michelin star
Contrada Bricconi	Italian	Oltressenda Alta	1 Michelin star	1 Michelin star	1 Michelin star
Contraste	Modern	Milan – Municipio 5	1 Michelin star	1 Michelin star	1 Michelin star
Cracco in Galleria	Modern	Milan – Municipio 1	1 Michelin star	1 Michelin star	1 Michelin star
Cucina Cereda	Modern	Ponte San Pietro	1 Michelin star	1 Michelin star	1 Michelin star
D'O	Italian	Cornaredo	2 Michelin stars	2 Michelin stars	2 Michelin stars
Da Vittorio	Italian	Brusaporto	3 Michelin stars	3 Michelin stars	3 Michelin stars
Dal Pescatore	Italian	Runate	3 Michelin stars	3 Michelin stars	3 Michelin stars
Due Colombe	Italian	Borgonato	1 Michelin star	1 Michelin star	1 Michelin star
Enrico Bartolini al Mudec	Creative	Milan – Municipio 6	3 Michelin stars	3 Michelin stars	3 Michelin stars
Esplanade	Italian	Desenzano del Garda	1 Michelin star	1 Michelin star	—
Felix Lo Basso	Italian	Milan – Municipio 3	1 Michelin star	Closed	
Grow	Creative	Albiate	1 Michelin star	1 Michelin star	1 Michelin star
Horto	Modern	Milan – Municipio 1	1 Michelin star	1 Michelin star	1 Michelin star
I Castagni	Italian	Vigevano	1 Michelin star	1 Michelin star	—
Il Cantinone	Contemporary	Madesimo	1 Michelin star	1 Michelin star	1 Michelin star
Il Circolino	Creative	Monza	1 Michelin star	1 Michelin star	Closed
Il Cantuccio	Modern	Albavilla	1 Michelin star	1 Michelin star	1 Michelin star
Il Fagiano	Italian	Fasano del Garda	1 Michelin star	1 Michelin star	—
Il Luogo Aimo e Nadia	Italian	Milan – Municipio 6	1 Michelin star	1 Michelin star	1 Michelin star
Il Saraceno	Mediterranean	Cavernago	1 Michelin star	1 Michelin star	1 Michelin star
Il Sereno Al Lago	Modern	Torno	1 Michelin star	1 Michelin star	1 Michelin star
Impronte	Mediterranean	Bergamo	1 Michelin star	1 Michelin star	—
Iyo	Japanese	Milan – Municipio 8	1 Michelin star	1 Michelin star	1 Michelin star
Iyo Kaiseki	Japanese	Milan – Municipio 9	—	1 Michelin star	1 Michelin star
Joia	Vegetarian	Milan – Municipio 3	1 Michelin star	1 Michelin star	1 Michelin star
Kitchen	Italian	Como	1 Michelin star	1 Michelin star	1 Michelin star
La Coldana	Contemporary	Lodi	1 Michelin star	1 Michelin star	—
La Preséf	Alpine	Mantello	1 Michelin star	1 Michelin star	1 Michelin star
La Rucola 2.0	Creative	Ponte San Pietro	1 Michelin star	1 Michelin star	1 Michelin star
La Speranzina	Creative	Sirmione	1 Michelin star	1 Michelin star	1 Michelin star
La Tavola	Creative	Laveno	1 Michelin star	—	—
La Tortuga	Italian	Gargnano	1 Michelin star	1 Michelin star	1 Michelin star
Lanterna Verde	Italian	Villa di Chiavenna	1 Michelin star	1 Michelin star	1 Michelin star
Leon d'Oro	Italian	Pralboino	1 Michelin star	1 Michelin star	1 Michelin star
Lido 84	Creative	Fasano del Garda	1 Michelin star	1 Michelin star	Closed
Lino	Creative	Oggiono	1 Michelin star	—	Closed
LoRo	Creative	Trescore Balneario	1 Michelin star	1 Michelin star	1 Michelin star
Materia	Creative	Cernobbio	1 Michelin star	1 Michelin star	1 Michelin star
Miramonti l'Altro	French	Concesio	2 Michelin stars	1 Michelin star	1 Michelin star
Moebius Sperimentale	Creative	Milan – Municipio 2	1 Michelin star	1 Michelin star	1 Michelin star
Olio	Italian	Origgio	—	1 Michelin star	1 Michelin star
Olmo	Modern	Cornaredo	1 Michelin star	1 Michelin star	1 Michelin star
Osteria della Brughiera	Italian	Villa d'Almè	1 Michelin star	1 Michelin star	1 Michelin star
Procaccini	Italian	Milan – Municipio 8	—	1 Michelin star	1 Michelin star
Sadler	Italian	Milan – Municipio 1	1 Michelin star	1 Michelin star	1 Michelin star
San Martino	Seafood	Treviglio	1 Michelin star	1 Michelin star	1 Michelin star
Sediscesimo Secolo	Creative	Pudiano	1 Michelin star	1 Michelin star	Closed
Senso Lake Garda	Creative	Limone sul Garda	—	1 Michelin star	1 Michelin star
Seta	International	Milan – Municipio 1	2 Michelin stars	2 Michelin stars	2 Michelin stars
Sine by Di Pinto	Italian	Milan – Municipio 4	1 Michelin star	1 Michelin star	1 Michelin star
sui generis.	Creative	Saronno	1 Michelin star	1 Michelin star	1 Michelin star
Tancredi	Italian	Sirmione	1 Michelin star	1 Michelin star	1 Michelin star
Téa del Kosmo	Alpine	Livigno	—	—	1 Michelin star
Trattoria Contemporanea	Italian	Lomazzo	1 Michelin star	1 Michelin star	1 Michelin star
Umberto de Martino	Mediterranean	San Paolo d’Argon	1 Michelin star	—	—
Verso Capitaneo	Mediterranean	Milan – Municipio 1	2 Michelin stars	2 Michelin stars	2 Michelin stars
Villa Elena	Creative	Bergamo	2 Michelin stars	2 Michelin stars	2 Michelin stars
Villa Feltrinelli	Creative	Gargnano	2 Michelin stars	2 Michelin stars	2 Michelin stars
Villa Naj	Italian	Torrazza Coste	1 Michelin star	1 Michelin star	1 Michelin star
Vitium	Italian	Crema	1 Michelin star	Closed	
Reference(s)					

== Marche ==
As of the 2027 Michelin Guide, there are 9 restaurants in Marche with a Michelin star rating.

Key
1 Michelin star	One Michelin star
2 Michelin stars	Two Michelin stars
3 Michelin stars	Three Michelin stars
—	The restaurant did not receive a star that year

Michelin-starred restaurants
Name	Cuisine	Location	2025	2026	2027
Andreina	Modern	Loreto	1 Michelin star	1 Michelin star	1 Michelin star
Casa Bertini	Italian	Recanati	—	1 Michelin star	1 Michelin star
Casa Rapisarda	Italian	Numana	—	—	1 Michelin star
Dalla Gioconda	Italian	Gabicce Monte	1 Michelin star	1 Michelin star	1 Michelin star
Il Tiglio	Italian	Montemonaco	1 Michelin star	1 Michelin star	1 Michelin star
Madonnina del Pescatore	Creative	Marzocca	2 Michelin stars	2 Michelin stars	2 Michelin stars
Nostrano	Italian	Pesaro	1 Michelin star	1 Michelin star	1 Michelin star
Retroscena	Creative	Porto San Giorgio	1 Michelin star	1 Michelin star	1 Michelin star
Uliassi	Seafood	Senigallia	3 Michelin stars	3 Michelin stars	2 Michelin stars
Reference(s)					

== Molise ==
As of the 2027 Michelin Guide, there is 1 restaurant in Molise with a Michelin star rating.

Key
1 Michelin star	One Michelin star

Michelin-starred restaurants
Name	Cuisine	Location	2025	2026	2027
Locanda Mammì	Italian	Agnone	1 Michelin star	1 Michelin star	1 Michelin star
Reference(s)					

== Piedmont ==
As of the 2027 Michelin Guide, there are 34 restaurants in Piedmont with a Michelin star rating, which includes the city of Turin.

Key
1 Michelin star	One Michelin star
2 Michelin stars	Two Michelin stars
3 Michelin stars	Three Michelin stars
—	The restaurant did not receive a star that year
Closed	The restaurant is no longer open

Michelin-starred restaurants
Name	Cuisine	Location	2025	2026	2027
21.9	Italian	Piobesi d'Alba	1 Michelin star	1 Michelin star	—
Akoya	Japanese	Turin – Centro	—	—	1 Michelin star
Al Sorriso	Italian	Soriso	1 Michelin star	1 Michelin star	1 Michelin star
All'Enoteca	Italian	Canale	1 Michelin star	1 Michelin star	1 Michelin star
Andrea Lorossa	Italian	Turin – Borgo Po	1 Michelin star	1 Michelin star	1 Michelin star
Andrea Monesi - Locanda di Orta	Italian	Orta San Giulio	1 Michelin star	1 Michelin star	1 Michelin star
Antica Corona Reale	Italian	Cervere	2 Michelin stars	2 Michelin stars	2 Michelin stars
Atelier	Italian	Domodossola	1 Michelin star	1 Michelin star	1 Michelin star
Borgo Sant'Anna	Italian	Monforte d'Alba	1 Michelin star	1 Michelin star	1 Michelin star
Ca'Vittoria	Modern	Tigliole	1 Michelin star	1 Michelin star	1 Michelin star
Cannavacciuolo Bistrot	Creative	Turin – Borgo Po	1 Michelin star	1 Michelin star	—
Cannavacciuolo by the Lake	Modern	Pettenasco	1 Michelin star	1 Michelin star	1 Michelin star
Cannavacciuolo Le Cattedrali Asti	Mediterranean	Asti	1 Michelin star	1 Michelin star	1 Michelin star
Carignano	Creative	Turin – Centro	1 Michelin star	1 Michelin star	—
Condividere	Italian	Turin – Aurora	1 Michelin star	1 Michelin star	1 Michelin star
Del Cambio	Italian	Turin – Centro	1 Michelin star	1 Michelin star	1 Michelin star
Dolce Stil Novo alla Reggia	Italian	Venaria Reale	1 Michelin star	1 Michelin star	1 Michelin star
FRE	Creative	Monforte d'Alba	1 Michelin star	1 Michelin star	1 Michelin star
Guidoristorante	Italian	Serralunga d'Alba	1 Michelin star	1 Michelin star	1 Michelin star
Il Centro	Italian	Priocca	1 Michelin star	1 Michelin star	1 Michelin star
Il Patio	Italian	Pollone	1 Michelin star	1 Michelin star	1 Michelin star
Il Ristorante di Guido da Costigliole	Italian	Santo Stefano Belbo	1 Michelin star	1 Michelin star	1 Michelin star
La Ciau del Tornavento	Italian	Treiso	1 Michelin star	1 Michelin star	1 Michelin star
La Credenza	Creative	San Maurizio Canavese	1 Michelin star	1 Michelin star	1 Michelin star
La Limonaia	Contemporary	Turin – Pozzo Strada	—	—	1 Michelin star
La Rei Natura	Creative	Serralunga d'Alba	2 Michelin stars	3 Michelin stars	3 Michelin stars
Locanda del Pilone	Creative	Alba	1 Michelin star	1 Michelin star	1 Michelin star
Locanda Sant'Uffizio	Italian	Cioccaro	2 Michelin stars	2 Michelin stars	2 Michelin stars
Magorabin	Italian	Turin – Vanchiglia	1 Michelin star	Closed	
Massimo Camia	Italian	Novello	1 Michelin star	1 Michelin star	1 Michelin star
Nazionale	Italian	Vernante	1 Michelin star	1 Michelin star	1 Michelin star
Piano35	Italian	Turin – Cit Turin	1 Michelin star	1 Michelin star	1 Michelin star
Piazza Duomo	Creative	Alba	3 Michelin stars	3 Michelin stars	3 Michelin stars
Strattoria	Italian	Montrigiasco	—	—	1 Michelin star
Trattoria Zappatori	Modern	Pinerolo	1 Michelin star	1 Michelin star	1 Michelin star
Unforgettable	Italian	Turin – Centro	1 Michelin star	1 Michelin star	—
Villa Crespi	Mediterranean	Orta San Giulio	3 Michelin stars	3 Michelin stars	3 Michelin stars
Vintage 1997	Italian	Turin – Centro	1 Michelin star	1 Michelin star	1 Michelin star
Visione	Italian	Barbaresco	—	—	1 Michelin star
Reference(s)					

== Sardinia ==
As of the 2027 Michelin Guide, there are 7 restaurants in Sardinia with a Michelin star rating.

Key
1 Michelin star	One Michelin star
—	The restaurant did not receive a star that year

Michelin-starred restaurants
Name	Cuisine	Location	2025	2026	2027
Amanõ	Sardinian	Cagliari	—	—	1 Michelin star
Capogiro	Sardinian	Baia Sardinia	—	1 Michelin star	1 Michelin star
Fradis Minoris	Sardinian	Pula	1 Michelin star	1 Michelin star	1 Michelin star
Gusto by Sadler	Italian	San Teodoro	1 Michelin star	1 Michelin star	—
Il Fuoco Sacro	Italian	San Teodoro	1 Michelin star	1 Michelin star	1 Michelin star
Italo Bassi Confusion (Note: Restaurant was named Confusion Restaurant until 2026)	Creative	Porto Cervo	1 Michelin star	1 Michelin star	1 Michelin star
La Spigola	Seafood	Golfo Aranci	—	—	1 Michelin star
Ulìa	Modern	Arzachena	—	—	1 Michelin star
Reference(s)					

== Sicily ==
As of the 2027 Michelin Guide, there are 22 restaurants in Sicily with a Michelin star rating.

Key
1 Michelin star	One Michelin star
2 Michelin stars	Two Michelin stars
—	The restaurant did not receive a star that year

Michelin-starred restaurants
Name	Cuisine	Location	2025	2026	2027
Accursio	Sicilian	Modica	1 Michelin star	—	—
Charleston	Modern	Palermo	—	—	1 Michelin star
Coria	Italian	Catania	1 Michelin star	1 Michelin star	1 Michelin star
Cortile Spirito Santo	Creative	Syracuse	1 Michelin star	1 Michelin star	1 Michelin star
Crocifisso	Contemporary	Noto	1 Michelin star	1 Michelin star	1 Michelin star
Duomo	Creative	Ragusa Ibla	2 Michelin stars	2 Michelin stars	2 Michelin stars
Il Bavaglino	Creative	Terrasini	1 Michelin star	1 Michelin star	1 Michelin star
Il Cappero	Mediterranean	Vulcano	1 Michelin star	1 Michelin star	—
I Pupi	Sicilian	Bagheria	1 Michelin star	1 Michelin star	1 Michelin star
I Tenerumi	Vegetarian	Vulcano	1 Michelin star	2 Michelin stars	2 Michelin stars
La Capinera	Sicilian	Taormina	1 Michelin star	1 Michelin star	1 Michelin star
La Madia	Sicilian	Licata	2 Michelin stars	2 Michelin stars	2 Michelin stars
Locanda Don Serafino	Creative	Ragusa Ibla	1 Michelin star	1 Michelin star	1 Michelin star
Līmū	Creative	Bagheria	1 Michelin star	1 Michelin star	1 Michelin star
Mec Restaurant	Sicilian	Palermo	1 Michelin star	1 Michelin star	1 Michelin star
Otto Geleng	Mediterranean	Taormina	1 Michelin star	1 Michelin star	1 Michelin star
Principe Cerami	Modern	Taormina	1 Michelin star	1 Michelin star	1 Michelin star
Sapio	Sicilian	Catania	1 Michelin star	1 Michelin star	1 Michelin star
Shalai	Sicilian	Linguaglossa	1 Michelin star	1 Michelin star	1 Michelin star
Signum	Sicilian	Salina	1 Michelin star	1 Michelin star	1 Michelin star
St. George by Heinz Beck	Creative	Taormina	2 Michelin stars	2 Michelin stars	2 Michelin stars
Vineria Modì	Italian	Taormina	1 Michelin star	1 Michelin star	1 Michelin star
VotaVota	Seafood	Marina di Ragusa	1 Michelin star	1 Michelin star	1 Michelin star
Zash	Creative	Archi	1 Michelin star	1 Michelin star	1 Michelin star
Reference(s)					

== Trentino-Alto Adige/Südtirol ==
As of the 2027 Michelin Guide, there are 29 restaurants in Trentino-Alto Adige/Südtirol with a Michelin star rating.

Key
1 Michelin star	One Michelin star
2 Michelin stars	Two Michelin stars
3 Michelin stars	Three Michelin stars
—	The restaurant did not receive a star that year
Closed	The restaurant is no longer open

Michelin-starred restaurants
Name	Cuisine	Location	2025	2026	2027
Alpenroyal Gourmet Restaurant	Creative	Sëlva	1 Michelin star	1 Michelin star	1 Michelin star
Anna Stuben	Creative	Ortisei	1 Michelin star	1 Michelin star	1 Michelin star
Apostelstube	Creative	Brixen	1 Michelin star	1 Michelin star	1 Michelin star
Atelier Moessmer Norbert Niederkofler	Alpine	Brunico	3 Michelin stars	3 Michelin stars	3 Michelin stars
Castel	Alpine	Tirol	2 Michelin stars	2 Michelin stars	2 Michelin stars
Dolomieu	Contemporary	Madonna di Campiglio	—	1 Michelin star	1 Michelin star
El Molin	Alpine	Cavalese	—	1 Michelin star	1 Michelin star
Gourmetstube Einhorn	International	Mules	1 Michelin star	1 Michelin star	1 Michelin star
Grual	Italian	Pinzolo	—	1 Michelin star	1 Michelin star
Il Gallo Cedrone	Creative	Madonna di Campiglio	—	1 Michelin star	1 Michelin star
In Viaggio	Creative	Merano	1 Michelin star	1 Michelin star	1 Michelin star
Johannesstube	Alpine	Nova Levante	1 Michelin star	1 Michelin star	1 Michelin star
Kuppelrain	Modern	Castelbello	1 Michelin star	1 Michelin star	1 Michelin star
La Stüa de Michil	Creative	Corvara in Badia	1 Michelin star	1 Michelin star	1 Michelin star
Locanda Margon	Creative	Ravina	—	1 Michelin star	1 Michelin star
Luisl Stube	Creative	Algund	1 Michelin star	1 Michelin star	1 Michelin star
Malga Panna	Italian	Moena	—	1 Michelin star	1 Michelin star
Mamesa	Fusion	Burgusio	—	—	1 Michelin star
Osteria Acquarol	Alpine	San Michele	1 Michelin star	1 Michelin star	1 Michelin star
Peter Brunel	Modern	Arco	—	1 Michelin star	Closed
Porcino	Mediterranean	Badia	—	1 Michelin star	1 Michelin star
Prezioso	Alpine	Merano	1 Michelin star	1 Michelin star	1 Michelin star
Quellenhof Gourmetstube 1897	Creative	Saint Martin in Passeier	—	1 Michelin star	1 Michelin star
Schöneck	Italian	Molini	1 Michelin star	1 Michelin star	1 Michelin star
Sissi	Italian	Merano	1 Michelin star	1 Michelin star	1 Michelin star
Stube Hermitage	Italian	Madonna di Campiglio	—	1 Michelin star	1 Michelin star
Suinsom	Italian	Sëlva	1 Michelin star	1 Michelin star	1 Michelin star
Terra The Magic Place	Italian	Sarentino	2 Michelin stars	2 Michelin stars	2 Michelin stars
Tilia	Modern	Tolblach	1 Michelin star	1 Michelin star	1 Michelin star
Zum Löwen	Italian	Tisens	1 Michelin star	—	—
Zur Rose	Italian	San Michele	1 Michelin star	1 Michelin star	1 Michelin star
Reference(s)					

== Tuscany ==
As of the 2027 Michelin Guide, there are 39 restaurants in Tuscany with a Michelin star rating, which includes the city of Florence.

Key
1 Michelin star	One Michelin star
2 Michelin stars	Two Michelin stars
3 Michelin stars	Three Michelin stars
—	The restaurant did not receive a star that year
Closed	The restaurant is no longer open

Michelin-starred restaurants
Name	Cuisine	Location	2025	2026	2027
Arnolfo	Italian	Colle di Val d'Elsa	2 Michelin stars	2 Michelin stars	2 Michelin stars
Atman	Creative	Vinci	1 Michelin star	1 Michelin star	—
Atto di Vito Mollica	Italian	Florence	1 Michelin star	1 Michelin star	1 Michelin star
Baldo Vino	Creative	Pistoia	—	—	1 Michelin star
Bistrot	Italian	Forte dei Marmi	1 Michelin star	1 Michelin star	1 Michelin star
Borgo San Jacopo	Italian	Florence	1 Michelin star	1 Michelin star	1 Michelin star
Bracali	Italian	Ghirlanda	1 Michelin star	1 Michelin star	1 Michelin star
Butterfly	Italian	Marlia	1 Michelin star	1 Michelin star	1 Michelin star
Caino	Italian	Montemerano	2 Michelin stars	2 Michelin stars	2 Michelin stars
Campo del Drago	Italian	Montalcino	2 Michelin stars	2 Michelin stars	2 Michelin stars
Cannavacciuolo Vineyard	Italian	Casanova di Terricciola	1 Michelin star	1 Michelin star	1 Michelin star
Castello di Fighine	Contemporary	San Casciano dei Bagni	1 Michelin star	1 Michelin star	Closed
Contrada	Italian	Castelnuovo Berardenga	1 Michelin star	1 Michelin star	1 Michelin star
Enoteca Pinchiorri	Italian	Florence	3 Michelin stars	3 Michelin stars	3 Michelin stars
Gabbiano 3.0	Creative	Marina di Grosseto	1 Michelin star	1 Michelin star	Closed
Gucci Osteria da Massimo Bottura	Italian	Florence	1 Michelin star	1 Michelin star	1 Michelin star
Il Falconiere	Italian	San Martino	1 Michelin star	1 Michelin star	1 Michelin star
Il Palagio	Italian	Florence	1 Michelin star	1 Michelin star	1 Michelin star
Il Pellicano	Italian	Porto Ercole	1 Michelin star	1 Michelin star	1 Michelin star
Il Pievano	Italian	Gaiole in Chianti	1 Michelin star	1 Michelin star	1 Michelin star
Il Piccolo Principe	Creative	Viareggio	2 Michelin stars	2 Michelin stars	2 Michelin stars
Il Visibilio	Creative	Castelnuovo Berardenga	1 Michelin star	1 Michelin star	1 Michelin star
L'Asinello	Italian	Castelnuovo Berardenga	1 Michelin star	1 Michelin star	1 Michelin star
La Magnolia	Modern	Forte dei Marmi	1 Michelin star	1 Michelin star	1 Michelin star
La Pineta	Seafood	Marina di Bibbona	1 Michelin star	1 Michelin star	—
La Sala dei Grappoli	Modern	Montalcino	1 Michelin star	1 Michelin star	1 Michelin star
La Trattoria Enrico Bartolini	Mediterranean	Castiglione della Pescaia	1 Michelin star	1 Michelin star	—
La Torre	Creative	Tavarnelle Val di Pesa	1 Michelin star	1 Michelin star	1 Michelin star
Linfa	Creative	San Gimignano	1 Michelin star	1 Michelin star	1 Michelin star
Locanda de Banchieri	Italian	Fosdinovo	1 Michelin star	1 Michelin star	1 Michelin star
Lorenzo	Seafood	Forte dei Marmi	1 Michelin star	1 Michelin star	—
Luca's	Contemporary	Florence	—	1 Michelin star	1 Michelin star
Lunasia	Modern	Viareggio	1 Michelin star	1 Michelin star	1 Michelin star
Lux Lucis	Italian	Forte dei Marmi	1 Michelin star	1 Michelin star	1 Michelin star
Octavin	Creative	Arezzo	1 Michelin star	1 Michelin star	Closed
Osmosi	Creative	Montepulciano	1 Michelin star	1 Michelin star	1 Michelin star
Osteria di Passignano	Italian	Passignano	1 Michelin star	1 Michelin star	1 Michelin star
Paca	Italian	Prato	1 Michelin star	1 Michelin star	1 Michelin star
Poggio Rosso	Creative	Castelnuovo Berardenga	1 Michelin star	1 Michelin star	1 Michelin star
Romano	Seafood	Viareggio	1 Michelin star	1 Michelin star	1 Michelin star
Santa Elisabetta	Mediterranean	Florence	2 Michelin stars	2 Michelin stars	Closed
Saporium	Italian	Chiusdino	1 Michelin star	1 Michelin star	1 Michelin star
Saporium Firenze	Creative	Florence	1 Michelin star	1 Michelin star	1 Michelin star
Sciabola	Mediterranean	Forte dei Marmi	—	1 Michelin star	1 Michelin star
Serrae Villa Fiesole	Italian	Fiesole	1 Michelin star	1 Michelin star	1 Michelin star
Silene	Italian	Seggiano	1 Michelin star	1 Michelin star	1 Michelin star
Terramira	Italian	Capolona	1 Michelin star	Closed	
Tosca	Italian	Casole d'Elsa	—	—	1 Michelin star
Reference(s)					

== Umbria ==
As of the 2027 Michelin Guide, there are 4 restaurants in Umbria with a Michelin star rating.

Key
1 Michelin star	One Michelin star
—	The restaurant did not receive a star that year
Closed	The restaurant is no longer open

Michelin-starred restaurants
Name	Cuisine	Location	2025	2026	2027
Ada	Modern	Perugia	1 Michelin star	1 Michelin star	1 Michelin star
Casa Vissani	Italian	Baschi	1 Michelin star	—	—
Elementi	Italian	Torgiano	1 Michelin star	1 Michelin star	1 Michelin star
L'Acciuga	Italian	Perugia	1 Michelin star	—	Closed
Une	Italian	Capodacqua	1 Michelin star	1 Michelin star	1 Michelin star
Vespasia	Italian	Norcia	1 Michelin star	1 Michelin star	1 Michelin star
Reference(s)					

== Veneto ==
As of the 2027 Michelin Guide, there are 32 restaurants in Veneto with a Michelin star rating, which includes the city of Venice.

Key
1 Michelin star	One Michelin star
2 Michelin stars	Two Michelin stars
3 Michelin stars	Three Michelin stars
—	The restaurant did not receive a star that year
Closed	The restaurant is no longer open

Michelin-starred restaurants
Name	Cuisine	Location	2025	2026	2027
1224 Restaurant Cortina	Creative	Cortina d'Ampezzo	—	—	1 Michelin star
Agli Amici Dopolavoro	Creative	Venice – Sacca Sessola	—	1 Michelin star	—
Amista	Italian	Corrubbio	1 Michelin star	1 Michelin star	—
Antica Osteria Cera	Seafood	Lughetto	2 Michelin stars	2 Michelin stars	2 Michelin stars
Aqua Crua	Creative	Barbarano Vicentino	1 Michelin star	1 Michelin star	1 Michelin star
Casa Perbellini 12 Apostoli	Creative	Verona	3 Michelin stars	3 Michelin stars	3 Michelin stars
Casin del Gamba	Italian	Altissimo	1 Michelin star	1 Michelin star	1 Michelin star
Damini Macelleria & Affini	Creative	Arzignano	1 Michelin star	1 Michelin star	1 Michelin star
Dolada	Italian	Plois	1 Michelin star	1 Michelin star	1 Michelin star
Famiglia Rana	Italian	Oppeano	1 Michelin star	2 Michelin stars	2 Michelin stars
Gellivs	Modern	Oderzo	1 Michelin star	1 Michelin star	1 Michelin star
Glam Enrico Bartolini	Creative	Venice – Santa Croce	2 Michelin stars	2 Michelin stars	2 Michelin stars
Il Desco	Italian	Verona	1 Michelin star	1 Michelin star	1 Michelin star
Iris	Italian	Verona	1 Michelin star	1 Michelin star	1 Michelin star
La Favellina	Italian	Malo	1 Michelin star	1 Michelin star	1 Michelin star
La Peca	Modern	Lonigo	2 Michelin stars	2 Michelin stars	2 Michelin stars
La Tana Gourmet	Creative	Asiago	1 Michelin star	1 Michelin star	1 Michelin star
Lazzaro 1915	Creative	Pontelongo	1 Michelin star	1 Michelin star	1 Michelin star
Le Calandre	Creative	Rubano	3 Michelin stars	3 Michelin stars	3 Michelin stars
Local	Contemporary	Venice – Castello	1 Michelin star	1 Michelin star	1 Michelin star
Locanda Baggio	Modern	Asolo	—	—	1 Michelin star
Locanda San Lorenzo	Modern	Puos d'Alpago	1 Michelin star	1 Michelin star	1 Michelin star
Matteo Grandi in Basilica	Contemporary	Vicenza	1 Michelin star	1 Michelin star	Closed
Nin	Creative	Brenzone sul Garda	1 Michelin star	1 Michelin star	1 Michelin star
Oro	Italian	Venice – Giudecca	1 Michelin star	1 Michelin star	1 Michelin star
Oseleta	Creative	Cavaion Veronese	1 Michelin star	1 Michelin star	1 Michelin star
Palais Royal	Mediterranean	Venice – San Marco	1 Michelin star	1 Michelin star	Closed
Quadri	Modern	Venice – San Marco	1 Michelin star	1 Michelin star	1 Michelin star
San Martino	Modern	Scorzè	1 Michelin star	1 Michelin star	1 Michelin star
SanBrite	Alpine	Cortina d'Ampezzo	1 Michelin star	1 Michelin star	1 Michelin star
Spinechile	Creative	Schio	1 Michelin star	1 Michelin star	1 Michelin star
Storie d'Amore	Modern	Borgoricco	1 Michelin star	1 Michelin star	1 Michelin star
Tivoli	Italian	Cortina d'Ampezzo	1 Michelin star	1 Michelin star	1 Michelin star
Vecchia Malcesine	Italian	Malcesine	1 Michelin star	1 Michelin star	1 Michelin star
Venissa	Italian	Mazzorbo	1 Michelin star	1 Michelin star	1 Michelin star
Vite	Modern	Lancenigo	1 Michelin star	Closed	
Wistèria	Modern	Venice – San Polo	1 Michelin star	1 Michelin star	1 Michelin star
Reference(s)					
