= Speck =

European cured pork product

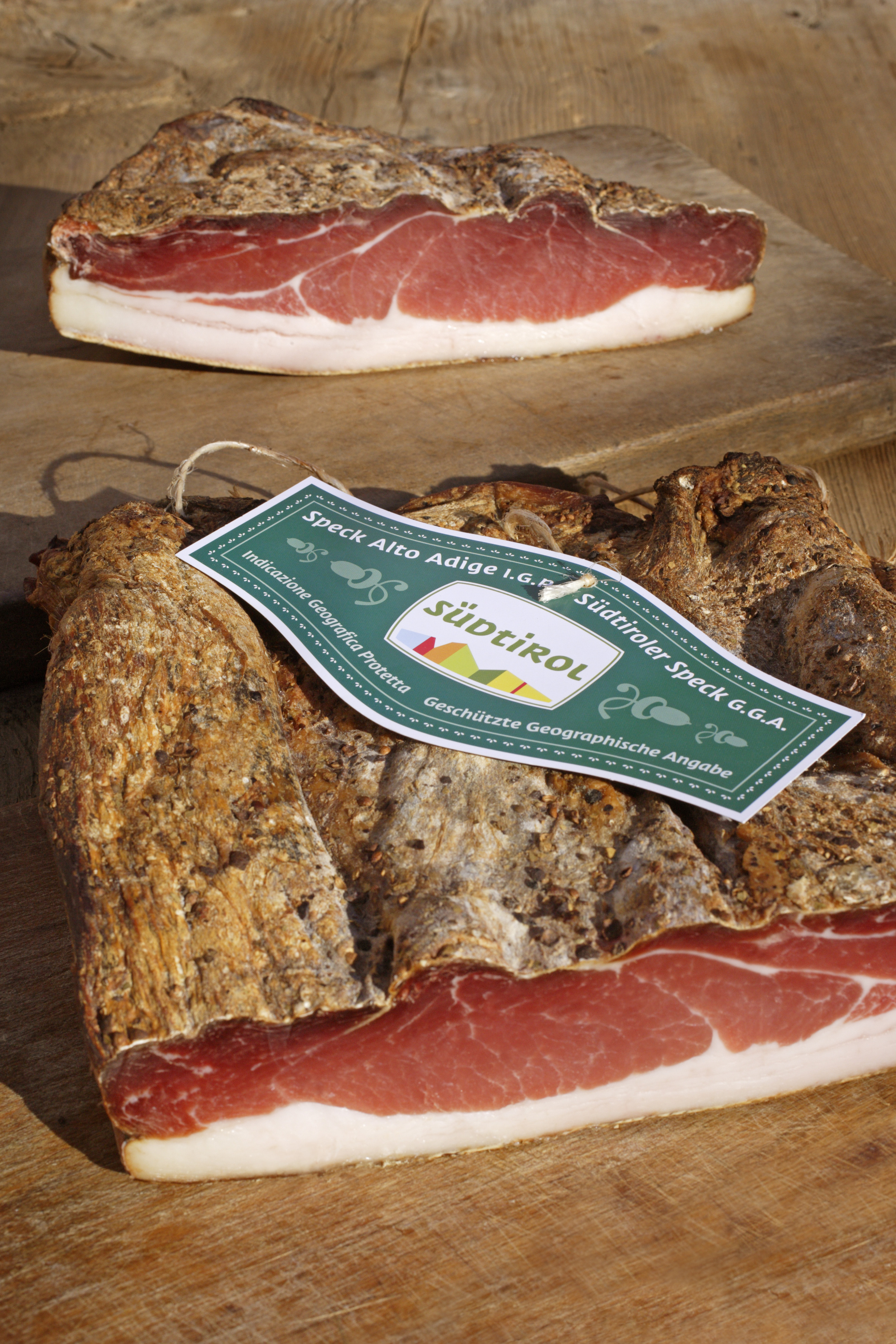
Speck Alto Adige PGI – South Tyrolean speck

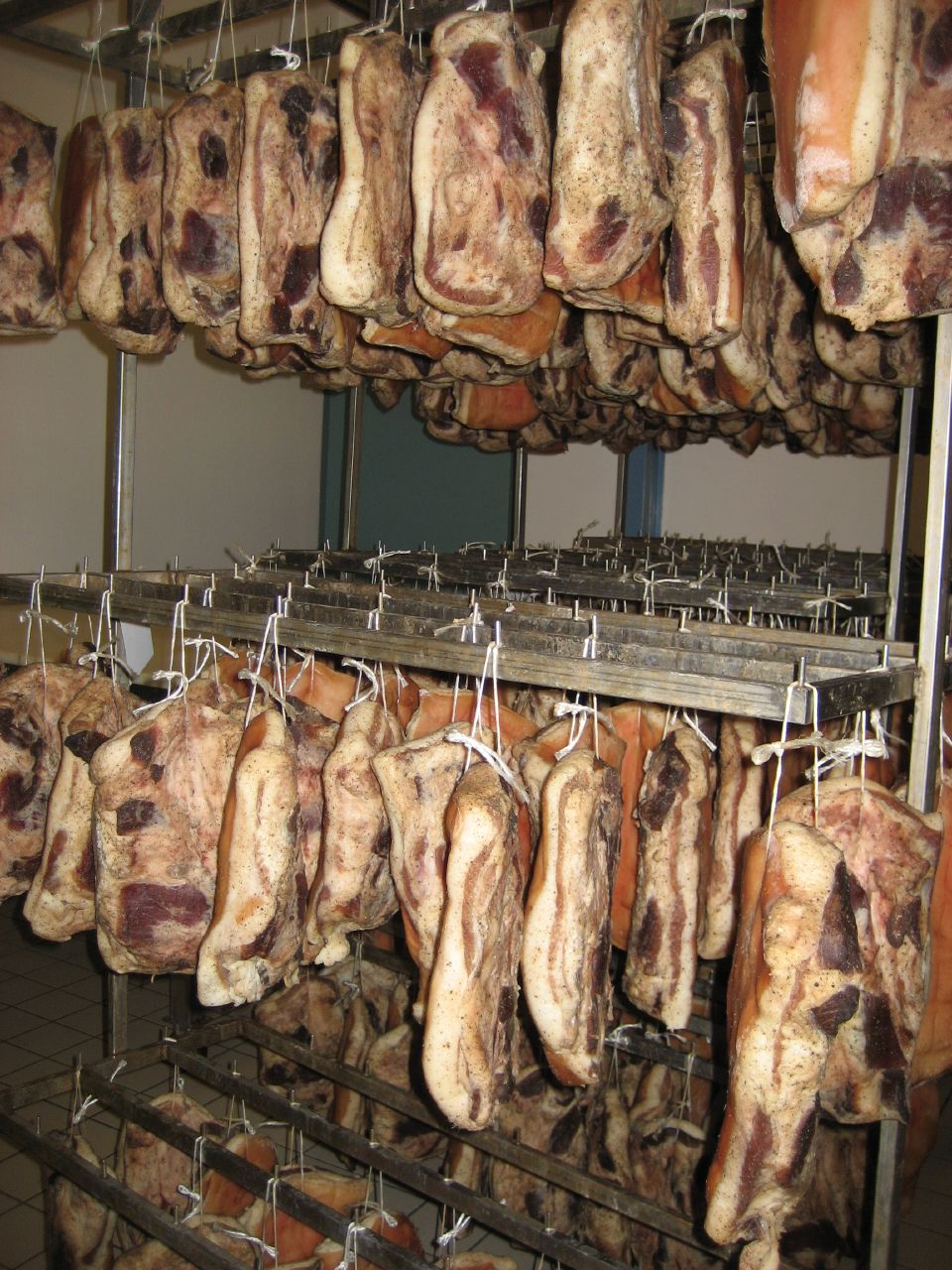
Smoked speck

Speck can refer to a number of European cured pork products, typically salted and air-cured and often lightly smoked but not cooked. In Germany, speck is pickled pork fat with or without some meat in it. In the Netherlands and Flanders, in Dutch, spek is bacon. Throughout much of the rest of Europe and parts of the English-speaking culinary world, speck is usually South Tyrolean speck, a type of Italian smoked ham. The term speck became part of popular parlance only in the eighteenth century and replaced the older term bachen, a cognate of bacon.

== Regional varieties ==
There are a number of regional varieties of speck, including:

- Bacon, e.g. Frühstücksspeck ("breakfast speck") in Germany
- Gailtaler speck from Austria, with PGI status, which has been made since the 15th century in the Gail Valley ("Gailtal") in Carinthia
- Schinkenspeck, German "ham bacon", typically made from a flat cut of ham with fat along one side resembling bacon, and traditionally soaked for several days in brine with juniper berries and peppercorn
- Speck Sauris PGI, from Sauris, Friuli, Italy
- Speck Alto Adige PGI, from South Tyrol, Italy
- Tyrolean speck from Austria's Tyrol region, which has PGI status, and has been made since at least the 15th century

== Jewish deli speck ==
In Ashkenazi Jewish cuisine, in which bacon (like all pork) is forbidden as unkosher, "speck" commonly refers to the subcutaneous fat on a brisket of beef. It is a particular speciality of delis serving Montreal-style smoked meat, where slices of the fatty cut are served in sandwiches on rye bread with mustard, sometimes in combination with other, leaner cuts.

== See also ==
- List of dried foods
- List of smoked foods
