= 't Lam, Woudsend =

Smock mill in Woudsend, Friesland, Netherlands

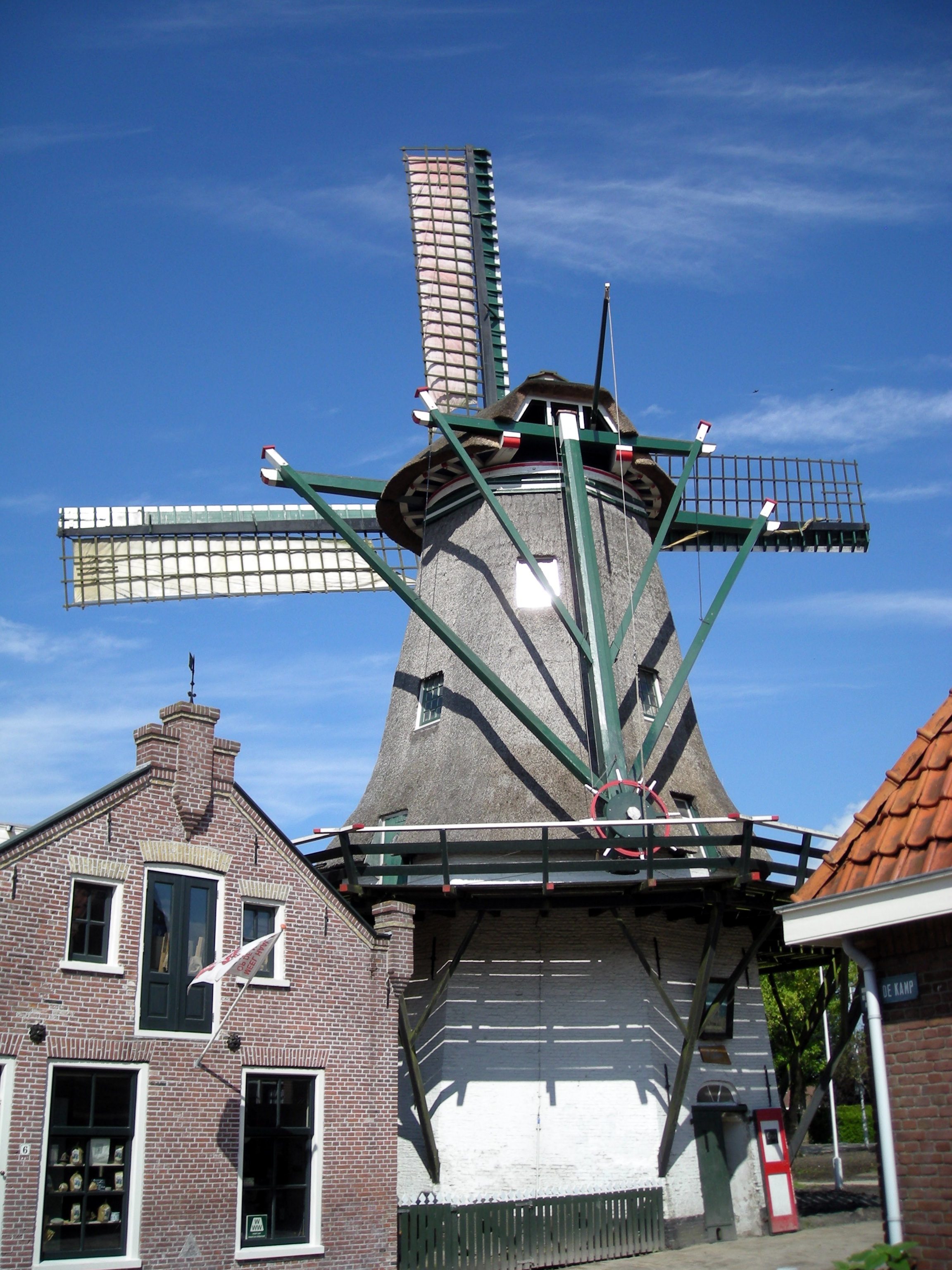
- 't Lam, July 2007

Origin
- Mill name: 't Lam
- Mill location: Molestrjitte 4, 8551 NZ, Woudsend
- Coordinates: 52°56′36″N 5°37′37″E
- Operator(s): Gemeente Sûdwest Fryslân
- Year built: Late 17th century

Information
- Purpose: Corn mill and pearl barley mill
- Type: Smock mill
- Storeys: Two storey smock
- Base storeys: Three storey base
- Smock sides: Eight sides
- No. of sails: Four sails
- Type of sails: Common sails
- Windshaft: Cast iron
- Winding: Tailpole and winch
- No. of pairs of millstones: Three pairs
- Size of millstones: 1.50 metres (4 ft 11 in) diameter

't Lam (English: The Lamb) is a smock mill in Woudsend, Friesland, Netherlands which was built in the late 17th century and is in working order. The mill is listed as a Rijksmonument.

== History ==
't Lam was built before 1698. It was bought in that year by Dirck Tjebbes and was described as a bone mill. An advertisement in the Leeuwarder Courant of 12 July 1775 asked for tenders to repair the corn mill at Woudsend. In January 1837, the mill was bought by M A Tromp. He modernised the mill, and it was offered for sale under the name 't Lam in 1839 for ƒ4,200.25. The mill was then a corn, malt, mustard, pearl barley, and rye mill. The mill was again advertised for sale in 1840 for ƒ2,600. After being offered for sale in 1848 for ƒ2,525, the mill was bought from Wietse Hettema in 1849 by Carl Johan Albert Siegert for ƒ4,500. The mill passed to his son Carl J W Siegert and was advertised for sale for ƒ2,526 following his death in 1870. It was not sold, and was run by Carl Ernest Hugo Siegert until his death in 1915, passing to his son Foeke Siegert. A pair of sails broke in that year. New sails were fitted, as was a replacement windshaft. The windshaft had previously been used in Windlust, Sneek, Friesland, which had burnt down in 1914. The work was carried out by millwright Jan Piers Oly of Sneek.

In 1935, ownership of 't Lam was transferred to Carl Ernest Hugo Siegert. The mill worked through World War II, but the stage was in a poor condition. It was restored in 1948. The mill remained in the Siegert family until 1959, when it was sold to Bauke Lyklema. He sold it to the Gemeente Wymbritseradiel in 1960 for ƒ4,500. Further restorations were carried out in 1970-71, 1981 and 1992-93. The latter was carried out by millwright Hiemstra of Tzummarum, Friesland at a cost of ƒ288,300. In 1999, the gemeente bought the adjoining miller's house for ƒ235,000. It was converted into an information centre and shop. Internal works were carried out in 2012, including the installation of a new pair of millstones. The mill is now owned by the Gemeente Sûdwest Fryslân. It is listed as a Rijksmonument, No. 39846.

== Description ==
't Lam is what the Dutch describe as a "Stellingmolen". It is a smock mill on a brick base. The stage is 5.10 metres (16 ft 9 in) above ground level. The smock and cap are thatched. The mill is winded by tailpole and winch. The sails are Common sails. They have a span of 20.00 metres (65 ft 7 in). The sails are carried on a cast-iron windshaft, which was cast by NSBM, Feyenoord, South Holland in 1852. The windshaft also carries the brake wheel which has 53 teeth. This drives the wallower (26 teeth) at the top of the upright shaft. At the bottom of the upright shaft is the great spur wheel, which has 91 cogs. The great spur wheel drives three pairs of 1.50 metres (4 ft 11 in) diameter millstones via lantern pinion stone nuts which have 26, 28 and 30 staves respectively. Two of the three pairs of millstones are Cullen stones.

== Millers ==
- DircK Tjebbes (1698- )
- M A Tromp (1837- )
- Wietse Hettema ( -1848)
- Carl Johan Albert Siegert (1848- )
- Carl J W Siegert ( -1870)
- Carl Ernest Hugo Siegert (1870-1915)
- Foeke Siegert (1915–35)
- Carl Ernest Hugo Siegert (1835–59)

References for above:-

== Public access ==
't Lam is open to the public on Saturday between 10:00 and 17:00, or by appointment.
