= De Jager, Woudsend =

Windmill in Woudsend, Netherlands

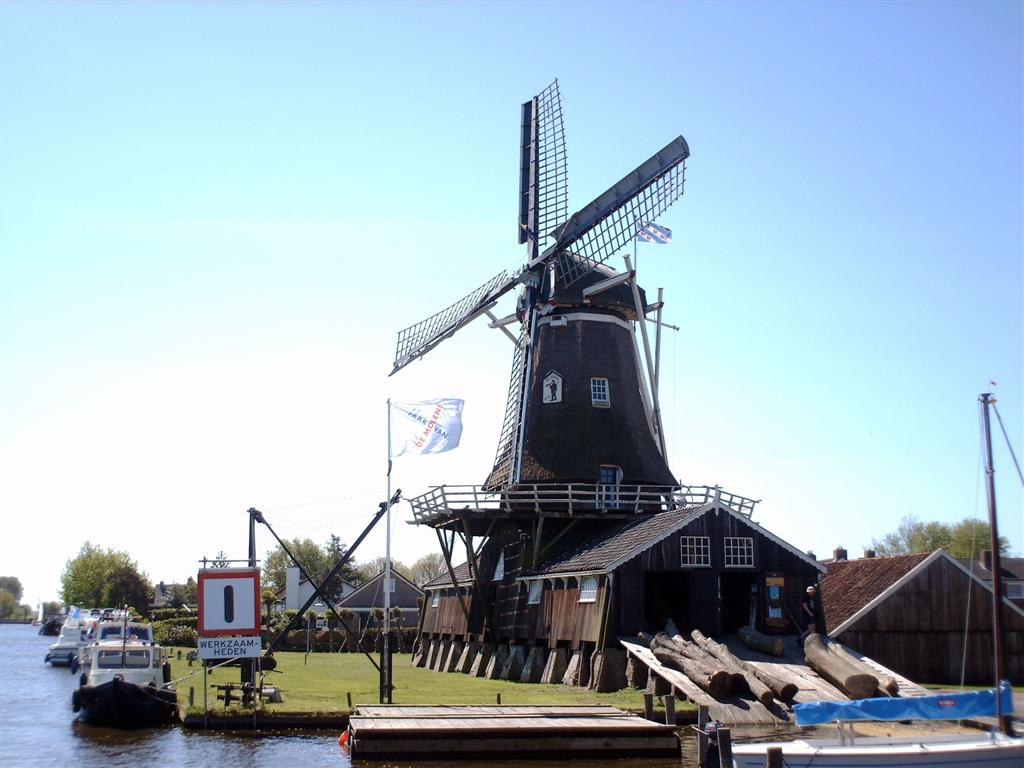
- De Jager, April 2007

Origin
- Mill name: De Jager
- Mill location: Alde Wyk 18, 8551 PR, Woudsend
- Coordinates: 52°56′30″N 5°37′46″E
- Operator(s): Stichting Houtzaagmolen De Jager
- Year built: 1719

Information
- Purpose: saw mill
- Type: Smock mill
- Storeys: Two storey smock
- Base storeys: Three storey base
- Smock sides: Eight sides
- No. of sails: Four sails
- Type of sails: Common sails, fitted with the Fok system on leading edges.
- Windshaft: Cast iron
- Winding: Tailpole and winch
- Type of saw: Vertical frame saws

De Jager (English: The Hunter) is a smock mill in Woudsend, Friesland, Netherlands which was built in 1719 and is in working order. The mill is listed as a Rijksmonument.

== History ==
De Jager was built in 1719 for Age Machiels Tromp and Jeanette Wilhelmina van Broekhuizen. By 1925, the mill was in the ownership of Siebolt Nauta en Zonen, who were declared bankrupt in 1934. They were followed by J Westerhof. In 1935, the loss of a sail brought an end to working by wind power. It worked by electric motor until 1970, but the cap and sails were removed c.1950. The mill was restored in 1975-76. A new cap, windshaft, sails and stage were required. The windshaft came from a drainage mill at Kantens, Groningen that had been demolished in January 1961. In 1965, the mill was sold to the Stichting Zon en Vrijheid. Further restorations were carried out in 1994, and also in 2008-10. The mill is now owned by the Stichting Houtzaagmolen De Jager. It is listed as a Rijksmonument, № 39828.

== Description ==
De Jager is what the Dutch describe as a "Stellingmolen". It is a smock mill on a brick base. The stage is 6.25 metres (20 ft 6 in) above ground level. The smock and cap are thatched. The mill is winded by tailpole and winch. The sails are Common sails, fitted with the Fok system on their leading edges. They have a span of 19.04 metres (62 ft 6 in). The sails are carried on a cast-iron windshaft. The windshaft also carries the brake wheel which has 54 teeth. This drives the wallower (24 teeth) at the top of the upright shaft. At the bottom of the upright shaft is the great spur wheel, which has 40 cogs. The great spur wheel drives a gear with 41 cogs on the crankshaft that powers the vertical frame saws.

== Public access ==
De Jager is open to the public on Saturday between 10:00 and 17:00, or by appointment.
