= Pearl barley =

Barley processed to remove the outer husk

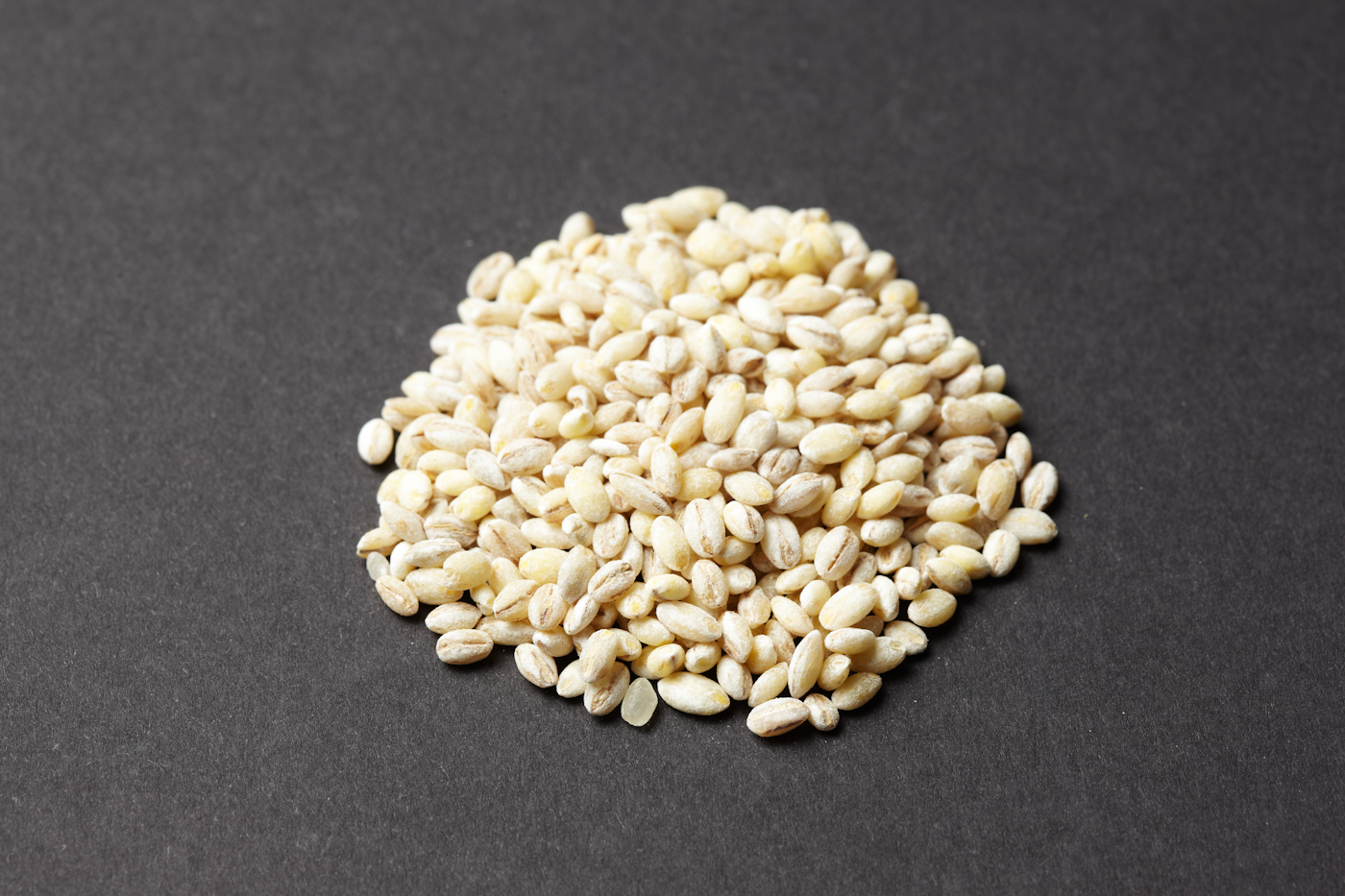
Pearl barley

Pearl barley, or pearled barley, is barley that has been processed to remove its fibrous outer hull and polished to remove some or all of the bran layer.

It is the most common form of barley for human consumption because it cooks faster and is less chewy than other, less-processed forms of the grain such as "hulled barley" (or "barley groats", also known as "pot barley" and "Scotch barley"). Fine barley flour is prepared from milled pearl barley.

Pearl barley is similar to wheat in its caloric, protein, vitamin and mineral content, though some varieties are higher in lysine. It is used mainly in soups, stews, and potages. It is the primary ingredient of the Italian dish orzotto and one of the main ingredients of the Jewish dish cholent and the Polish soup krupnik.
