= Gucci Osteria da Massimo Bottura =

- Interactive map of Gucci Osteria da Massimo Bottura

Restaurant information
- Head chef: Mattia Agazzi
- Food type: Italian
- Rating: Beverly Hills - (Michelin Guide); Florence - (Michelin Guide); Ginza - (Michelin Guide)
- Location: 347 North Rodeo Drive, Beverly Hills, California, 90210, United States
- Coordinates: 34°4′7.3″N 118°24′9.8″W
- Website: gucciosteria.com

Gucci Osteria da Massimo Bottura is a series of Italian restaurants which includes a Michelin-starred location in Beverly Hills, California, as well as its original location in Florence (1 Michelin star) and other locations in Ginza (1 Michelin star) and Seoul.

The Beverly Hills location closed in November 2025.

== See also ==
- List of Italian restaurants
- List of Michelin-starred restaurants in California
- List of Michelin-starred restaurants in Italy
- List of restaurants in Tokyo
