= Woudsend =

Woudsend Wâldsein
- Village
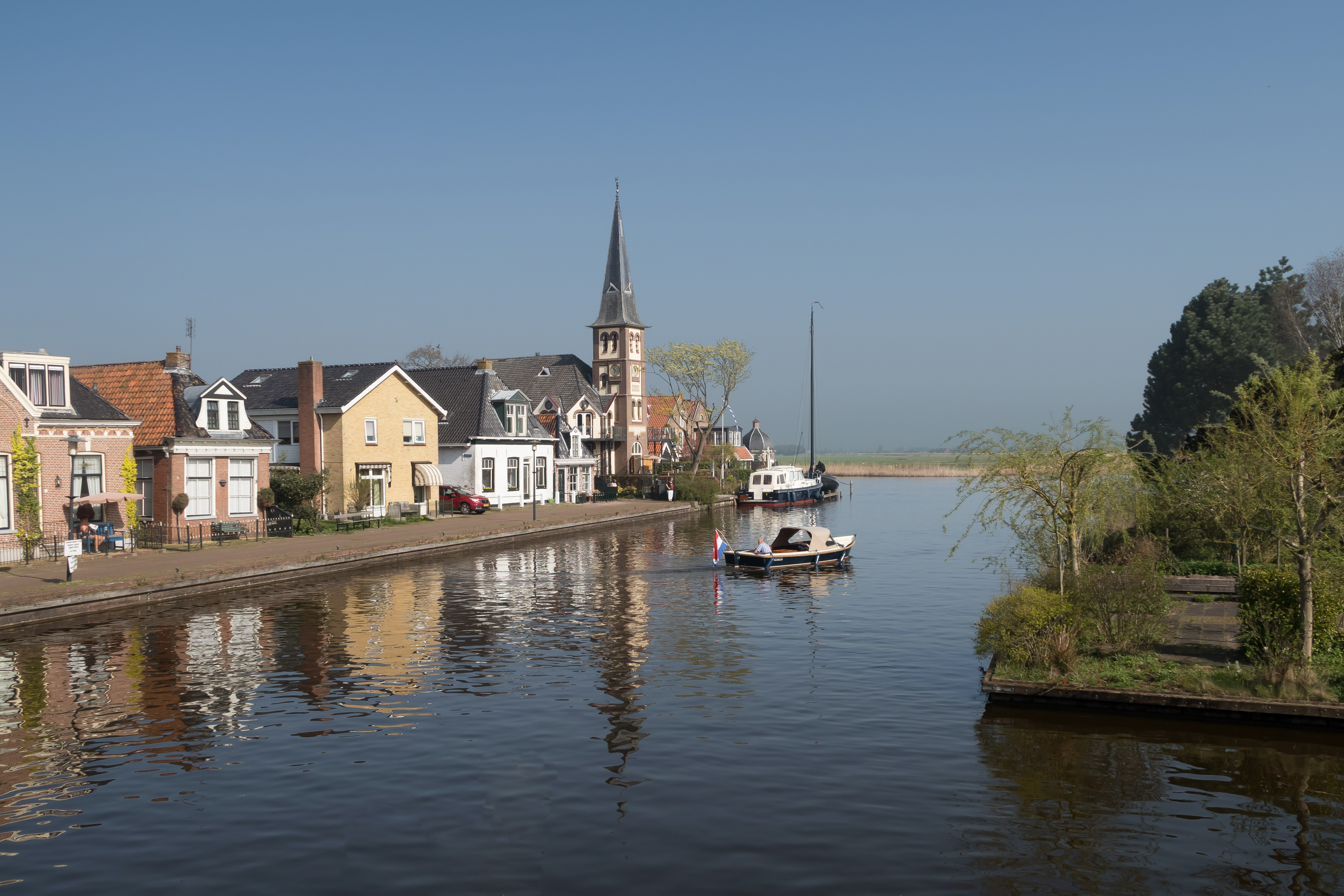

- Flag Coat of arms

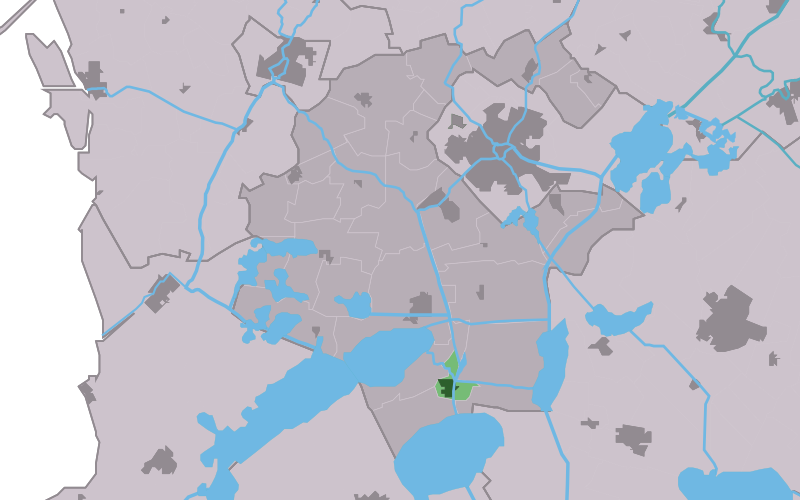
- Location in the former Wymbritseradiel municipality

- Location in the Netherlands Woudsend (Netherlands)
- Country: Netherlands
- Province: Friesland
- Municipality: Súdwest-Fryslân

Area
  - Total: 1.30 km^{2} (0.50 sq mi)
- Elevation: 0.2 m (0.66 ft)

Population (2021)
  - Total: 1,380
  - Density: 1,060/km^{2} (2,750/sq mi)
- Time zone: UTC+1 (CET)
  - Summer (DST): UTC+2 (CEST)
- Postal code: 8551
- Dialing code: 0514

Woudsend (West Frisian: Wâldsein) is a village in Súdwest-Fryslân in the province of Friesland, the Netherlands. It had a population of around 1,380 in January 2017.

There are two windmills in the village, 't Lam and De Jager.

== History ==
The village was first mentioned in 1337 as Woldesende, and means "end (edge) of the wood". Woudsend is a village from the Middle Ages that developed along the Ee river. The economy was mainly based on trade and shipping. The village was densely settled and is characterised by many narrow alleys.

The Dutch Reformed church was built in 1660 as a replacement of the medieval church. The new church was not well founded and started to subside. In 1835, it was decided to build a new church on the other side of the village. The church was completed in 1837. The Catholic St Michael Church was built in 1792 as a clandestine church behind a residential house. In 1933, a tower was added and the church was enlarged. In 1722, a clandestine Mennonite church was built. It was rebuilt in 1858, but sold in 1968 and now serves as a pub.

The village used to be located on the eastern side of the Ee river. During the 19th century, it was extended to the western side of the river. Woudsend was home to 1,181 people in 1840. Before 2011, the village was part of the Wymbritseradiel municipality.

== Gallery ==
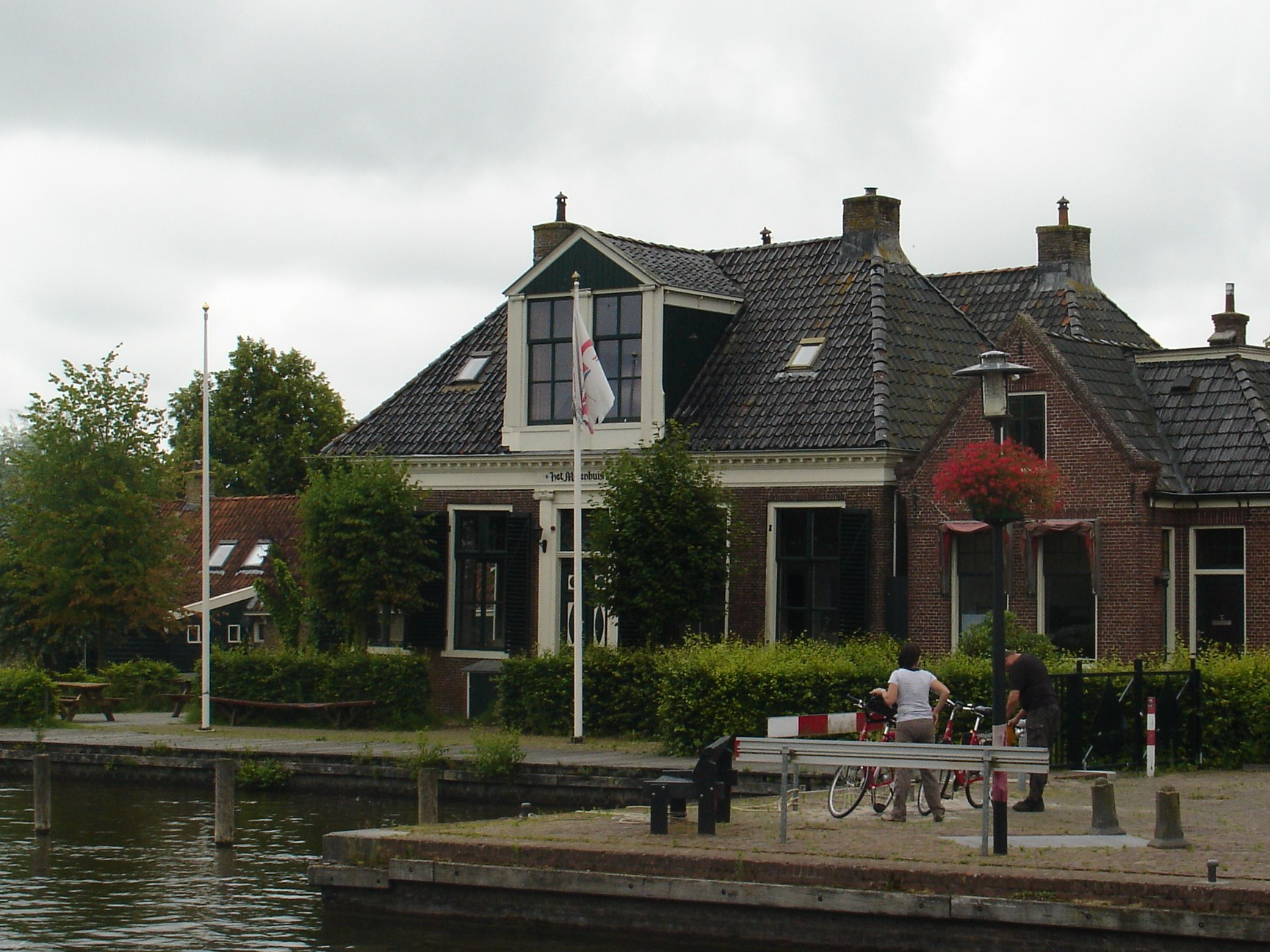
House in Woudsend

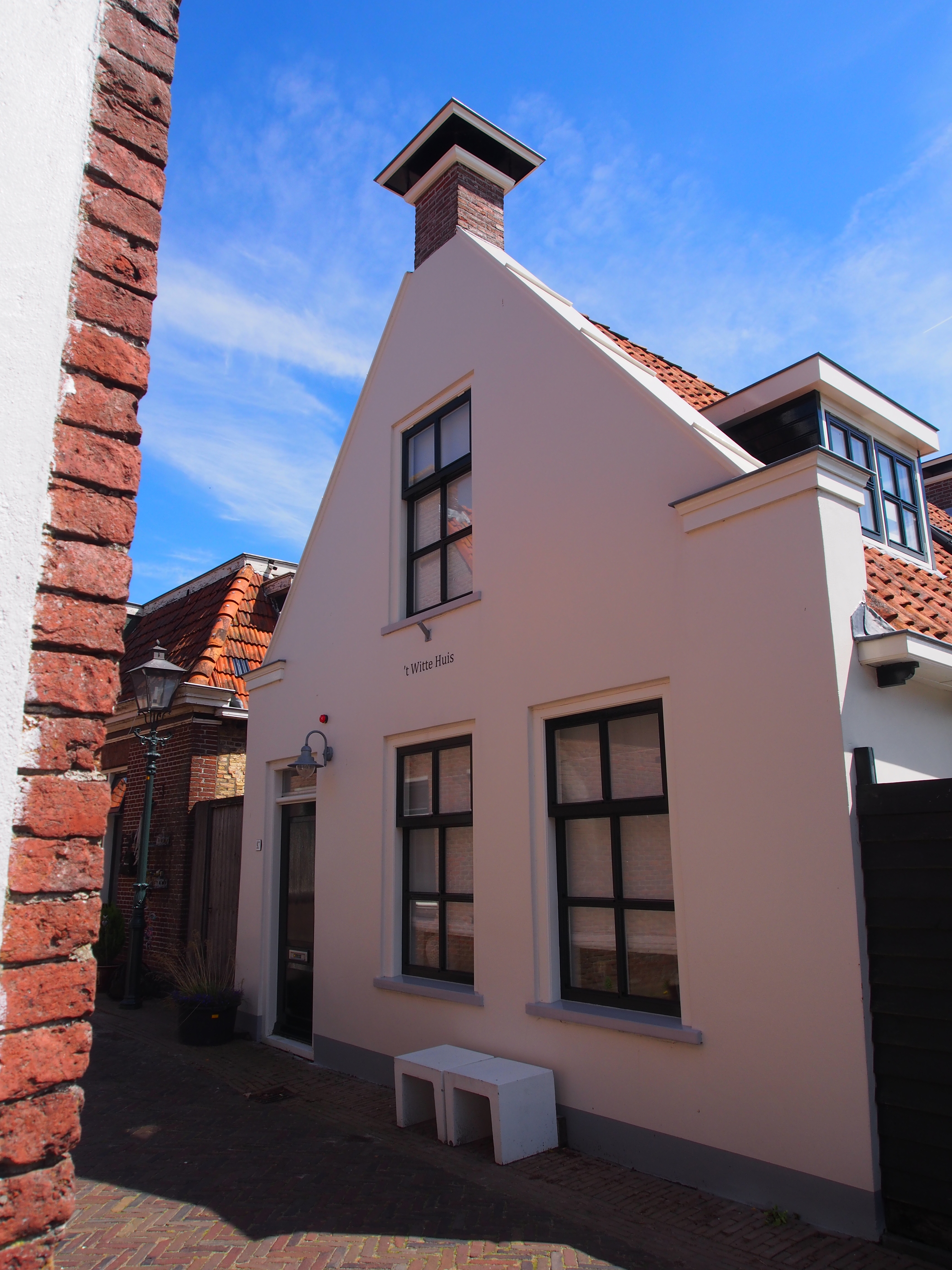
House in Woudsend

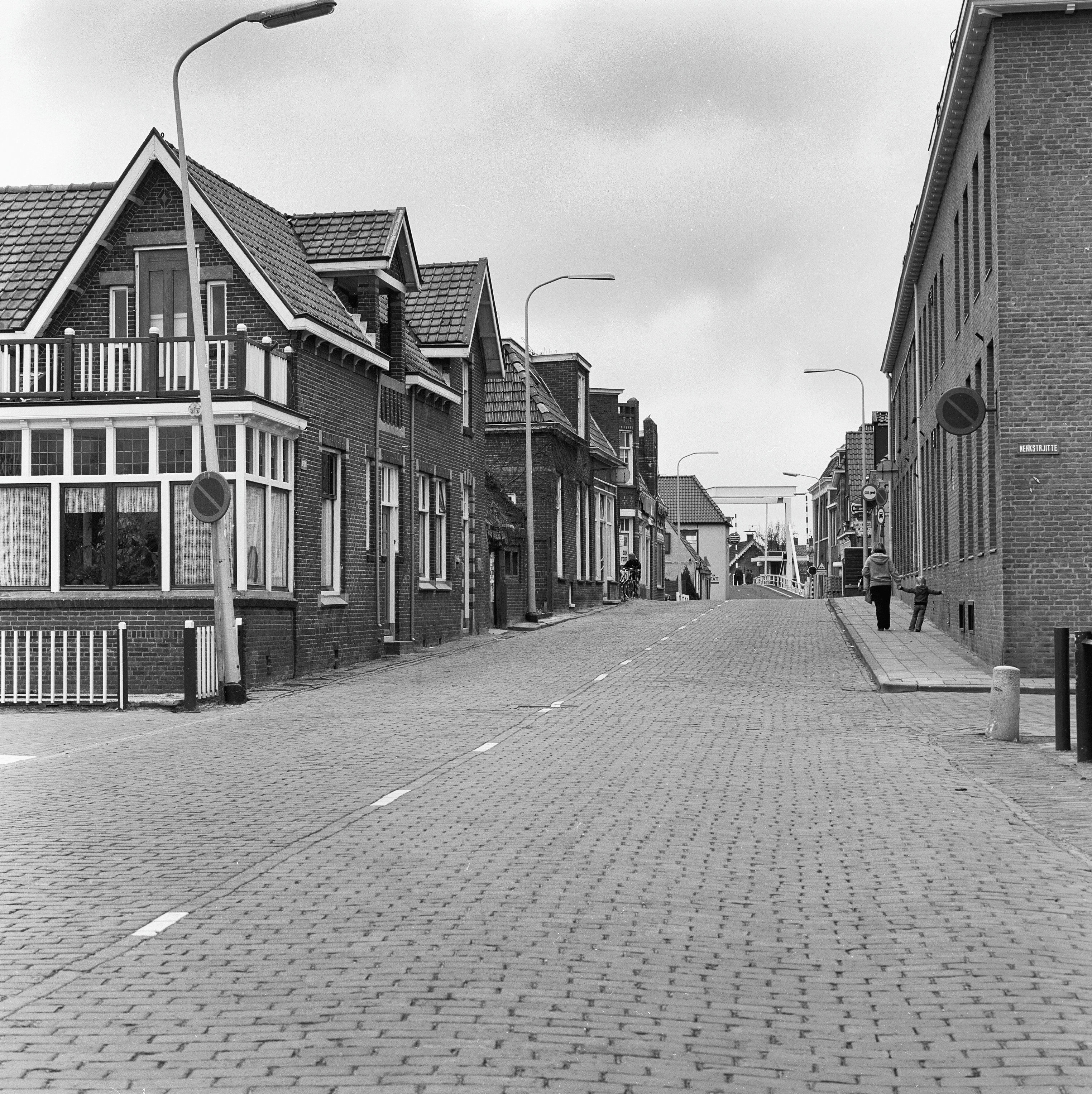
Street view

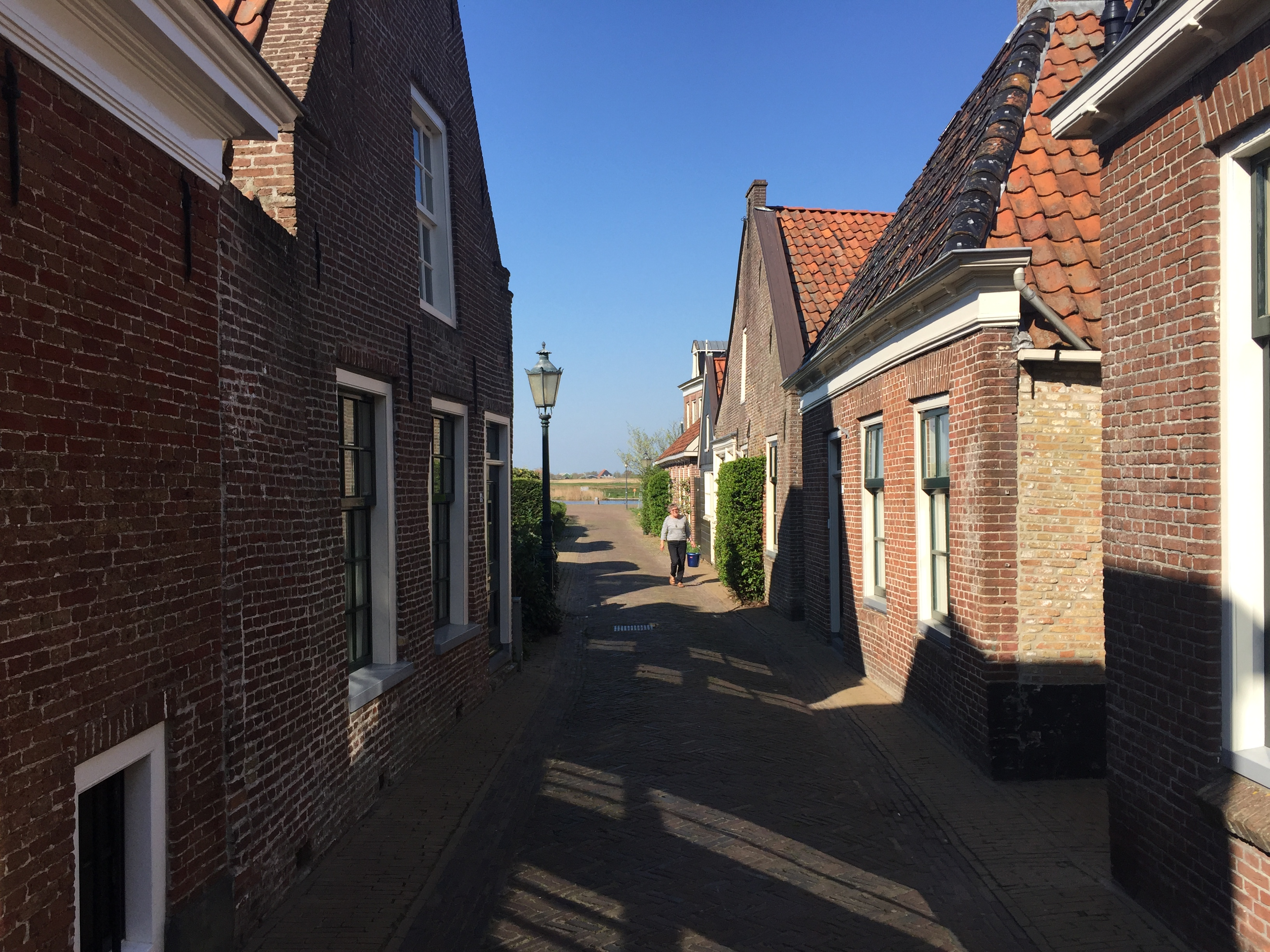
Alley in Woudsend
