= Orzotto =

Italian dish made with pearl barley

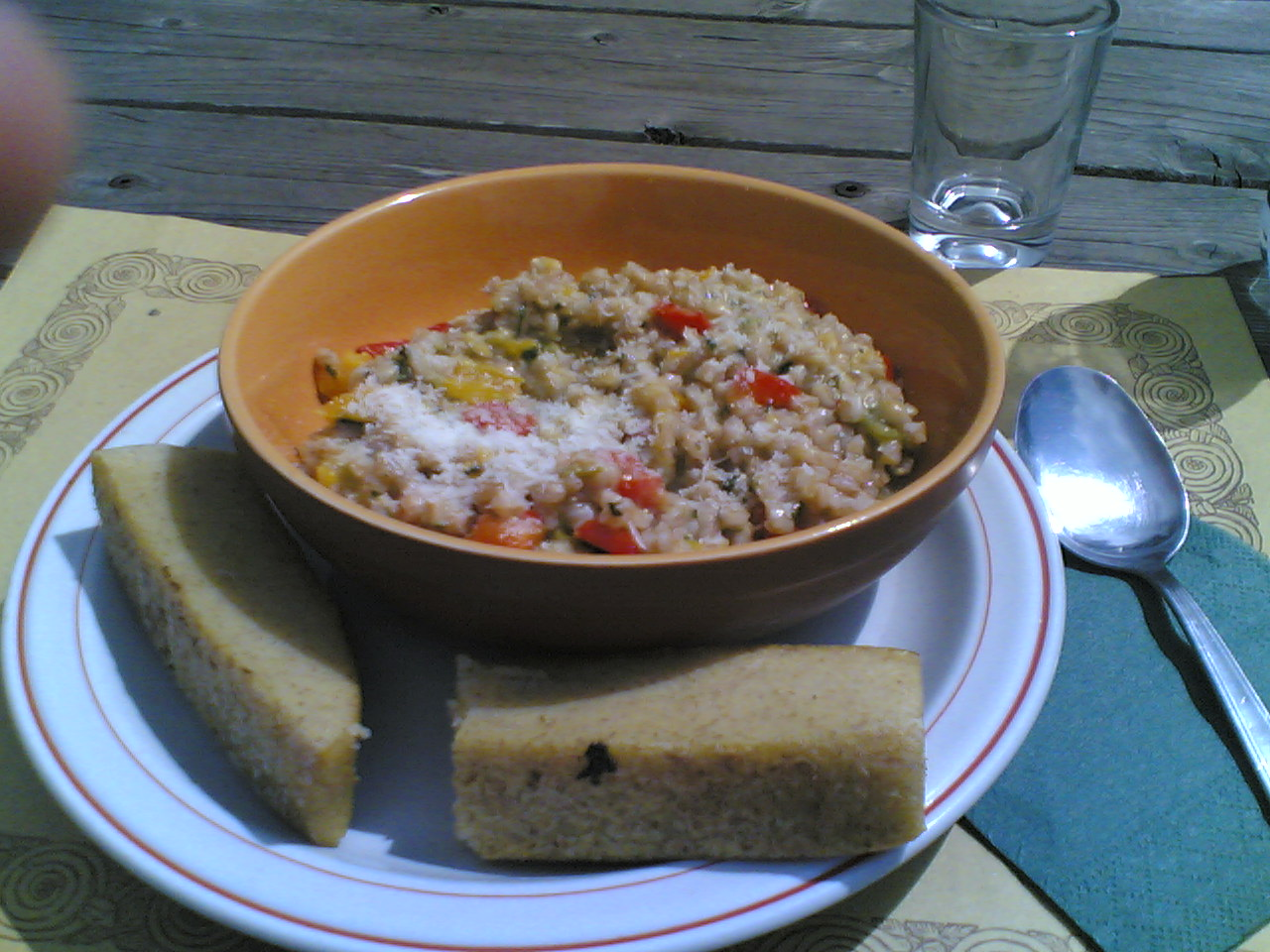
- Orzotto
- Place of origin: Italy
- Main ingredients: Pearl barley
- Similar dishes: Risotto

Orzotto (Italian pronunciation: [orˈdzɔtto]) is an Italian dish similar to risotto, but made with pearl barley instead of rice. Orzotti are a speciality of the Friuli-Venezia Giulia region of northeastern Italy.

The name is a portmanteau of orzo (the Italian word for barley) and risotto. This should not be confused with orzo, otherwise known as risoni, a type of wheat pasta formed into shapes resembling barley grains.

Outside Italy, the term commonly refers to a risotto-style dish made with orzo (pasta).
