= Tyrolean speck =

Variety of ham originally from Tyrol in the Alps

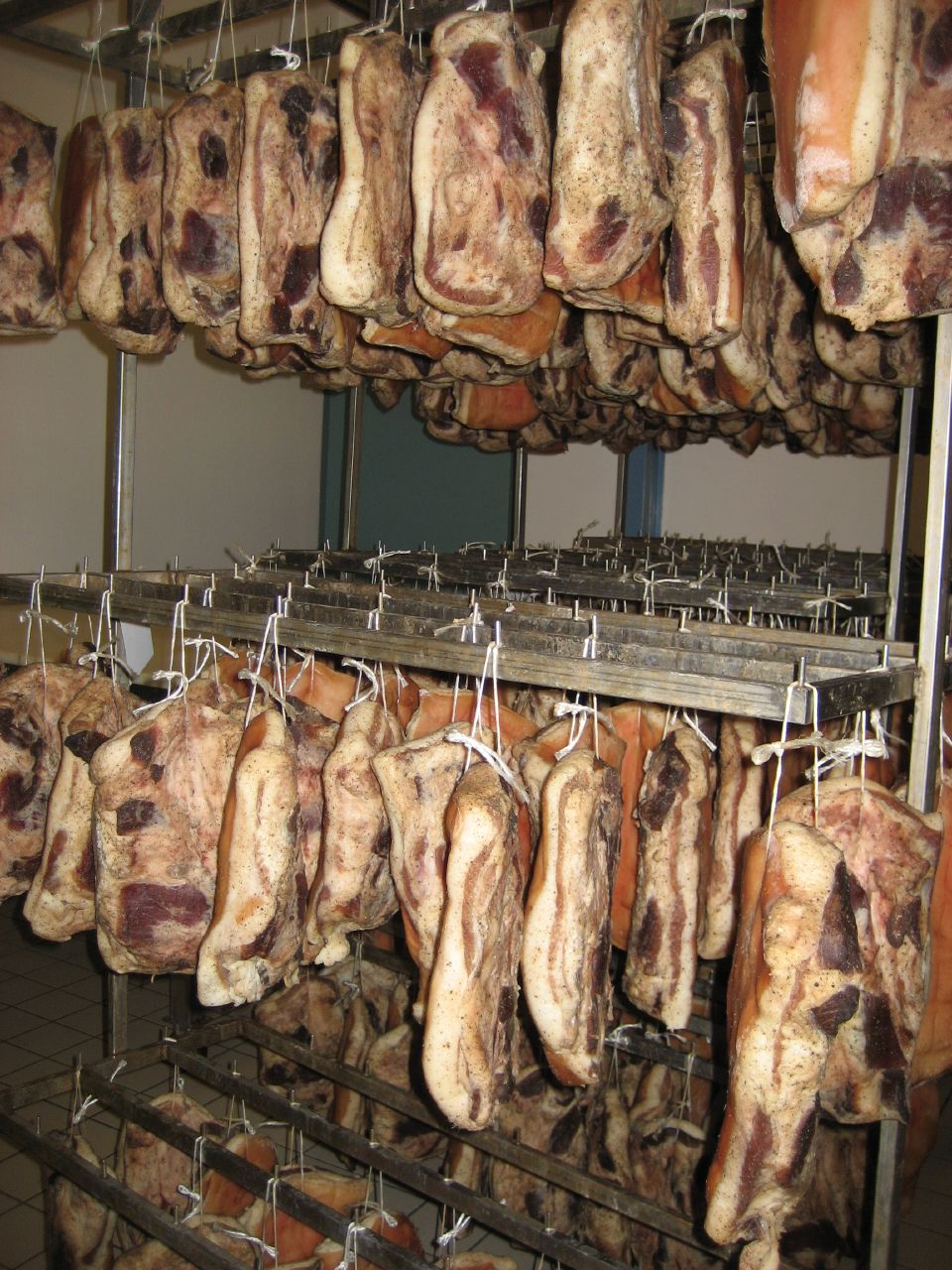

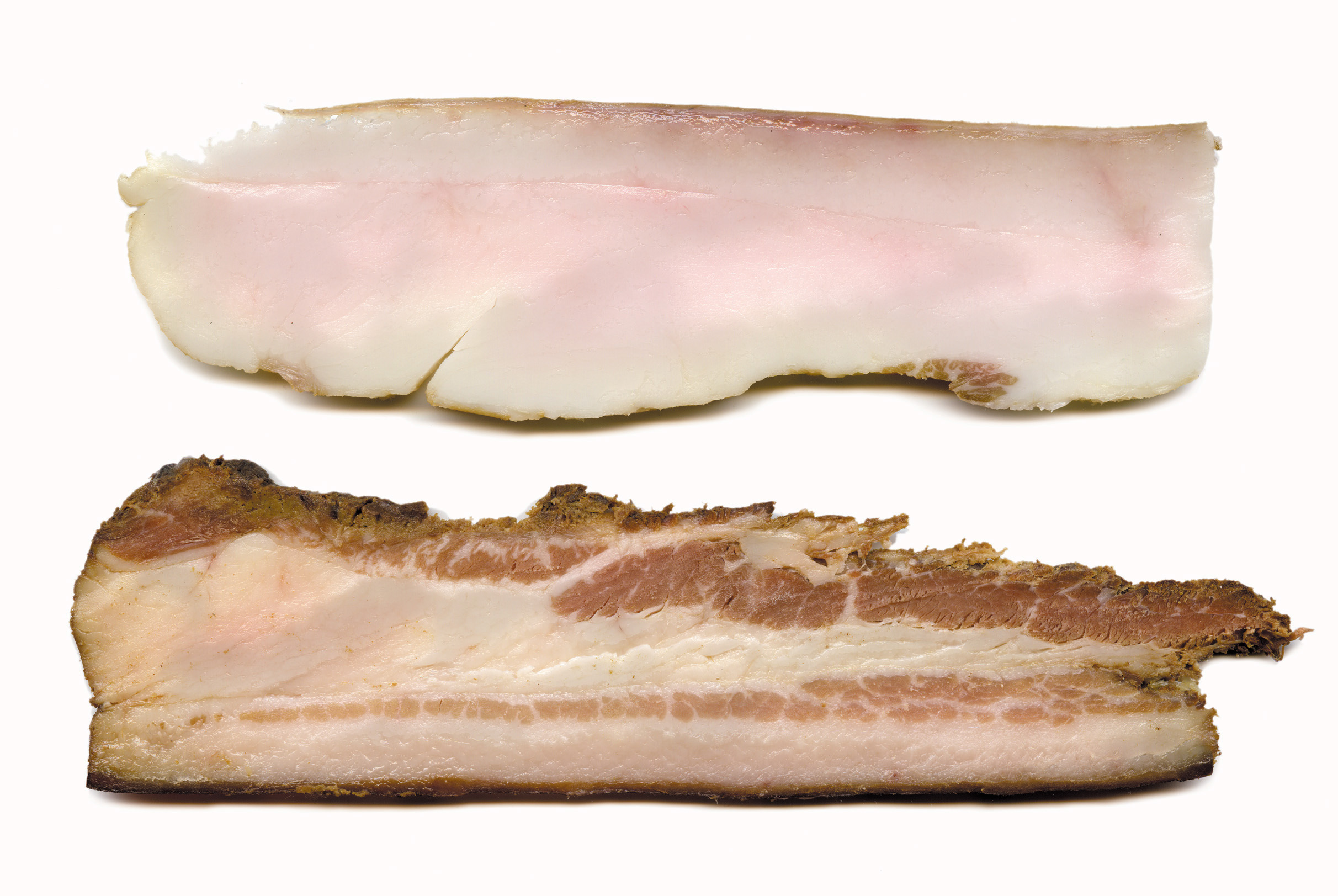

Tyrolean speck is a distinctively juniper-flavored ham originally from Tyrol, a historical Austrian region that since 1918 partially lies in Italy. Its origins at the intersection of two culinary worlds are reflected in its synthesis of salt-curing and smoking.

The first historical mention of Tyrolean speck was in the early 13th century, when some of the current production techniques were already in use. Südtiroler speck (Italian: Speck Alto Adige) is now a protected geographic designation with PGI status.

== Curing ==
Like prosciutto and other hams and most German speck, Tyrolean speck is made from the hind leg of the pig. It is deboned before curing.

A leg of pork is deboned and divided into large sections called "baffe", and then cured in salt and one of various spice combinations, which may include garlic, bay leaves, juniper berries, nutmeg, and other spices, and then rested for a period of several weeks. After this, the smoking process begins.

Tyrolean speck is cold-smoked slowly and intermittently for two or three hours a day for a period of roughly a week, using woods such as beech at temperatures that never exceed 20°C (68°F). It is then matured for five months.

== Uses ==
Tissue-thin slices of speck can also be served with horseradish, pickles and dark rye bread.

Typically appearing alongside hearty whole-grain breads, Tyrolean speck can also be seen in the company of shellfish, sometimes wrapped around scallops or rolled about breadsticks and served with lobster salad. Speck can be cut into thick strips and added to pasta sauces or any dish beginning with a soffritto of olive oil and chopped vegetables. In dishes such as risotto, the extremely strong flavour of Tyrolean speck can usually be cut with light flavours such as parsley, lemon, mint, etc. In salads, Tyrolean speck pairs well with apples, sprouts, mushrooms, and hearts of celery. In Italy, speck is most often paired with radicchio as a topping for pizzas, or a condiment for pastas or risotto. This reflects the germano-venetic culture common in the extreme north east.

Tyrolean speck can easily replace bacon or as a smoky alternative to pancetta. The differences between Tyrolean speck and bacon include different time lengths of smoking, the technique of curing it, and the fact that Tyrolean speck cures for a longer period of time than bacon does.

== See also ==
- List of hams
- List of dried foods
- List of smoked foods
- Speck Alto Adige
