= Kletzenbrot =

Sweet fruit and nut bread

- Alternative names: Tyrolean dried fruit bread
- Type: Sweet bread
- Place of origin: Austria
- Region or state: Tyrol
- Main ingredients: Dried pears (Kletzen), dried fruits, nuts, flour, spices

Kletzenbrot is a sweet bread with dried fruits, especially dried pears (called Kletzen in Austrian German) made for the Advent season in some Christian countries, notably associated with the Austrian state of Tyrol, and sometimes called Tyrolean Dried Fruit Bread. Modern varieties are usually made with dried fruits and nuts like walnuts, raisins, currants, dried apples, figs and prunes. Most recipes add spices like cinnamon, cloves, anise, nutmeg, and rum for extra flavor. There are many possible varieties of the loaf, which is sometimes made with rye flour for a dark brown loaf, but can also be made with whole wheat flour. The flour can either be just incorporated in the dough with the dried fruit or it can be used to make an extra dough coating.

== Ingredients ==
Modern recipes are not limited to the traditional dried pears but include an assortment of nuts and dried fruits like raisins, currants, dates, prunes and figs. It's a quickbread made by adding sodium bicarbonate and buttermilk to the sifted dry ingredients, then folding in any chopped nuts or dried fruits. It is often decorated with blanched almonds.

== See also ==
- List of sweet breads
