= Marzocca =

Marzocca is an Italian surname. Notable people with the surname include:

- Gioia Marzocca (born 1979), Italian fencer
- Marco Marzocca (born 1962), Italian actor and comedian
