= Krupnik (soup) =

Polish soup made from potatoes and barley groats

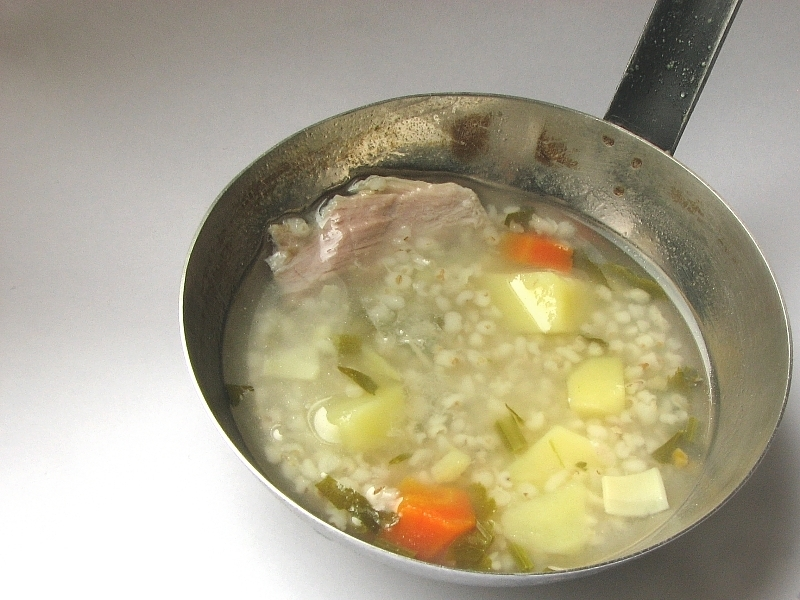
- Krupnik in a ladle
- Type: Soup
- Place of origin: Poland
- Serving temperature: Hot
- Main ingredients: Broth, potatoes, barley groats
- Ingredients generally used: Carrots, parsley, leek, celery, onion, meat

Krupnik (Polish: [ˈkrupɲik]) is a thick Polish soup made from vegetable or meat broth, containing potatoes and barley groats (kasza jęczmienna, archaically called krupy—hence the name). Common additional ingredients include włoszczyzna (carrots, parsley, leek, and celery), onion, meat, and dried mushrooms.
