= Speck Alto Adige =

Dry-cured ham from South Tyrol, Italy

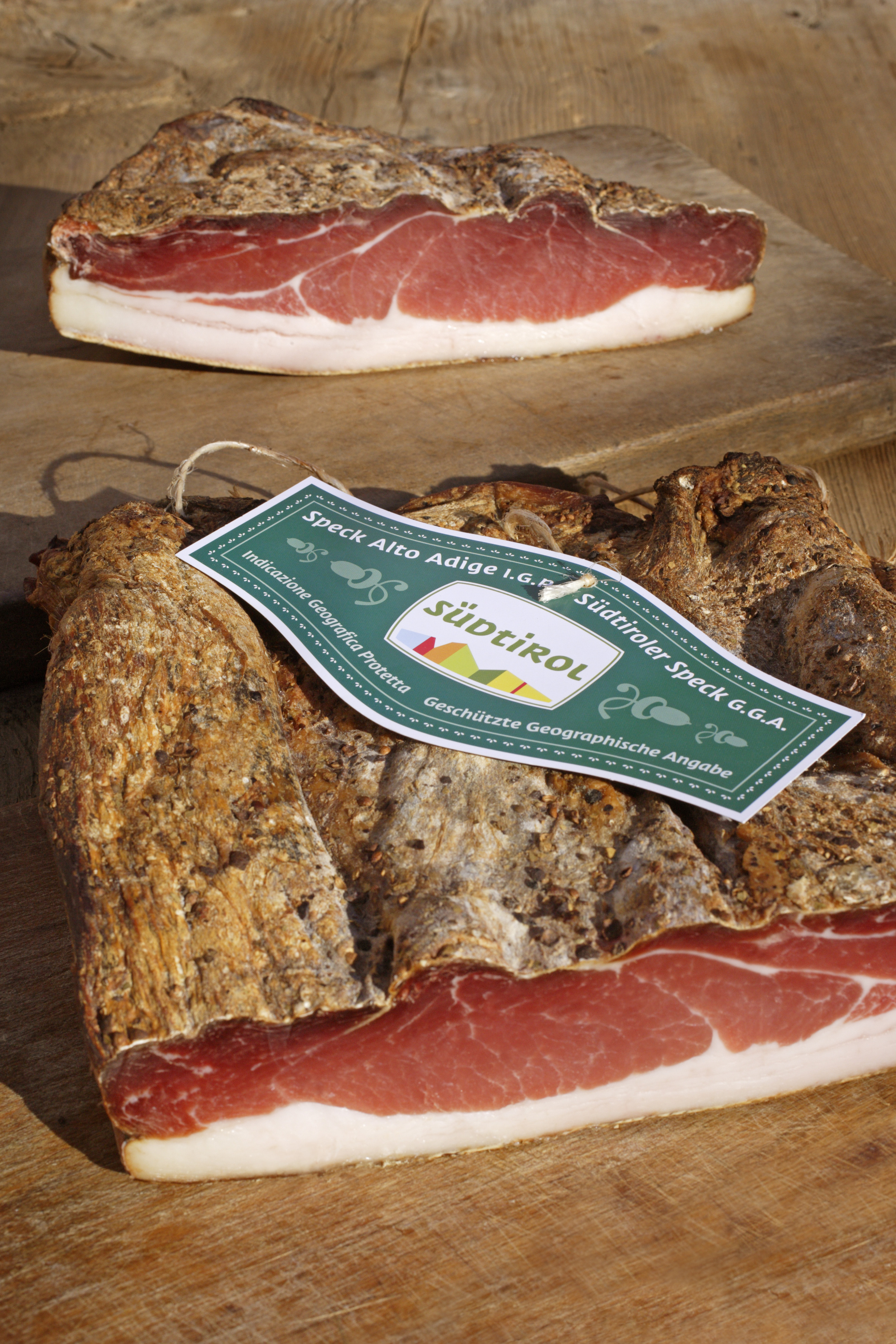
- Place of origin: Italy
- Region or state: South Tyrol
- Food energy (per serving): 300 kcal/1,254 kJ

Speck Alto Adige is a dry-cured, lightly smoked ham produced in South Tyrol, northern Italy. Parts of its production are regulated by the European Union under the protected geographical indication (PGI) status (see also: Tyrolean speck).

Unlike prosciutto, speck Alto Adige is smoked (prosciutto affumicato).

== Inspection and quality brand ==
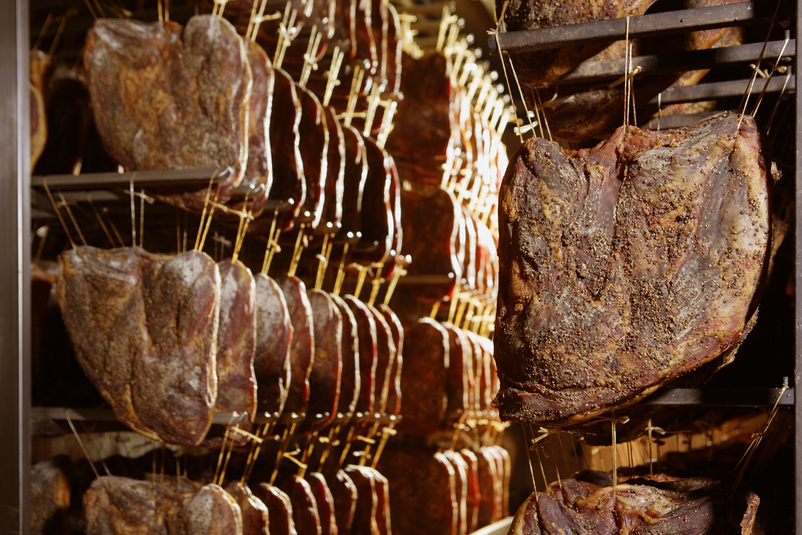
Maturing of Speck Alto Adige

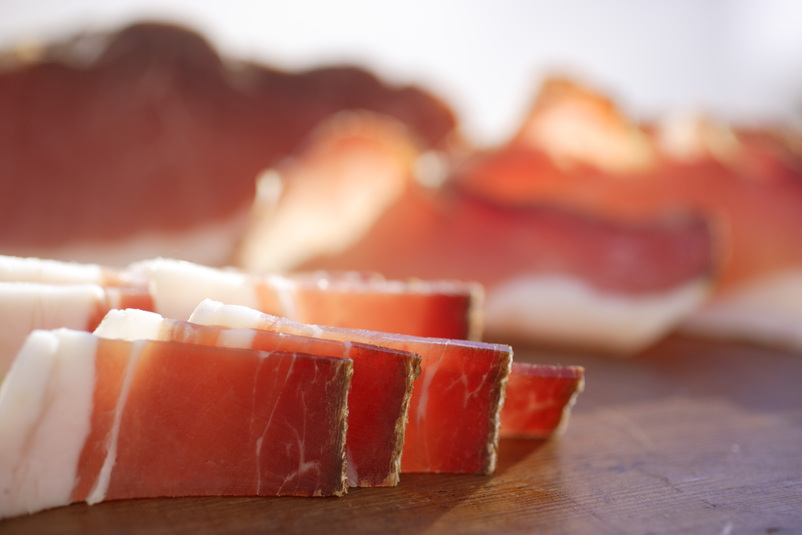
Speck Alto Adige cut in slices

Speck Alto Adige PGI is protected by the European Union as a protected geographical indication (PGI). This status is assigned only to selected products obtained according to traditional methods and in specific geographical areas.

To guarantee the quality and authenticity of Speck Alto Adige PGI, the quality consortium Südtiroler Speck Consortium, together with the independent control institute INEQ (Istituto Nord Est Qualità), has developed an inspection system applied to all production phases, from meat selection to the finished product.

== Nutrition information ==
Speck Alto Adige has a high protein content. The nutrition facts per 100 g serving are:

Energy	1254 kJ (300 kcal)
Protein	30.70 g
Fat	19.10 g
Carbohydrates	< 0.50 g

== Events linked to Speck Alto Adige ==
The most famous event linked to Speck Alto Adige is the Südtiroler Speckfest, namely the traditional speck festival held each year in fall in St. Magdalena, Villnöß/Funes, at the base of the Dolomites mountain range. The Südtiroler Speckfest, in 2010 at its 8th edition, is an event organized together by the Villnöß tourism association, the Südtiroler Speck Consortium quality consortium and the EOS – South Tyrol Export Organization of the Chamber of Commerce of Bolzano. Each year, at the festival, Hans Mantinger "Gletscherhons", a master in the art of slicing speck, presents his surprise creations.

== See also ==
- List of hams
- List of dried foods
- List of smoked foods
- Tyrolean speck
