= Jiugong (disambiguation) =

Jiugong may refer to:

- Jiugong, an area in northern Daxing District, Beijing
- Jiugong Station, a subway station on the Yizhuang Line of the Beijing Subway
- Jiugong Mountains, a mountain range in Hubei
