= Wugong =

Wugong may refer to:

- Wugong County, in Shaanxi, China
- Wugong, Henan
- Wugong, Hebei
- Wugong Mountains, a range of mountains located in Jiangxi and Hunan, China
- Chinese martial arts, also known as Wugong (武功)
