= Jinhua ham =

Chinese cured ham

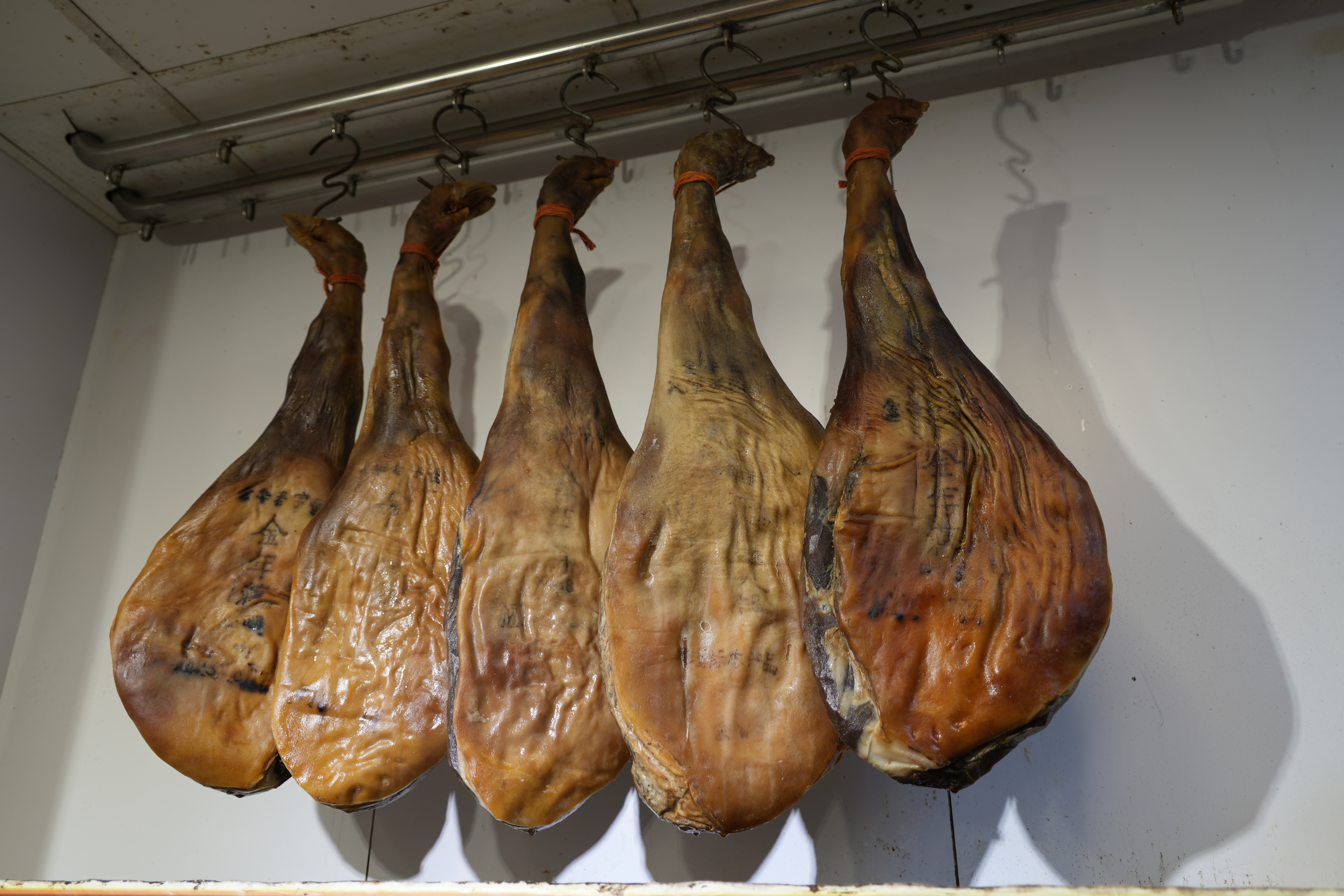
- Jinhua ham
- Alternative names: Kinhwa ham; Chinhua ham
- Type: Dry-cured ham
- Place of origin: China
- Region or state: Jinhua
- Associated cuisine: Chinese cuisine
- Main ingredients: Pork

Jinhua ham
- Traditional Chinese: 金華火腿
- Simplified Chinese: 金华火腿
Transcriptions
Standard Mandarin
- Hanyu Pinyin: Jīnhuá huǒtuǐ
- Wade–Giles: Chin^{1}-hua^{2} huo^{3}-t'ui^{3}

Jinhua ham (Chinese: 金華火腿) is a type of specialty dry-cured ham named after the city of Jinhua, where it is produced, in Zhejiang province, China. The ham is used in Chinese cuisines to flavor stewed and braised foods as well as for making the stocks and broths of many Chinese soups. The ham was awarded first prize in the 1915 Panama International Merchandise Exhibition.

== Production ==
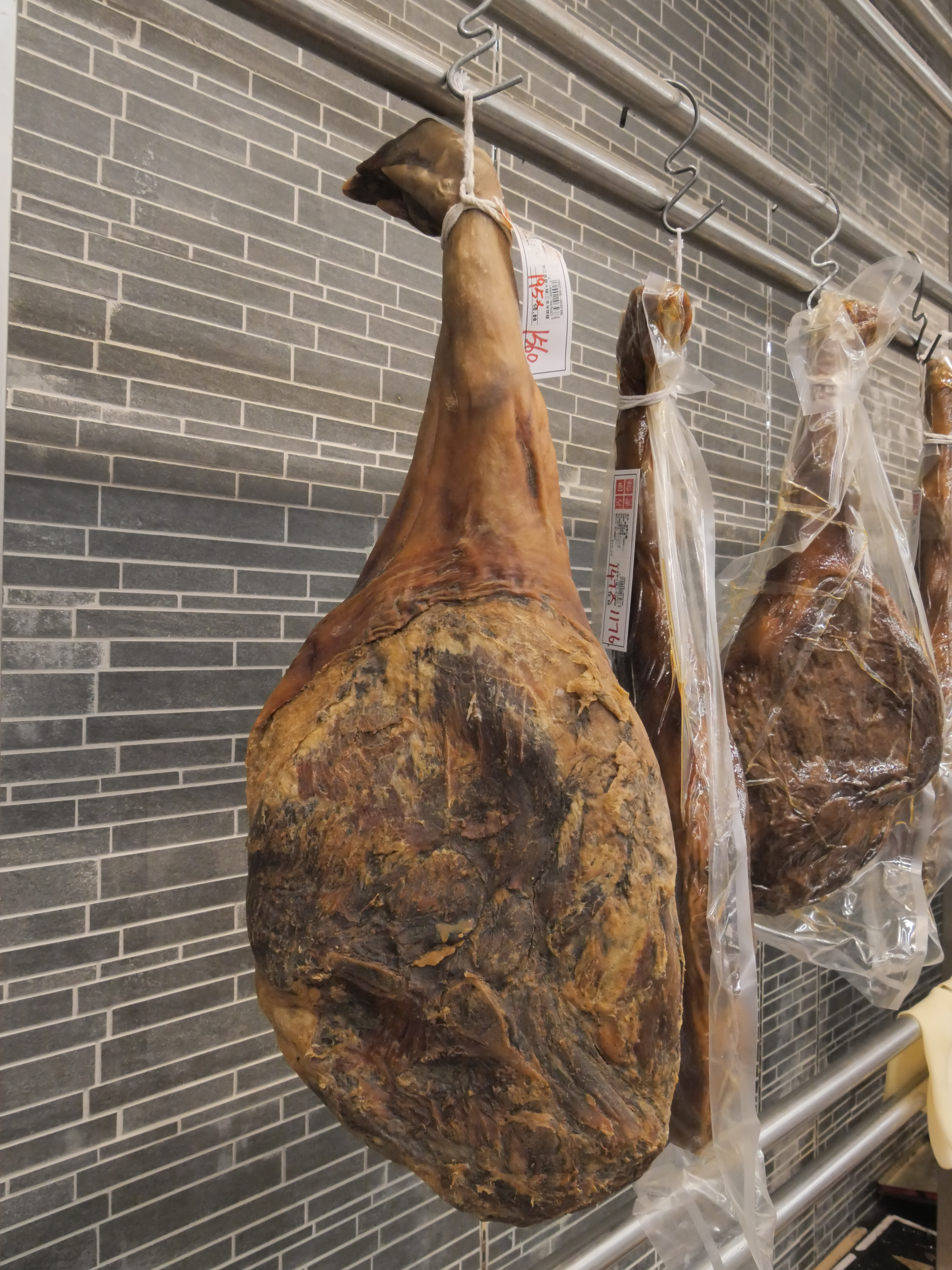
Jinhua ham in Hong Kong

Jinhua ham is traditionally produced using the hind legs of a breed of pig native to China known as the "two ends black" (兩頭烏), which have black hair growing on their heads and hindquarters with white midsections. This breed is quick to mature; it has excellent meat quality and thin skin. Ham production begins when air temperatures drop below 10 °C (50 °F). The process takes approximately 8 to 10 months to complete.

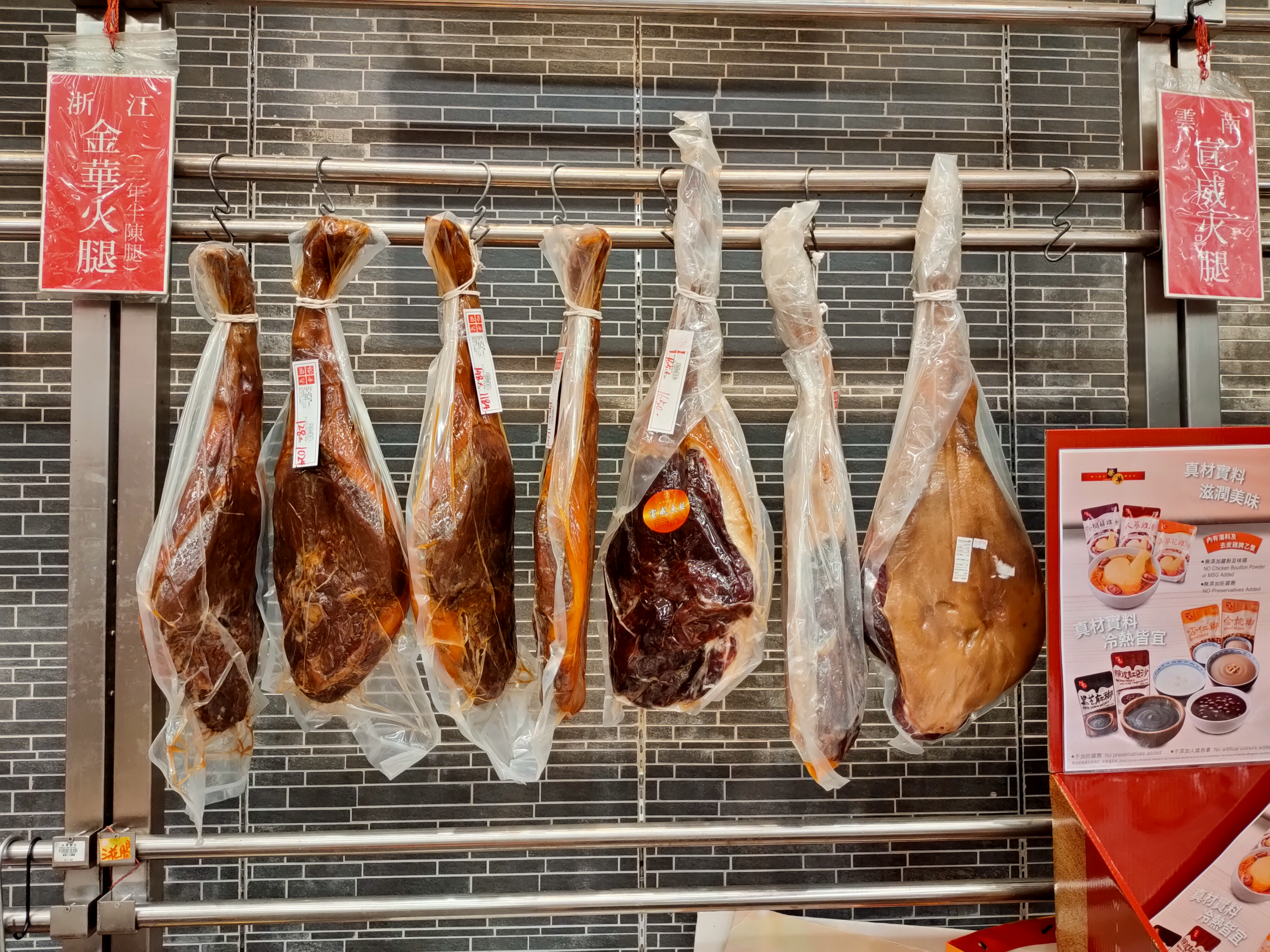
Wrapped hams

Ham production is separated into six stages, starting in the winter and ending the following autumn:

1. Meat preparation: Well-developed and undamaged legs are selected and the "open" side of the leg is trimmed of fat, tendons, membranes, and other connective tissues. The remaining blood in the legs should also be squeezed out.
2. Salting: Salting is done at a temperature between 5–10 °C (41–50 °F), since lower temperatures reduce salt penetration and hinder bacterial growth. Salt is repeatedly rubbed onto the meat and allowed to absorb over the span of many days, using a specialized method and mnemonic which indicates the order and the important areas of the ham to salt. The salting process is repeated 5–7 times, with an average time of 1 month. Only plain salt is used, though some producers also include sodium nitrate in the salting process.
3. Soaking and washing: After the leg is well salted and partially dry, it is soaked in water for 4–6 hours and then scrubbed. After the initial washing, the hams are then soaked for another 16–18 hours.
4. Drying and shaping: The hams are trimmed to the desired bamboo leaf shape, dehooved, branded with an iron, and then hung up to dry in the sun. Sun-drying is terminated when the hams begin to drip liquefied fat, which usually takes a week's worth of sun.
5. Ripening: The dried hams are hung in a low-temperature room of 15 degrees at 55–57% humidity and allowed to dry, cure, and develop aromas over 6–8 months. During this period, the hams ferment through molding, and the proteins and fats hydrolyze through endogenous enzymes. This improves the ham's flavor by creating free amino acids and flavor compounds.
6. Post-ripening: The ripened ham is brushed clean of mold and dust, and a thin layer of vegetable oil is then applied to soften the ham and prevent the fat's excessive oxidation. The dried hams are piled on top of one another and allowed to further ripen for 2–3 months, which allows the flavors to stabilize and intensify.

New processing techniques involving adjustments in aging temperature and humidity can accelerate production and reduce the time down to 1–2 months.

== Culture ==
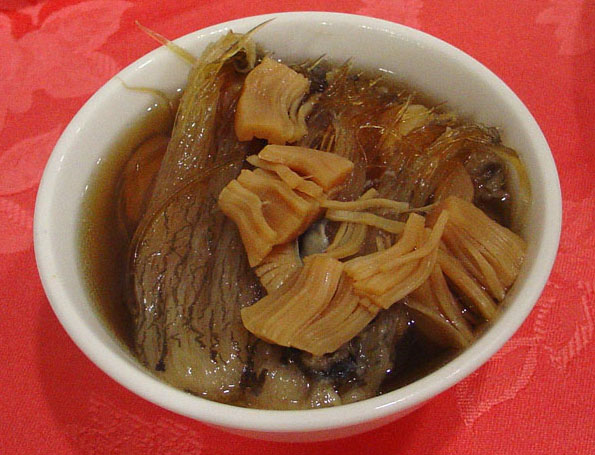
Jinhua ham is an ingredient in the dish Buddha Jumps Over the Wall

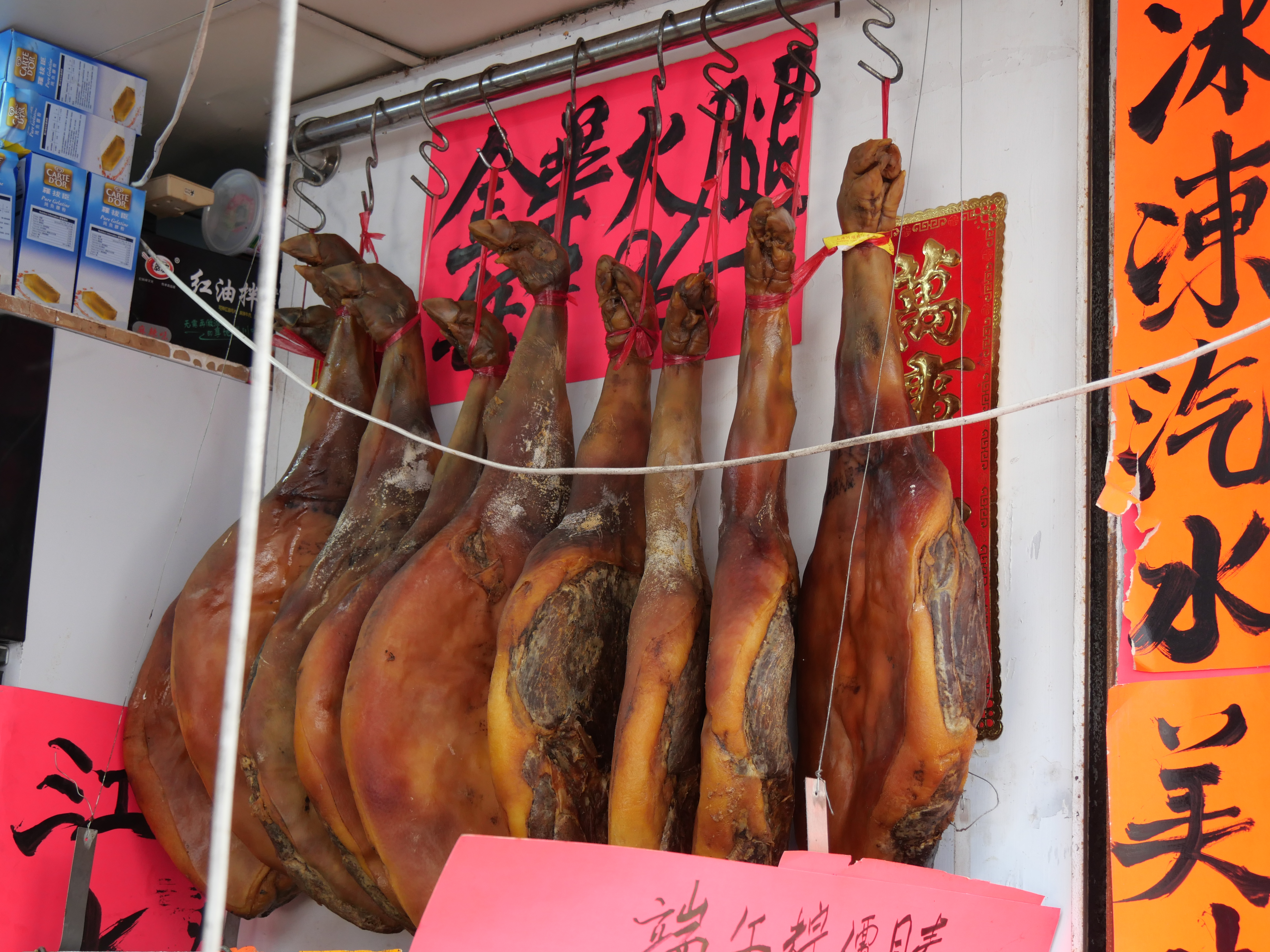
Drying in a store in Yau Ma Tei, Hong Kong

The earliest recorded mention of the Jinhua ham processing technique is during the Tang dynasty (618–907 AD), and this method of dry ham production is reported by some to have been in turn transmitted to Europe by Marco Polo. The name Jinhua was bestowed by the first emperor of the southern Song dynasty. It is highly regarded in Chinese cuisine, and may be eaten as part of a cold meat dish or used in producing soup stock, imparting its unique, umami flavor to any dish. Jinhua ham is an important ingredient in the dish Buddha jumps over the wall. The ham has been lauded in Chinese literature, and was prominently featured in the Qing dynasty novel Dream of the Red Chamber, when the cuisine of the nobility was being described.

The ideal ham should have certain physical characteristics, such as a shiny and smooth yellow outside, a rounded shape in the style of a bamboo leaf, small joint and hoof, a thin and slender bone, an abundant layer of fat surrounding dark and red toned meat, a pronounced but not unpleasant odor, a fine textured meat with high levels of intramuscular fat, and a taste that is highly salty, umami, and sweet. The outside of the ham may have small amounts of mold, but this is considered normal and thought to contribute to the ham's flavor.

== Chemical analysis ==
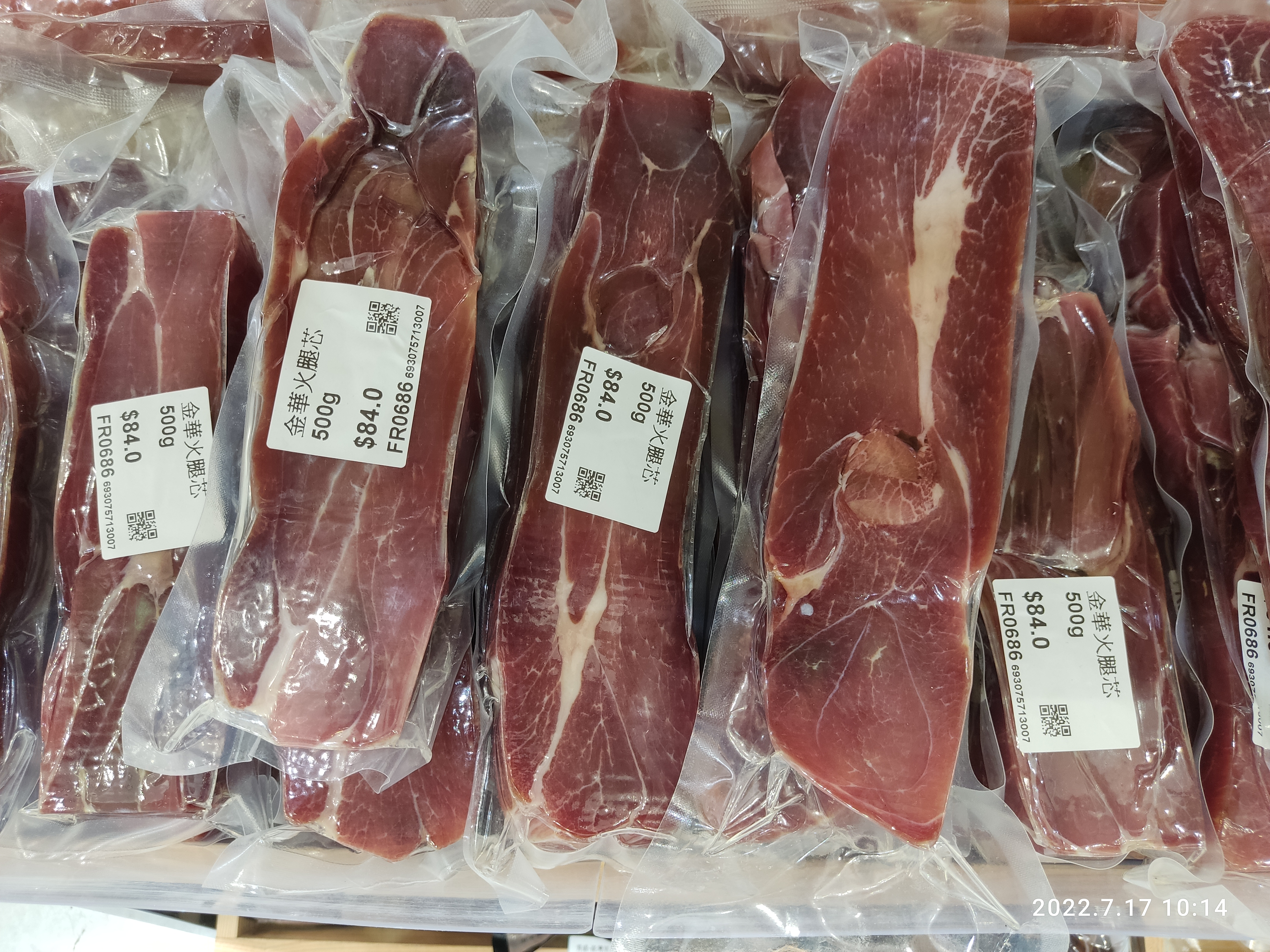
Sliced and packaged

The taste of Jinhua ham arises from the high concentration of free amino acids and nucleotides in the ham, more specifically, glutamic acid and 5'-inosinic acid. Although the total amount of amino acids is not different from the uncured ham, the high proportion of the free compounds from the long curing process allows for the highly umami taste of the ham. The taste is also contributed by fermentation, due largely to the molds and some yeasts present on the ham.

The aroma and the aroma compounds of Jinhua ham are similar to that of dry-cured Iberian hams but different from light Italian and Parma hams. This is likely due to the longer aging and environmental exposure of both Jinhua and Iberian hams. The fragrant compounds consist of aldehydes, sulfur compounds such as methanethiol and dimethyl disulfide, and branched alkenes, which are derived from the breakdown and rearrangement of amino acids and fatty acids caused by auto-oxidation and fermentation.

== Pesticide scandal ==
In 2003, Jinhua ham was the center of a controversial food safety incident in China. In the incident, several small producers of Jinhua hams operated out of season and produced hams during warmer months, treating their hams with pesticides to prevent spoilage and insect infestation. The hams were soaked in the pesticide dichlorvos, which is a volatile organophosphate insecticide used for fumigation. The incident strongly affected legitimate makers of the ham and caused a sharp drop-off in market demand.

== See also ==
- Jamón ibérico
- List of hams
- List of dried foods
- Prosciutto
- Smithfield ham

Chinese hams

- Anfu ham
- Rugao ham
- Xuanwei ham
