= Rugao ham =

Chinese dry-cured ham

Rugao ham (Chinese: 如皋火腿; pinyin: Rúgāo Huǒtuǐ) is a dry-cured ham that originated in Jiangsu province, China. It dates to the Qing dynasty, and was first prepared circa 1851. Rugao ham is produced in a variety of flavors, colors and weights. The local breed of Jiangquhai pigs are typically used for the ham. In contemporary times, it is produced in Rugao, Jiangsu province, which the ham is named after. It is a well-known ham in China.

Per the Chinese calendar, Rugao ham is produced in the winter, whereby the curing process begins between November and December, and also in spring, between January and February.

== See also ==
- List of hams

Chinese hams

- Anfu ham
- Jinhua ham
- Xuanwei ham
