= Fushui River =

River in Hubei, China

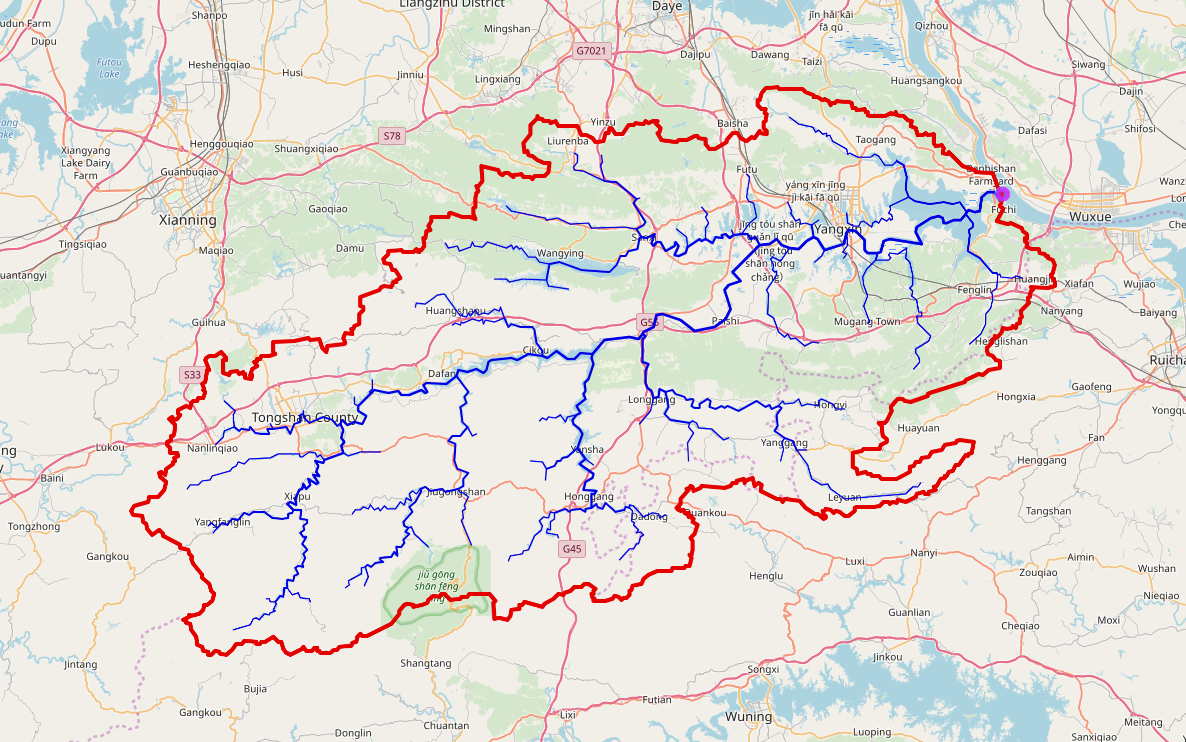
Fushui river basin

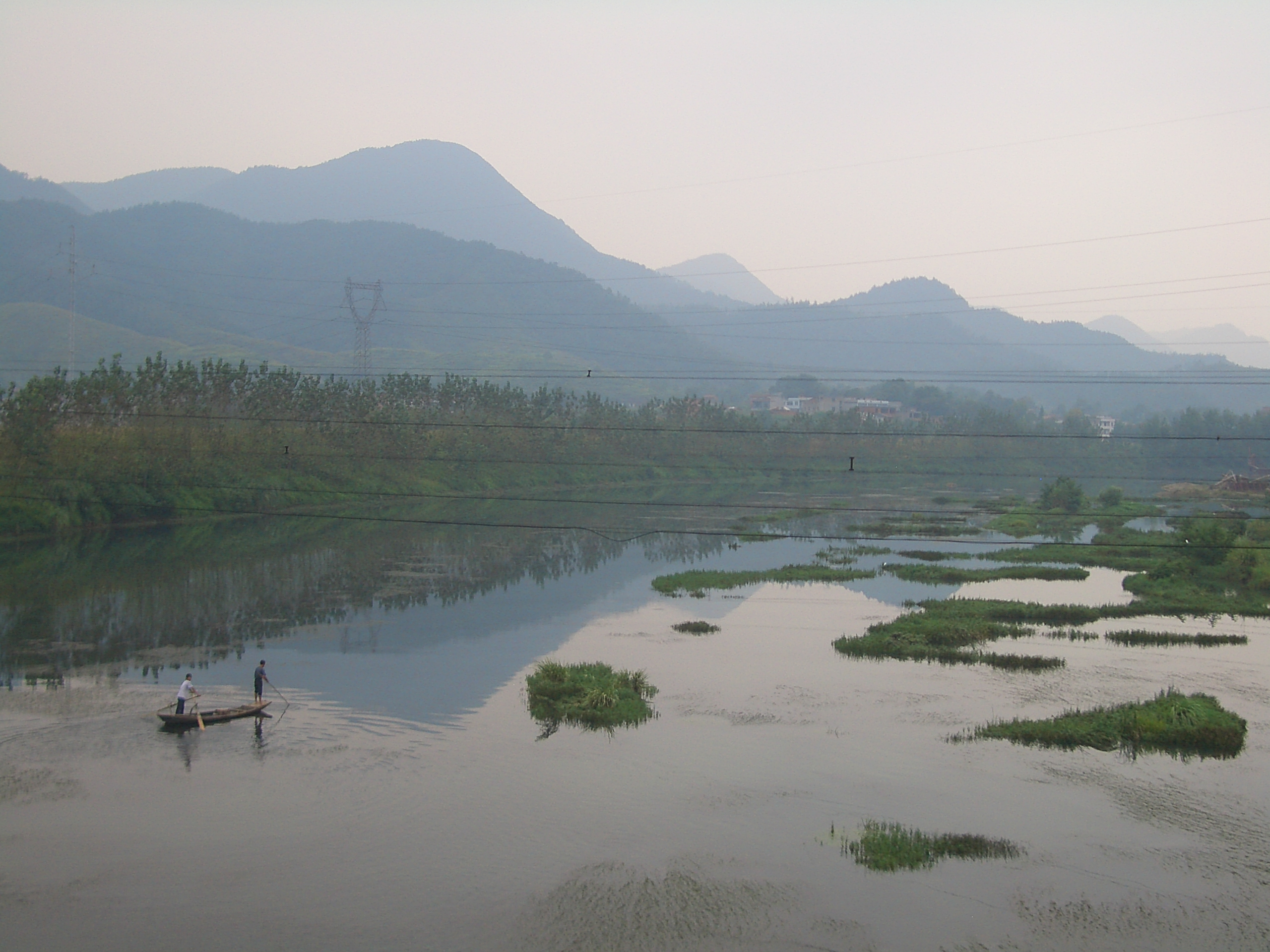
Fushui River in Yangxin County

The Fushui River (富水) is a river flowing through Tongshan and Yangxin Counties in the south-eastern part of Hubei province, China.

== Size and origin ==
The river is 196 kilometres (122 mi) long. It originates in the Mufu Mountains, flows in the general eastern direction, and discharges into the Yangtze River near Fuchi Town, Yangxin County (29°51′38″N 115°26′28″E).

== Dams ==
There are a number of dams on the river and its tributaries. The most major or them, the Fushui Dam (富水大坝; 29°41′26″N 114°53′17″E) is located in Yangxin County just east of the Tongshan County's county line. The dam creates a fairly large Fushui Reservoir (富水水库).

The Xianning Nuclear Power Plant is under construction in Dafan Town, Tongshan County, on the northern shore of the Fushui Reservoir (29°40′20″N 114°41′05″E); it is expected to use the reservoir's water for cooling and various ancillary purposes.

China National Highway 316 runs alongside the river for parts of its length.

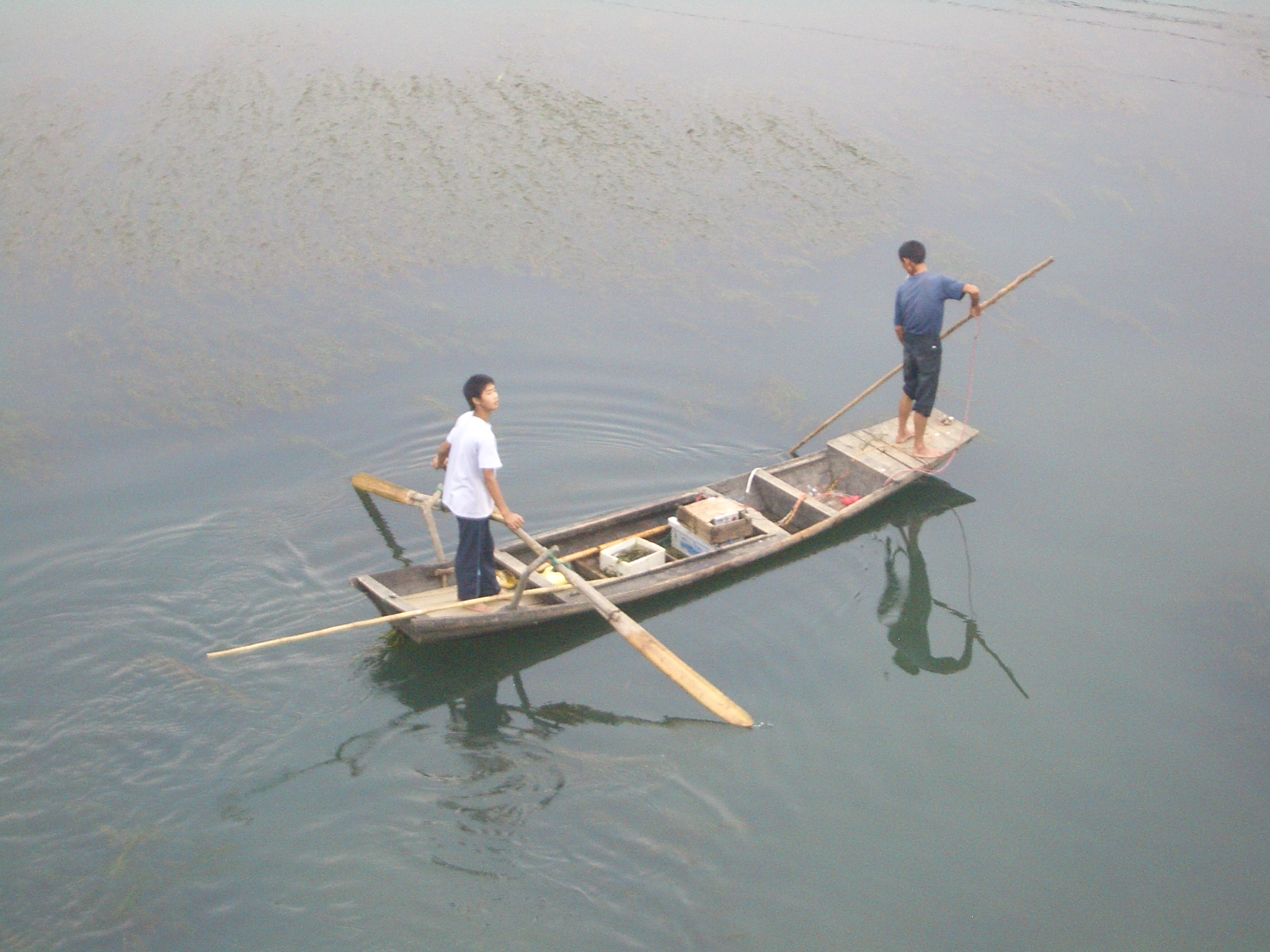
Fishermen on the Fushui River
