= Jiuling Mountains =

Mountain range in Jiangxi, China

Jiuling Range 九岭山 / 九嶺山
- Location within Eastern China Location within China

Highest point
- Elevation: 1,794 m (5,886 ft)
- Coordinates: 28°52′N 114°56′E

Geography
- Location: Jiujiang, China
- Parent range: Luoxiao Mountains

The Jiuling Mountains (simplified Chinese: 九岭山; traditional Chinese: 九嶺山; pinyin: Jiǔlǐng Shān) are a range of mountains located in Jiujiang, China.

== Description ==
The Jiuling range is a subrange of the Luoxiao Mountains forming parallel ridges oriented in a southwest/northeast direction.
