= Xuanwei ham =

Chinese dry-cured ham

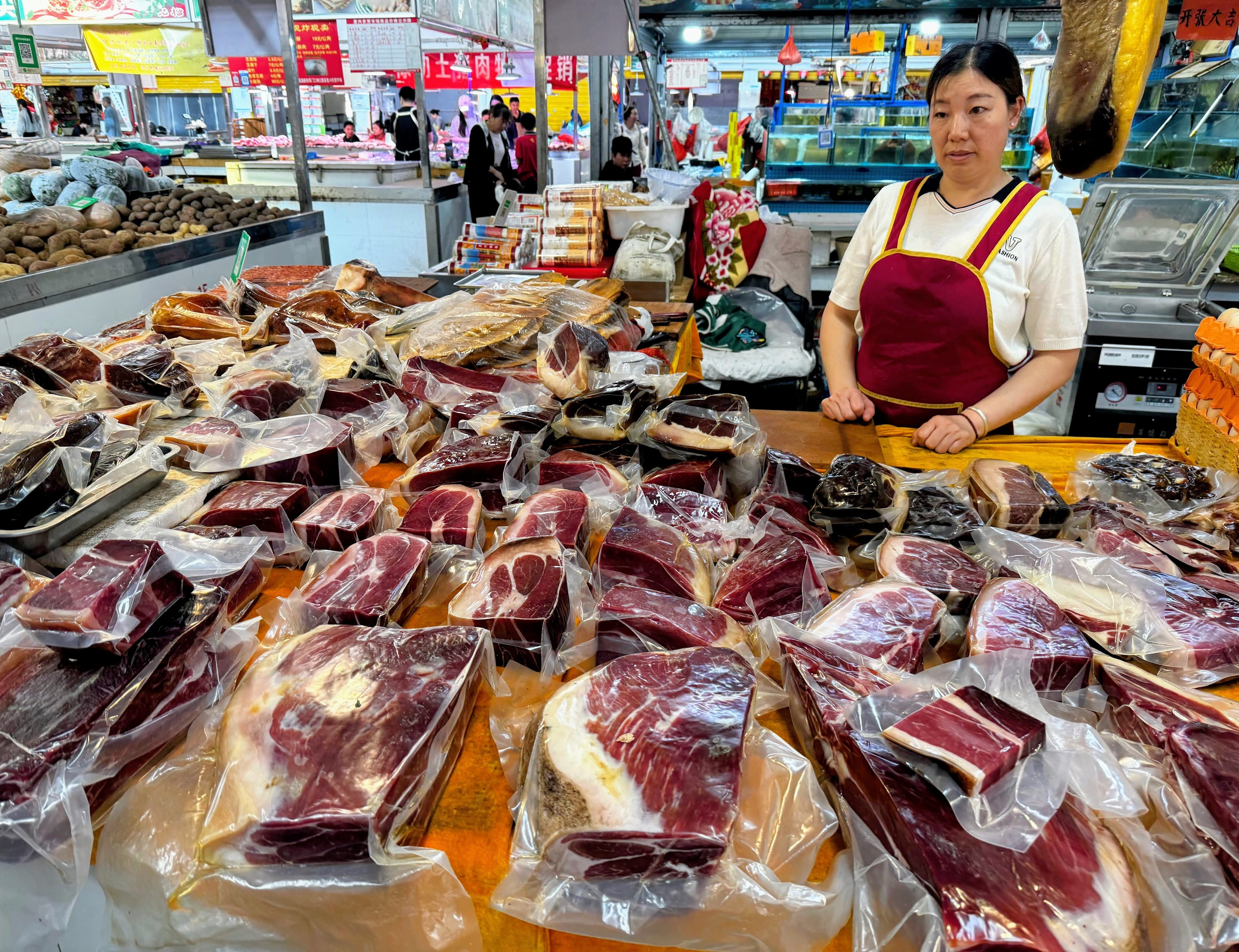
A lady selling Xuanwei ham in Kunming

Xuanwei ham (Chinese: 宣威火腿; pinyin: Xuānwēi huǒtuǐ) is a dry-cured ham in Qujing Prefecture of Yunnan province, China. Xuanwei ham has a 250-year history dating back to 1766. In 1909, it was first mass-produced and gained popularity. In 1915, Xuanwei ham won a gold medal at Panama International Fair. Xuanwei ham enjoys a high reputation both internationally and locally. The ham is "rose-red" in color and similarly shaped to a pipa.

== History ==
Xuanwei ham was first created and produced in 1909 by a businessman in Yunnan, China.

In 1911 they started canning the ham and it was first shipped around the world in 1912.

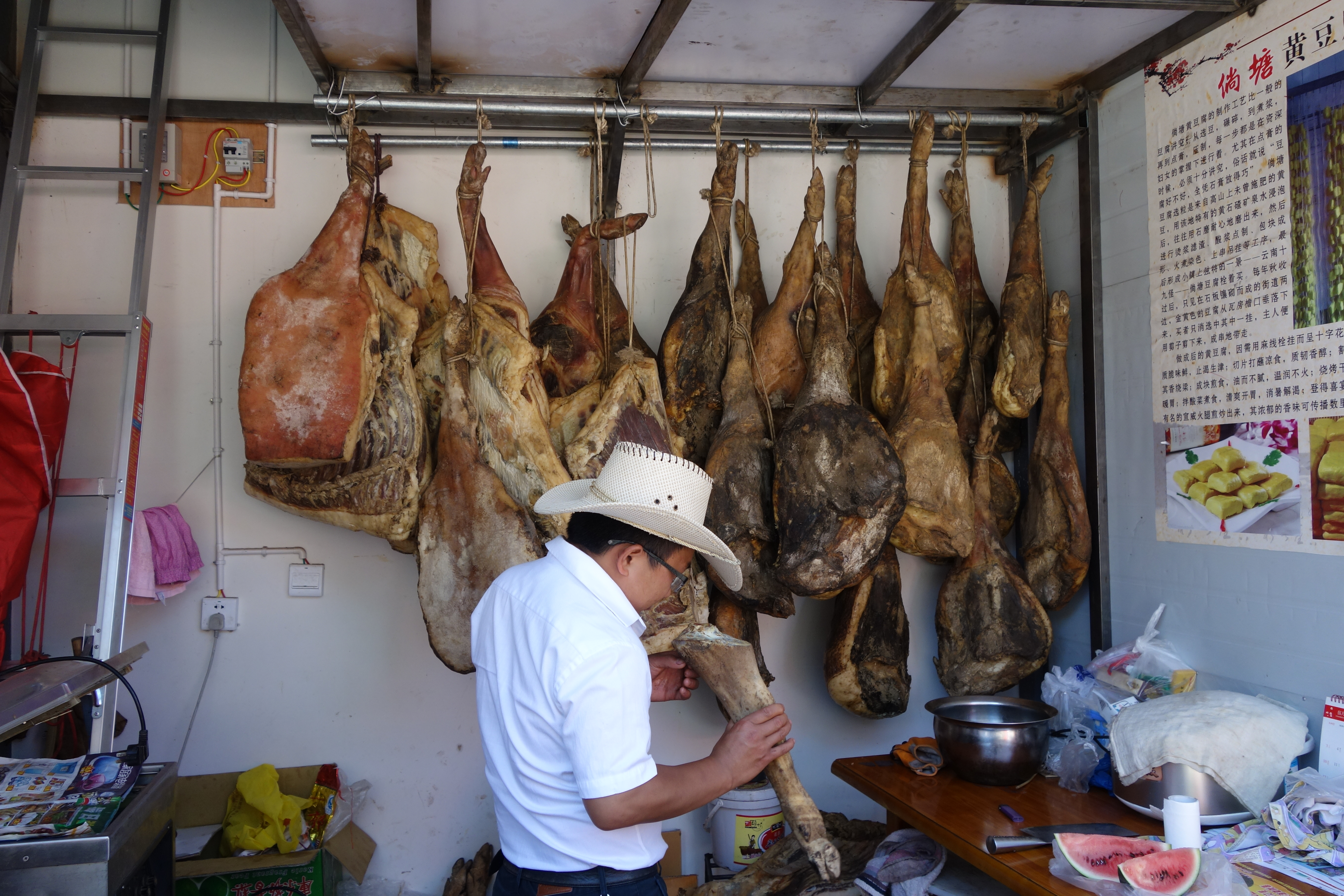
Xuanwei ham in a butcher shop

In 1915 Xuanwei ham won a gold medal at the Panama International Fair. After that it was shipped all across the world and became an international sensation. The current production rate is at 10,000 tons.

In 2001 its production center was moved by the PRC.

== Preparation ==
Mostly the pigs of the Wujin breed from the Xuanwei district are used to make Xuanwei ham because of the high body fat content and muscle quality. During the processing of Xuanwei ham, the green legs are salted three times before put in a ventilated chamber for 8–12 months.

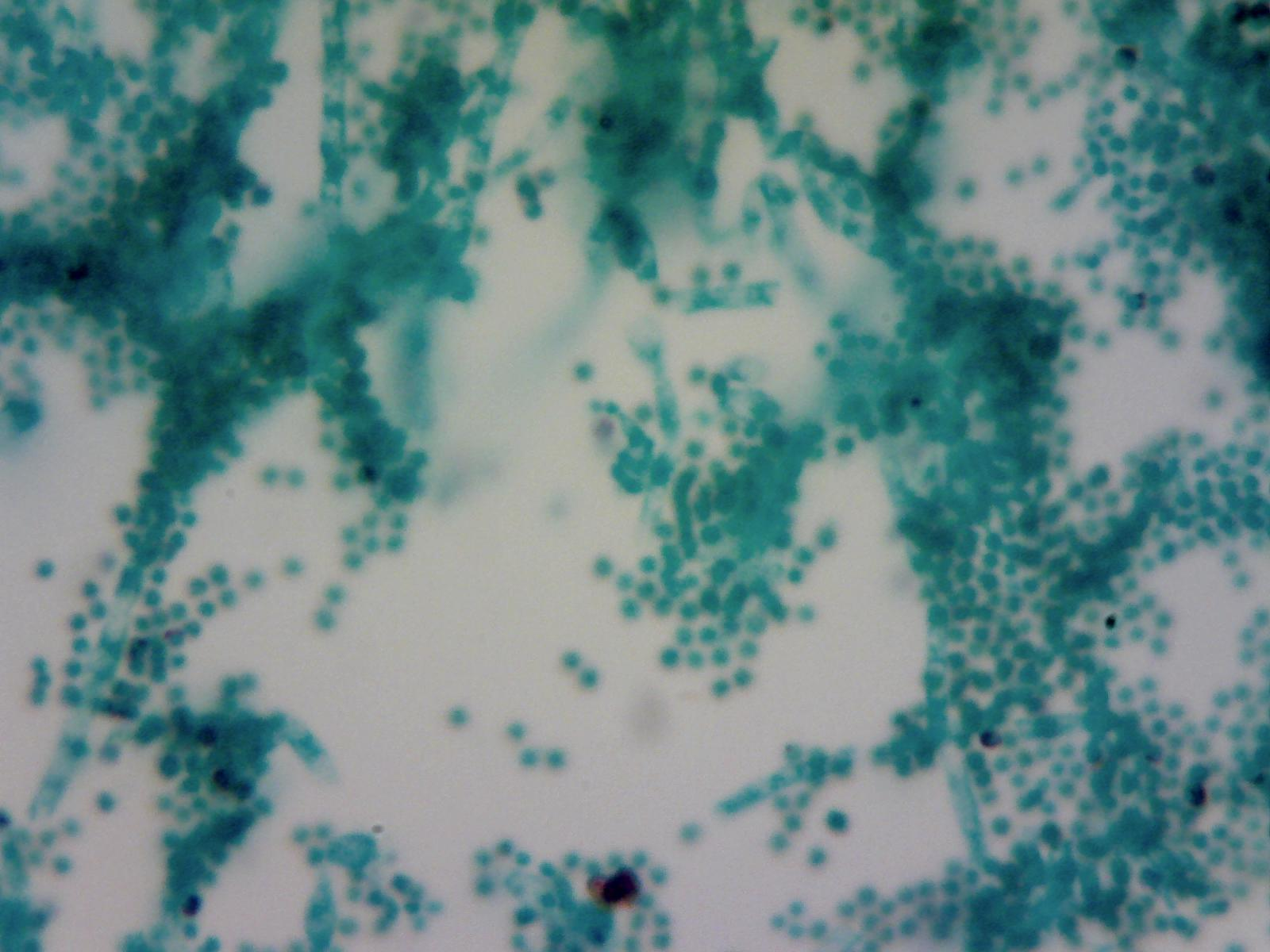
Penicillium spores

Certain molds have been found to alter the flavor of the ham, the most predominant were the members of the genera Penicillium and Aspergillus, Eight species of Aspergillus were found including A. fumigates which account for more than one third of all Aspergillus, and four species of Penicillium were discovered.

Three main yeast genera were found, Saccharomyces, Schizosaccharomyces, and Hansenula.

== See also ==
- Anfu ham
- Jinhua ham
- Rugao ham
- List of hams
