= Ham =

Pork from a leg cut that has been preserved by wet or dry curing

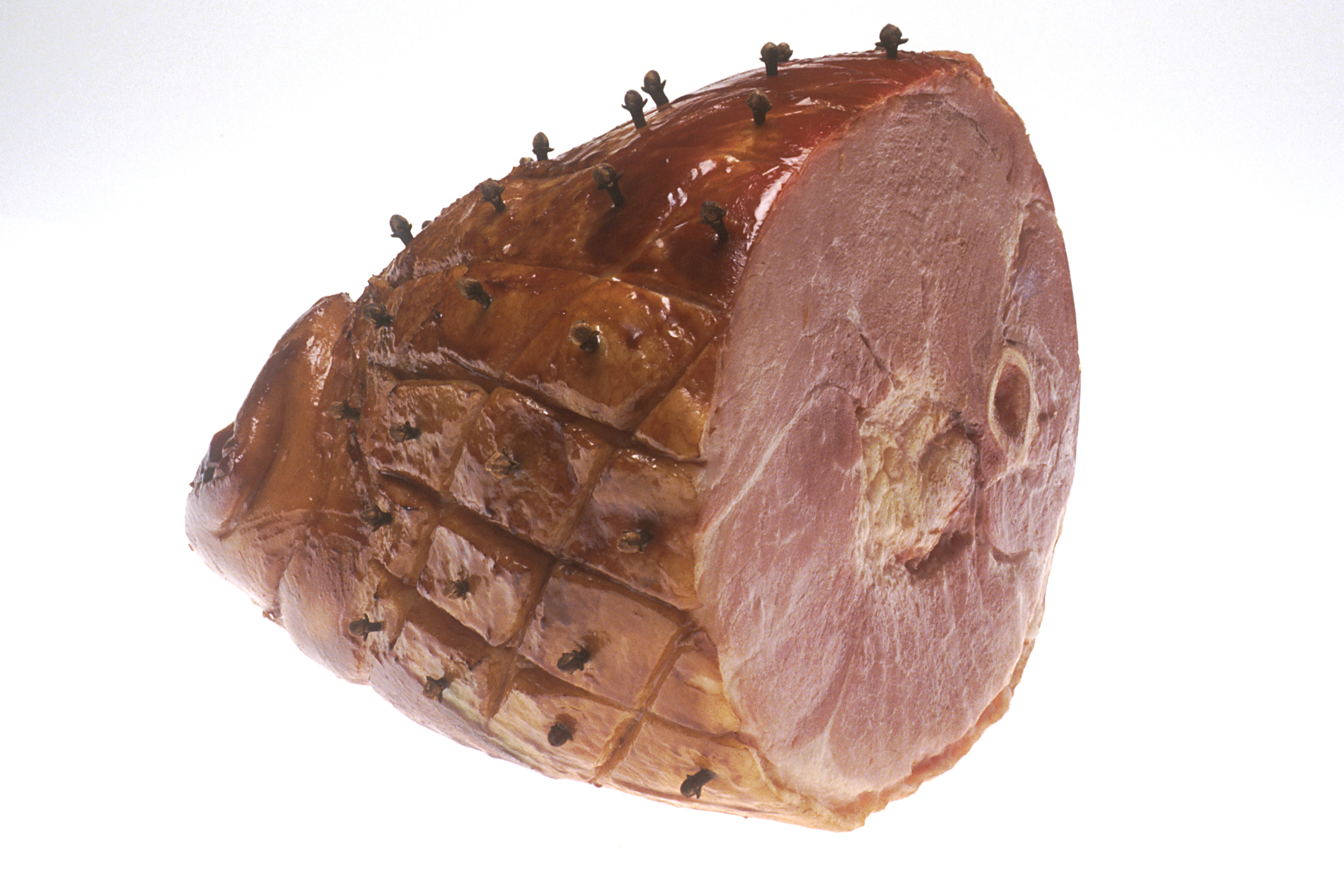
- Half of a bone-in ham, studded with cloves
- Type: Preserved meat
- Main ingredients: Cured leg cut pork

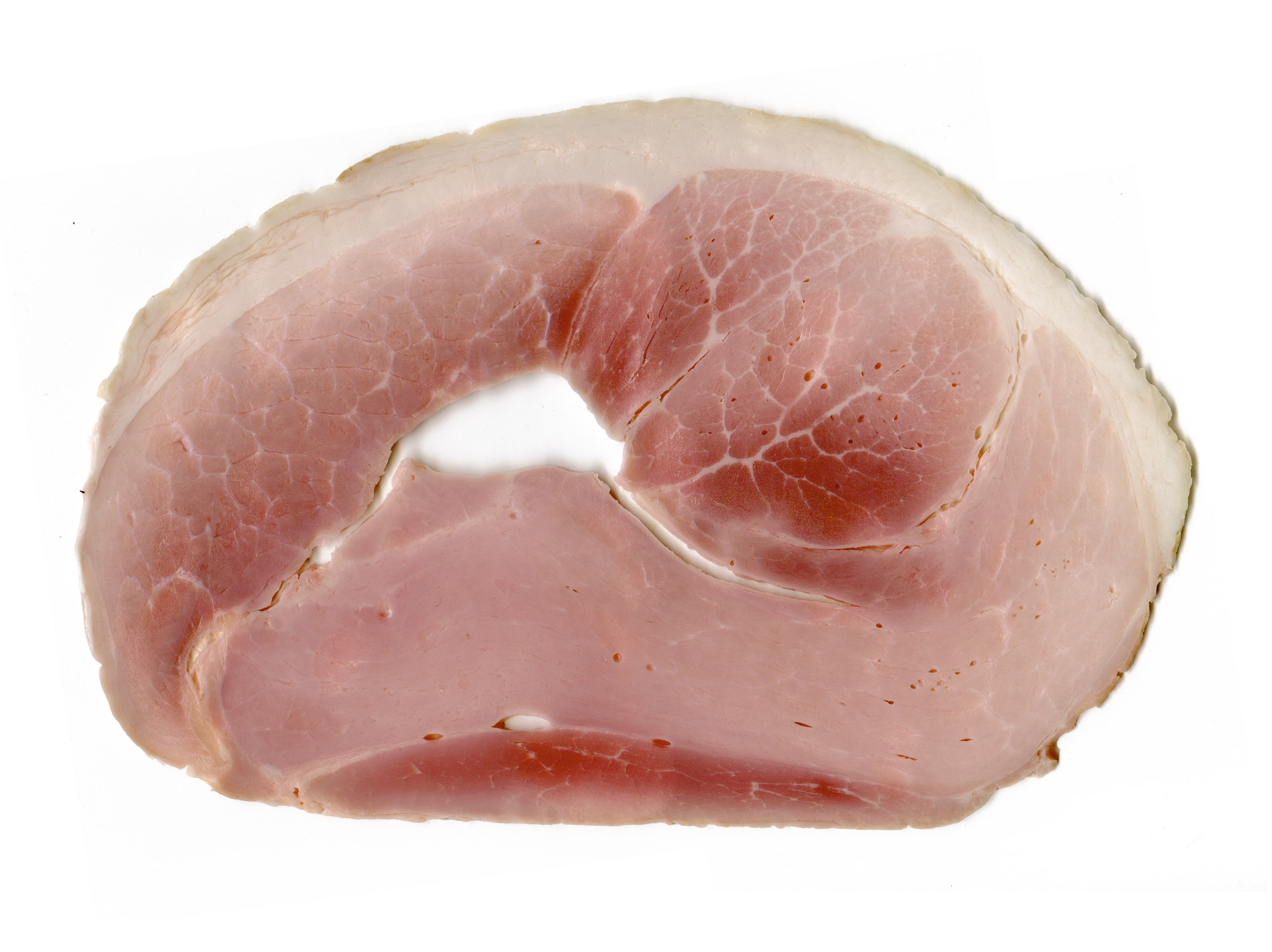
Typical slice of ham

Ham is pork from a leg cut that has been preserved by wet or dry curing, with or without smoking. As a processed meat, the term ham includes both whole cuts of meat and ones that have been mechanically formed.

Ham is made around the world, including a number of regional specialties. In addition, numerous ham products have specific geographical naming protection.

== History ==
The preserving of pork leg as ham has a long history, with traces of production of cured ham among the Etruscan civilisation known in the 6th and 5th century BC.

Cato the Elder wrote about the "salting of hams" in his De agri cultura tome around 160 BC.

There are claims that the Chinese were the first people to mention the production of cured ham. Larousse Gastronomique claims an origin from Gaul. It was certainly well established by the Roman period, as evidenced by an import trade from Gaul mentioned by Marcus Terentius Varro in his writings.

The modern word ham is derived from the Old English ham or hom meaning the hollow or bend of the knee, from a Germanic base where it meant 'crooked'. It began to refer to the cut of pork derived from the hind leg of a pig around the 15th century.

Because of the preservation process, ham is a compound foodstuff or ingredient, being made up of the original meat, as well as the remnants of the preserving agent(s), such as salt, but it is still recognised as a food in its own right.

== Methods ==
Ham is produced by curing raw pork by salting, also known as dry curing, or brining, also known as wet curing. Additionally, smoking may be employed, and seasonings may be added.

=== Dry-cured ===
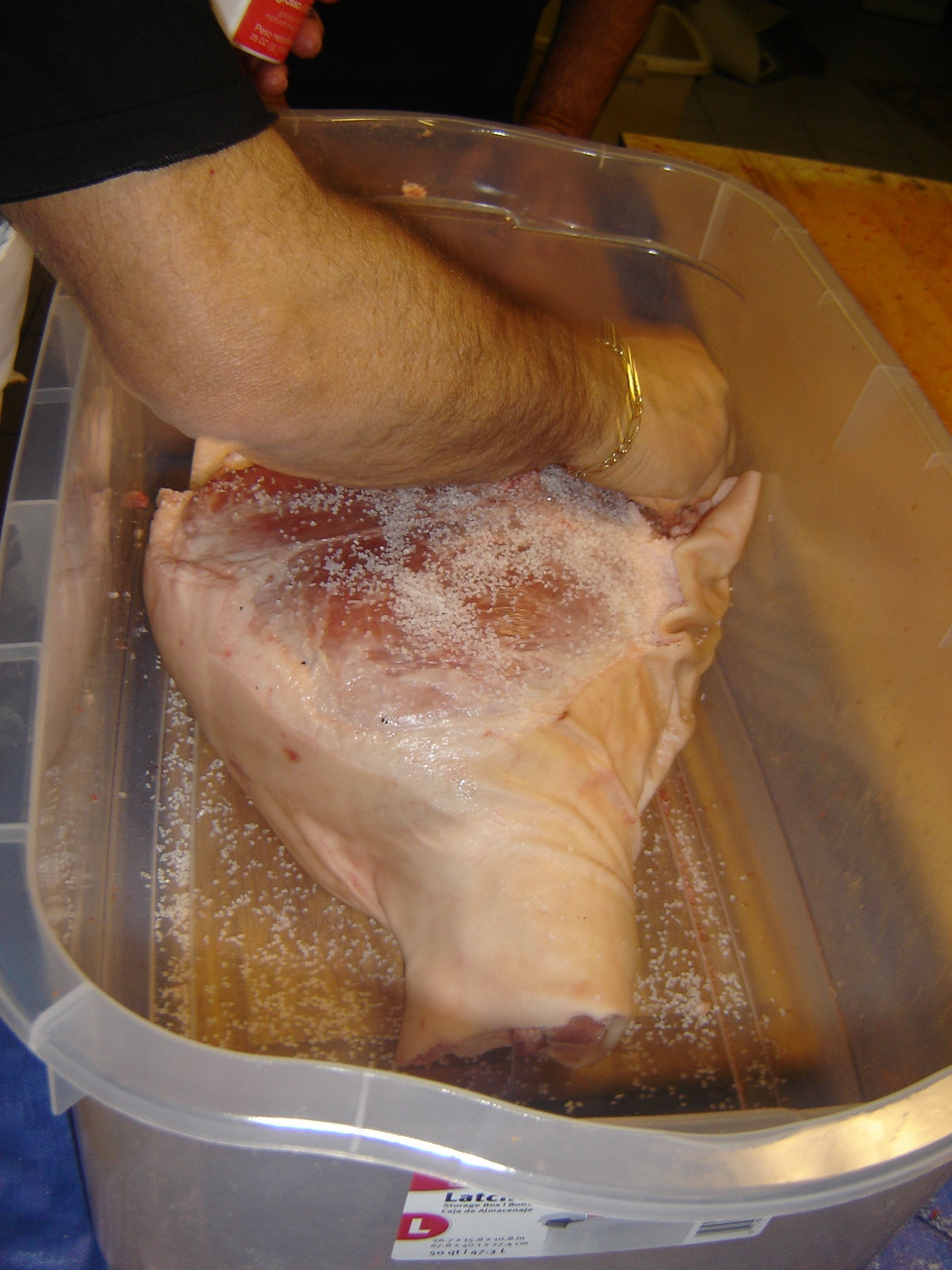
Sea salt being added to raw pork leg as part of a dry cure process

Traditional dry cure hams may use only salt as the curative agent, although this is comparatively rare. This process involves cleaning the raw meat, covering it in salt while it is gradually pressed to squeeze out fluid. Specific herbs and spices may be used to add flavour during this step. The hams are then washed and hung in a dark, temperature-regulated place until dry. It is then hung to air for another period of time.

The duration of the curing process varies by the type of ham. For example, Jinhua ham takes approximately 8 to 10 months to complete, jamón serrano cures in 9–12 months, prosciutto di Parma takes more than 12 months, and Iberian ham can take up to 2 years to reach the desired flavour characteristics. Many dry-cured hams, such as prosciutto, are eaten without being cooked.

Most modern dry cure hams also use nitrites (either sodium nitrite or potassium nitrite), which are added along with the salt. Nitrites are used because they prevent bacterial growth and, in a reaction with the meat's myoglobin, give the product a desirable dark red colour. The amount and mixture of salt and nitrites used have an effect on the shrinkage of the meat. Because of the toxicity of nitrite, some areas specify a maximum allowable content of nitrite in the final product. Under certain conditions, especially during cooking, nitrites in meat can react with degradation products of amino acids, forming nitrosamines, which are known carcinogens.

The dry curing of ham involves a number of enzymatic reactions. The enzymes involved are proteinases (cathepsins—B, D, H & L, and calpains) and exopeptidases (peptidase and aminopeptidase). These enzymes cause proteolysis of muscle tissue, which creates large numbers of small peptides and free amino acids, while the adipose tissue undergoes lipolysis to create free fatty acids. Salt and phosphates act as strong inhibitors of proteolytic activity. Animal factors influencing enzymatic activity include age, weight, and breed. During the process itself, conditions such as temperature, duration, water content, redox potential, and salt content all have an effect on the meat.

The salt content in dry-cured ham varies throughout a piece of meat, with gradients determinable through sampling and testing or non-invasively through CT scanning.

=== Wet-cured ===
Wet-cured hams are brined, which involves the immersion of the meat in a brine, sometimes with other ingredients such as sugar also added for flavour. The meat is typically kept in the brine for around 3 to 14 days. Wet curing also has the effect of increasing volume and weight of the finished product, by about 4%.

The wet curing process can also be achieved by pumping the curing solution into the meat. This can be quicker, increase the weight of the finished product by more than immersion, and ensure a more even distribution of salt through the meat. This process is quicker than traditional brining, normally being completed in a few days.

Wet-cured ham is usually cooked, either during processing, or after ageing. A typical example of wet-cured ham made this way is Italian prosciutto cotto. It is first brined, then cooked in a container and finally surface pasteurised. Italian regulations allow it to contain salt, nitrites, sugar, dextrose, fructose, lactose, maltodextrin, milk protein, soy protein, natural or modified starches, spices, gelatine, and flavourings.

=== Smoking ===
Ham can also be additionally preserved through smoking, in which the meat is placed in a smokehouse (or equivalent) to be cured by the action of smoke.

The main flavour compounds of smoked ham are guaiacol, and its 4-, 5-, and 6-methyl derivatives as well as 2,6-dimethylphenol. These compounds are produced by combustion of lignin, a major constituent of wood used in the smokehouse.

== Labeling ==
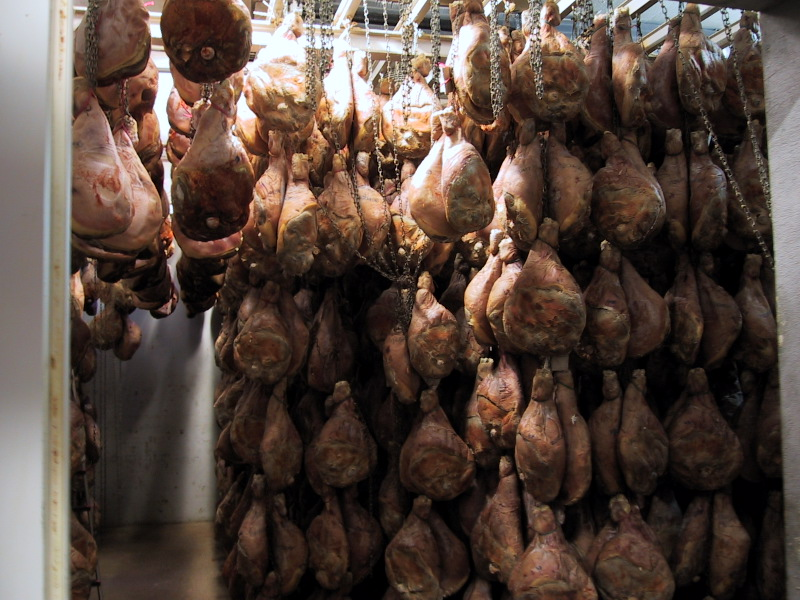
Hams aging in an atmospherically controlled storage room in Mazerolles, Béarn, Pyrénées-Atlantiques

In many countries the term is now protected by statute, with a specific definition. For instance, in the United States, the Code of Federal Regulations (CFR) says that "the word 'ham', without any prefix indicating the species of animal from which derived, shall be used in labelling only in connection with the hind legs of swine".

In addition to the main categories, some processing choices can affect legal labelling. For instance, in the United States, a "smoked" ham must have been smoked by hanging over burning wood chips in a smokehouse or an atomised spray of liquid smoke such that the product appearance is equivalent; a "hickory-smoked" ham must have been smoked using only hickory. However, injecting "smoke flavour" is not legal grounds for claiming the ham was "smoked"; these are labeled "smoke flavour added". Hams can only be labeled "honey-cured" if honey was at least 50% of the sweetener used, is at least 3% of the formula, and has a discernible effect on flavour. So-called "lean" and "extra lean" hams must adhere to maximum levels of fat and cholesterol per 100 grams of product.

=== Protected designations ===
A number of hams worldwide have some level of protection of their unique characteristics, usually relating to their method of preservation or location of production or processing. Dependent on jurisdiction, rules may prevent any other product being sold with the particular appellation, such as through the European protected geographical indication.

Belgium

- Jambon d'Ardenne – Wallonia

Bulgaria

- Elenski but – Elena

China

- Anfu ham- Jiangxi
- Jinhua ham – Jinhua
- Rugao ham – Rugao
- Xuanwei ham – Xuanwei

Czech Republic

- Pražká Šunka ("Prague Ham") – Prague

Croatia

- Pršut

France

- Jambon noir de Bigorre (PDO), made from black gascon pigs
- Jambon de kintoa (PDO), made from basque pigs
- Jambon de Corse (PDO), made from black nustrale pigs
- Jambon de Bayonne (PGI)
- Jambon d'Auvergne (PGI)
- Jambon de l'Ardèche (PGI)
- Jambon de Lacaune (PGI)
- Jambon de Vendée (PGI)
- Jambon sec des Ardennes (PGI)
- Jambon de Luxeuil
- Jambon du Limousin, made from black cul-noir pigs
- Jambon de Savoie
- Jambon du Périgord
- Jambon des Pyrénées

Germany

- Ammerländer Schinken – Ammerland
- Schwarzwälder Schinken – Black Forest
- Westfälischer Schinken – Westphalia

Italy

- Prosciutto di Parma – Parma
- Prosciutto di San Daniele – San Daniele del Friuli
- Speck Alto Adige – South Tyrol
- Valle d'Aosta Jambon de Bosses – Saint-Rhémy-en-Bosses, Aosta Valley

Luxembourg

- Éisleker ham – Oesling region

Montenegro

- Njeguška pršuta – Njeguši, Montenegro

Portugal

- Portuguese Fiambre (not to be confused with Guatemalan fiambre)
- Presunto
- Jamón Ibérico

Slovenia

- Kraški pršut

Spain

- Jamón serrano
- Jamón Ibérico, made from the Black Iberian pig breeds
- Lacón Gallego, from Galicia

United Kingdom

- Carmarthen Ham
- New Forest Pannage Ham

United States

- Smithfield ham – Smithfield, Virginia

== Uses ==
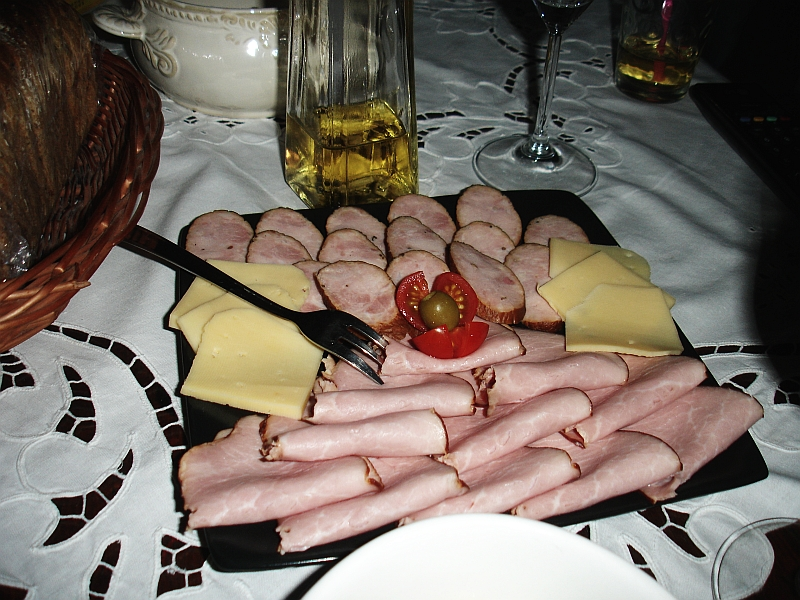
A platter of ham and cheese sliced for sandwiches

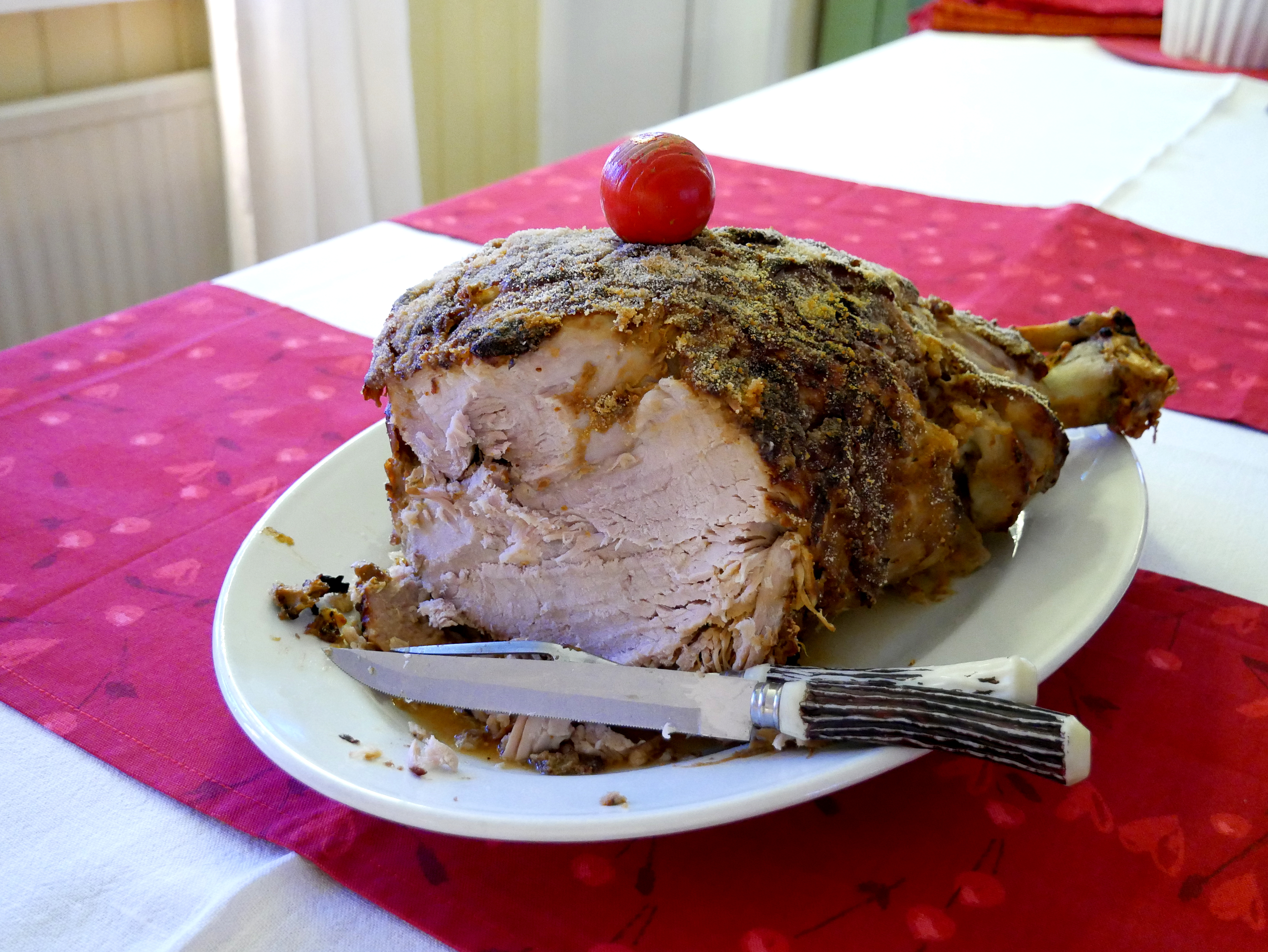
A Finnish Christmas ham

Ham is typically used in its sliced form, often as a filling for sandwiches and similar foods, such as in the ham sandwich and ham and cheese sandwich. Other variations include toasted sandwiches such as the croque-monsieur and the Cubano. It is also a popular topping for pizza in the United States.

In the United Kingdom, a pork leg cut, either whole or sliced, that has been cured but requires additional cooking is known as gammon. Gammons were traditionally cured before being cut from a side of pork along with bacon. When cooked, gammon is ham. Cooked ham joints are a popular dish around Christmas time, particularly in the Anglosphere and Northern Europe. Gammon can also served as gammon steaks, which are fried or grilled, and served in a similar manner to bacon.

== Nutrition and health effects ==
Ham is a type of processed red meat. According to the International Agency for Research on Cancer (IARC), processed meat causes cancer, particularly colorectal cancer. Strong evidence also links processed meat with higher risks of cardiovascular disease and type 2 diabetes. The World Cancer Research Fund recommends minimizing consumption of processed meats.

== See also ==
- List of hams
- List of ham dishes
- List of smoked foods
- Christmas ham
- Ham and eggs
- Prosciutto
- Spam (food)
- Turkey ham
