= Xianning Nuclear Power Plant =

Planned nuclear power plant in Hubei Province, China

- Country: People's Republic of China
- Location: Dafan Town, Tongshan County, Xianning, Hubei
- Coordinates: 29.6776°N 114.6842°E
- Status: Under construction
- Construction began: 2010
- Owner: Hubei Nuclear Power Co.

Nuclear power station
- Reactor type: CAP1000

Power generation
- Units planned: 2 × 1250 MW

The Xianning Nuclear Power Plant (Chinese: 咸宁核电站), also named Dafan Nuclear Power Plant (大畈核电站), is planned in Dafan Town, Tongshan County, Xianning, Hubei Province, China. It is planned to host at least four 1,250-megawatt (MW) AP1000 pressurized water reactors.

The plant is owned by Hubei Nuclear Power Company, a joint venture of China Guangdong Nuclear Power Group (CGNPC) and Hubei Energy Group Ltd. The cost of four AP1000 reactors is put at CNY 60 billion (US$8.8 billion). Work on the site began in 2010; the first reactor was planned to start construction in 2011 and go online in 2015. While the project is still listed as "planned", construction of the first phase has yet to start as of 2023.

== Reactors ==
Unit	Type	Construction start	Operation start	Notes
Xianning 1	CAP1000			
Xianning 2	CAP1000			

The plant is described as the first nuclear power plant to be built in China's inland regions (i.e., not near the sea coast). The plant is expected to use the water of the Fushui Reservoir for cooling and various ancillary purposes.

The station's four cooling towers, some of the largest in the world, will have the base diameter of 169 metres (554 ft) and the height of 209 metres (686 ft).

== Transportation access ==
There are no railways or navigable waterways within the station's vicinity. (The Fushui River is not navigable.) In order to facilitate the delivery of heavy equipment (such as the reactor pressure vessels or electric generators) to the construction site, a major highway construction and upgrade project is being undertaken. The so-called Xianning Nuclear Plant Site Large Equipment Transport Road (咸宁核电厂大件运输公路) will connect the station's construction site with the Panjiawan Harbor (潘家湾港) on the Yangtze River in Jiayu County. The road, which will include sections of existing roadways as well as newly constructed sections, will be 102.1 kilometres (63.4 mi) long. The road will include a newly constructed 366-metre (1,201 ft) long, 9-metre (30 ft) wide overpass over the Beijing–Guangzhou Railway, designed to carry loads of up to 930 tons.

== See also ==
- Nuclear power in China
