= Luoxiao Mountains =

Mountain range in China

Luoxiao Range
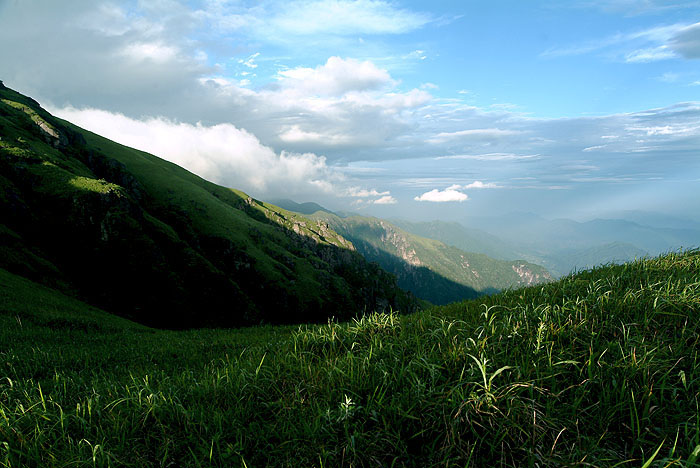
- View of the Wugong Range, a subrange of the Luoxiao Mountains

Highest point
- Elevation: 2,120 m (6,960 ft)
- Coordinates: 28°46′N 114°52′E

Naming
- Native name: 罗霄山脉 / 羅霄山脈 (Chinese)

Geography
- Location within Eastern China Location within China
- Location: Jiangxi, Hubei and Hunan, China

The Luoxiao Mountains (simplified Chinese: 罗霄山脉; traditional Chinese: 羅霄山脈; pinyin: Luóxiāo Shānmài) are a system of mountain ranges in the People's Republic of China that straddle Jiangxi, Hubei, and Hunan provinces.

== Subranges ==
Among other smaller ranges, the Luoxiao Mountains include the following subranges:

- Wugong Mountains (Wu-Kung)
- Jinggang Mountains
- Jiugong Mountains
- Jiuling Mountains
- Mufu Mountains
