= Tongshan County =

Tongshan County 通山县 Tungshan
- County
- Location of the seat in Hubei
- Coordinates (Tongshan government): 29°36′23″N 114°28′58″E
- Country: People's Republic of China
- Province: Hubei
- Prefecture-level city: Xianning

Area
  - Total: 2,413 km^{2} (932 sq mi)

Population (2020 census)
  - Total: 391,311
  - Density: 162.2/km^{2} (420.0/sq mi)
- Time zone: UTC+8 (China Standard)
- Website: www.tongshan.gov.cn

Tongshan (simplified Chinese: 通山县; traditional Chinese: 通山縣; pinyin: Tōngshān Xiàn) is a county of Xianning City, in the southeastern part of Hubei province, People's Republic of China, bordering Jiangxi to the south.

The county is located along Hubei's mountainous south-eastern border with Jiangxi. Its best known tourist attraction is the Jiugong Mountain National Park (九宫山风景区), located in the Jiugong Range, south of Jiugongshan Town.

The county is roughly coterminous with the upper part of the basin of the Fushui River, which flows eastward, into the neighboring Yangxin County, where it discharges into the Yangtze. A fairly large Fushui Reservoir (Fushui Shuiku) is formed on this river and its tributaries within Tongshan County by a dam that's actually built in Yangxin County, a bit downstream of the county line. The Fushui's tributaries also include a few minor reservoirs.

The county seat is in the town of Tongyang (通羊镇); as it is customary in China, this location is usually labeled on less-detailed maps simply as "Tongshan County" (通山县) or "Tongshan".

The county is served by China National Highway 106 (G106), which joins with G316 near the eastern tip of the county.

Xianning Nuclear Power Plant is under construction near Tongshan County's Dafan Town.

== Administrative divisions ==
The county is divided into 8 towns, 4 townships and 1 other area:

- Towns (镇): Tongyang (通羊镇, the county seat), Nanlinqiao (南林桥镇), Huangshapu (黄沙铺镇), Xiapu (厦铺镇), Chuangwang (闯王镇), Honggang (洪港镇), Dafan (大畈镇), Jiugong Shan (九宫山镇).
- Townships (乡): Dalu (大路乡), Yangfanglin (杨芳林乡), Cikou (慈口乡), Yanxia (Yansha?) (燕厦乡).
- Other area: Jiugongshan Tourism District Management Committee (九宫山名胜风景区管委会)
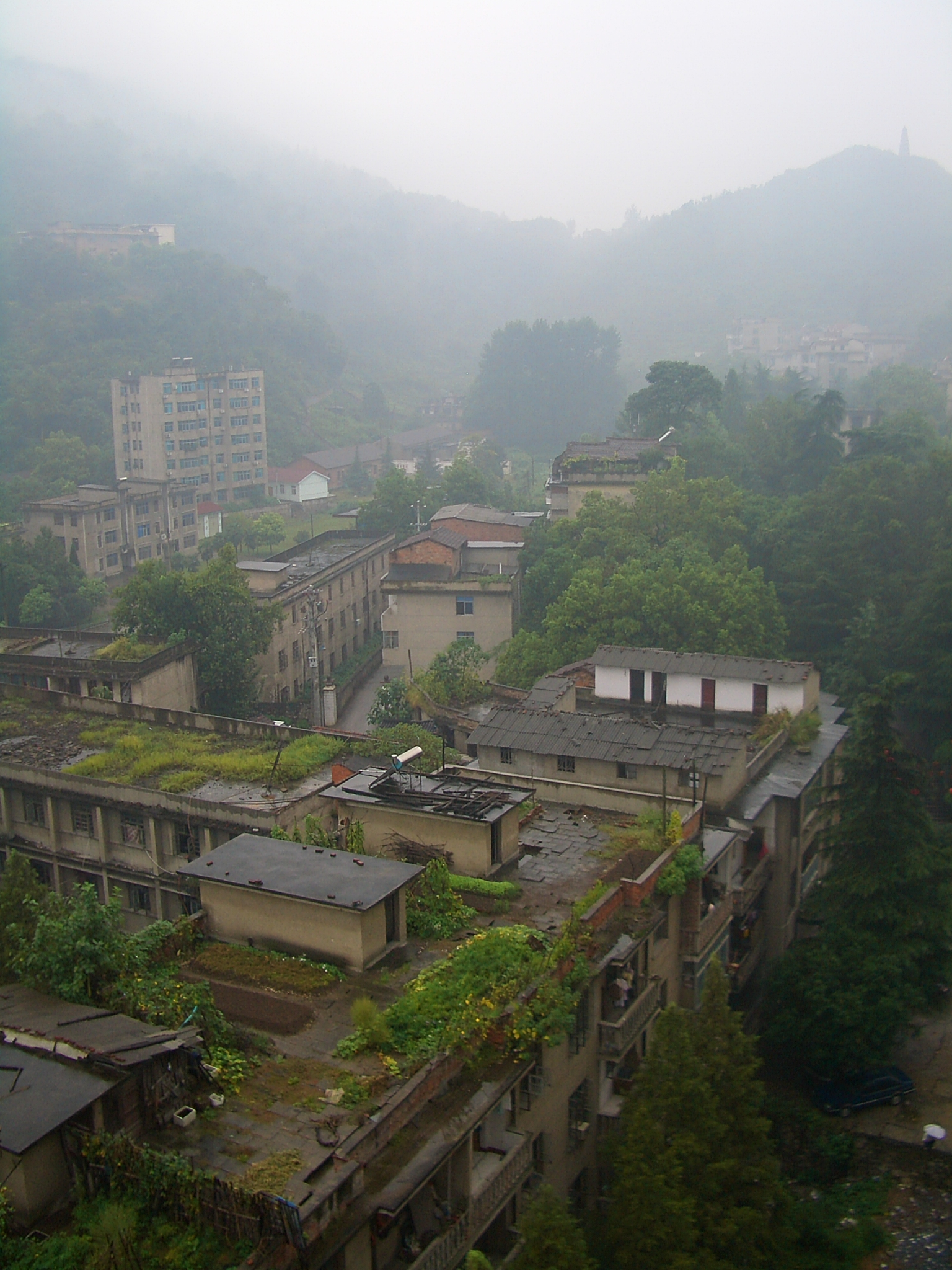
An apartment complex in Tongyang. Note the creative use of roofs for vegetable gardens

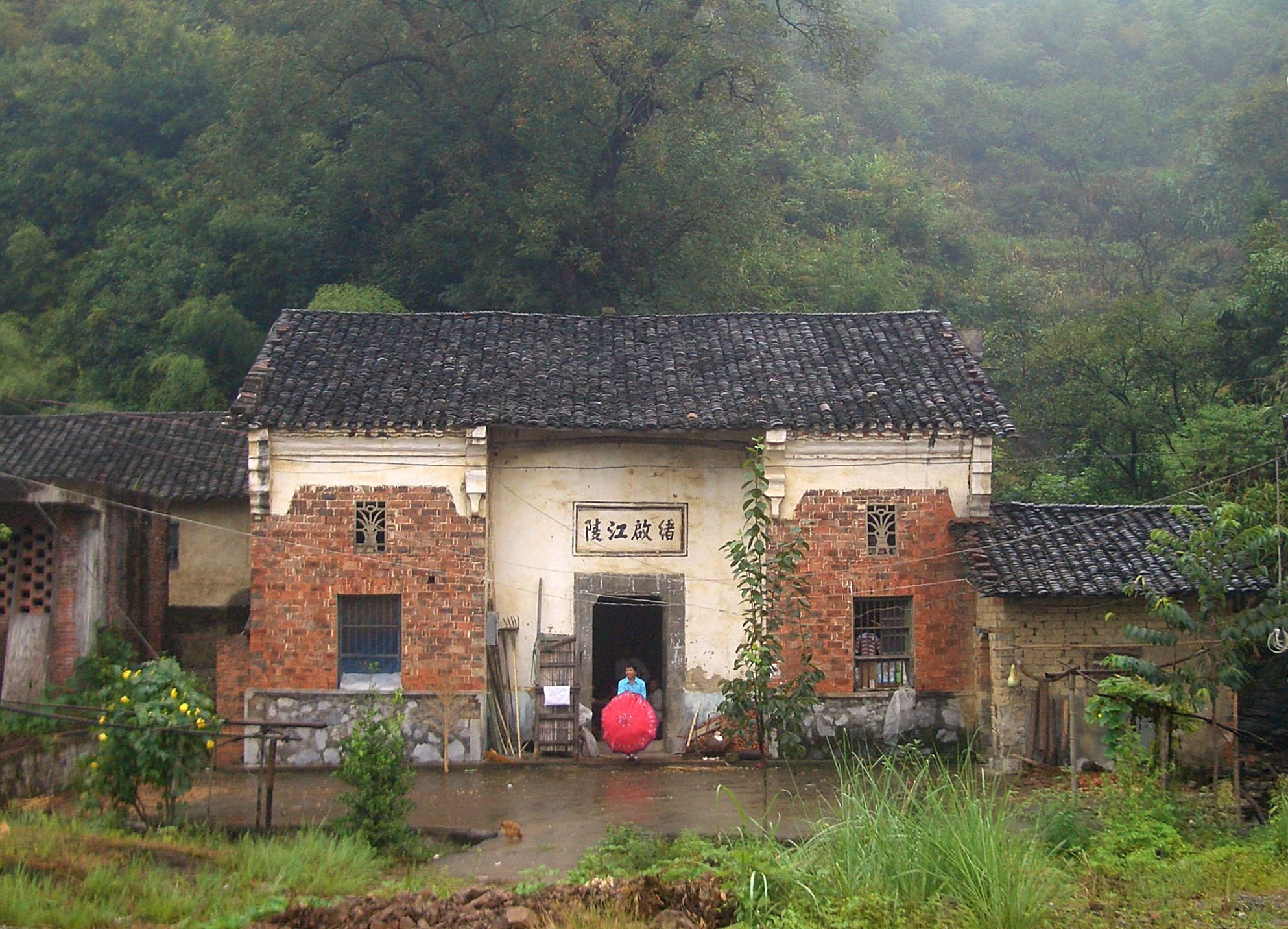
A typical old village home

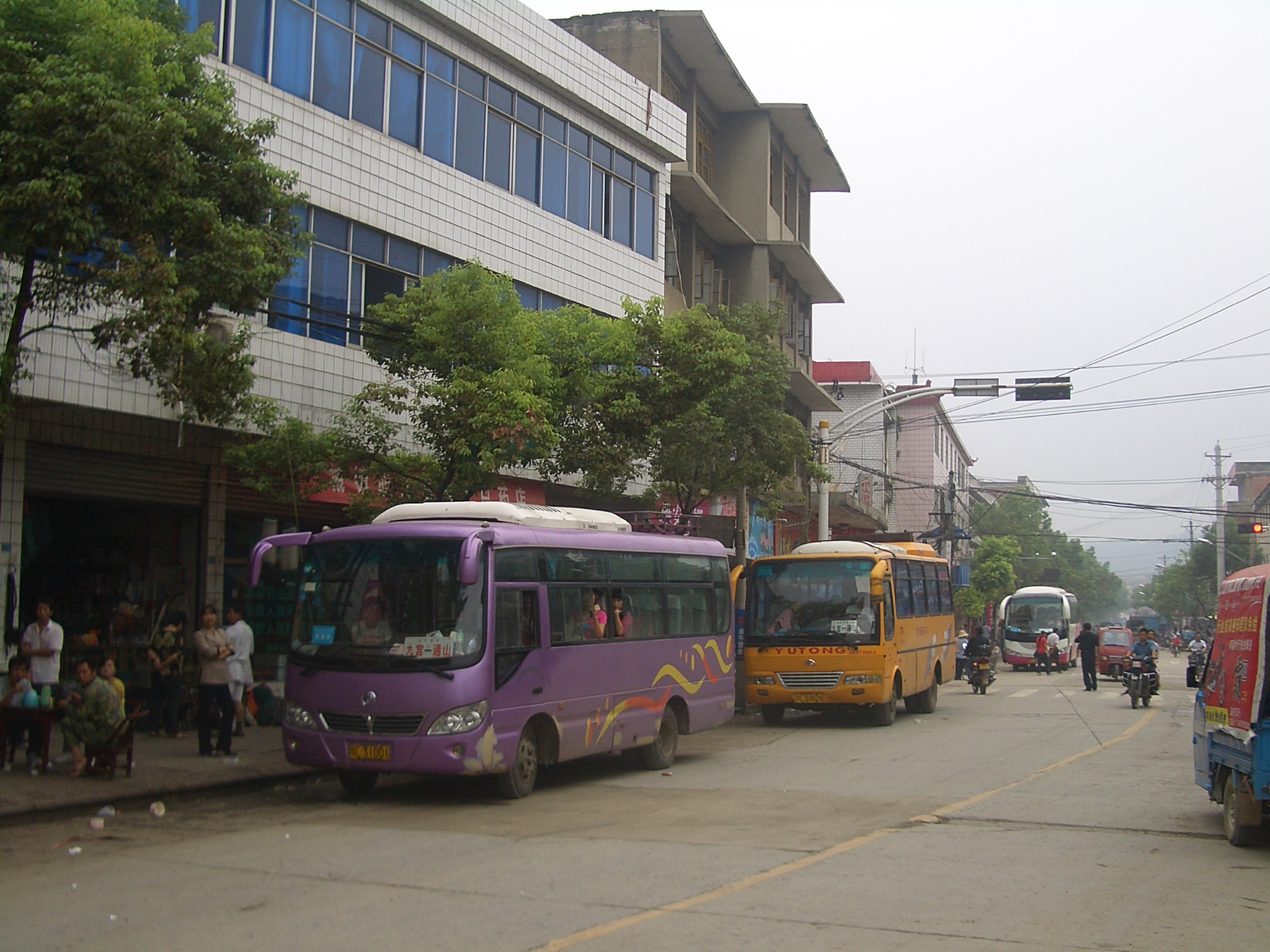
County's local buses in Hengshitan (Jiugongshan Town)

== Climate ==
Climate data for Tongshan, elevation 100 m (330 ft), (1991–2020 normals, extremes 1991–present)
Month	Jan	Feb	Mar	Apr	May	Jun	Jul	Aug	Sep	Oct	Nov	Dec	Year
Record high °C (°F)	25.9 (78.6)	30.0 (86.0)	35.2 (95.4)	35.9 (96.6)	38.4 (101.1)	39.0 (102.2)	40.9 (105.6)	41.5 (106.7)	40.7 (105.3)	38.2 (100.8)	32.9 (91.2)	24.3 (75.7)	41.5 (106.7)
Mean daily maximum °C (°F)	9.3 (48.7)	12.4 (54.3)	17.0 (62.6)	23.5 (74.3)	28.0 (82.4)	30.7 (87.3)	34.2 (93.6)	33.6 (92.5)	29.5 (85.1)	24.1 (75.4)	18.2 (64.8)	12.2 (54.0)	22.7 (72.9)
Daily mean °C (°F)	4.8 (40.6)	7.4 (45.3)	11.6 (52.9)	17.7 (63.9)	22.4 (72.3)	25.8 (78.4)	28.9 (84.0)	28.1 (82.6)	24.2 (75.6)	18.5 (65.3)	12.4 (54.3)	6.8 (44.2)	17.4 (63.3)
Mean daily minimum °C (°F)	1.7 (35.1)	4.0 (39.2)	7.8 (46.0)	13.4 (56.1)	18.3 (64.9)	22.2 (72.0)	25.1 (77.2)	24.5 (76.1)	20.4 (68.7)	14.5 (58.1)	8.5 (47.3)	3.2 (37.8)	13.6 (56.5)
Record low °C (°F)	−7.5 (18.5)	−6.3 (20.7)	−2.5 (27.5)	1.0 (33.8)	9.3 (48.7)	16.0 (60.8)	18.4 (65.1)	17.6 (63.7)	9.6 (49.3)	2.5 (36.5)	−2.6 (27.3)	−10.8 (12.6)	−10.8 (12.6)
Average precipitation mm (inches)	73.1 (2.88)	86.5 (3.41)	139.8 (5.50)	189.9 (7.48)	208.3 (8.20)	248.5 (9.78)	239.0 (9.41)	144.4 (5.69)	92.7 (3.65)	70.7 (2.78)	73.5 (2.89)	47.1 (1.85)	1,613.5 (63.52)
Average precipitation days (≥ 0.1 mm)	12.3	12.5	15.3	14.7	14.5	15.0	13.6	13.2	9.6	9.8	10.2	9.2	149.9
Average snowy days	4.4	2.6	0.6	0	0	0	0	0	0	0	0.2	1.5	9.3
Average relative humidity (%)	77	76	77	75	76	79	77	78	77	76	76	74	77
Mean monthly sunshine hours	85.8	88.1	110.8	137.4	157.8	150.6	212.7	201.2	162.0	147.6	125.7	115.7	1,695.4
Percentage possible sunshine	26	28	30	35	37	36	50	50	44	42	40	36	38
Source: China Meteorological Administration
