= Taishan Township, Jiangxi =

Taishan Township 泰山乡
- Township
- Location in Jiangxi Taishan Township (China)
- Coordinates: 27°26′40″N 114°16′19″E
- Country: People's Republic of China
- Province: Jiangxi
- Prefecture-level city: Ji'an
- County-level city: Anfu County
- Time zone: UTC+8 (China Standard)

Taishan Township (simplified Chinese: 泰山乡; traditional Chinese: 泰山鄉; pinyin: Tàishān Xiāng) is a township under the administration of Anfu County, Jiangxi, China. As of 2018, it has one residential community and 7 villages under its administration.

== See also ==
- List of township-level divisions of Jiangxi
