= Wugong Mountains =

Mountain range in China

Wugong Range 武功山
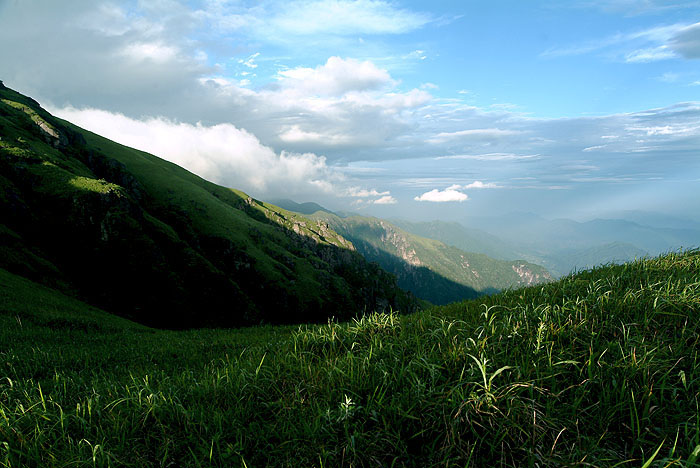
- View of a ridge of the Wugong Range

Highest point
- Elevation: 1,918.3 m (6,294 ft)
- Coordinates: 27°29′N 114°11′E

Geography
- Location within Eastern China Location within China
- Location: JiangxiPingXiang China
- Parent range: Luoxiao Mountains

The Wugongshan or Wu-kung Mountains (Chinese: 武功山), now a tourist resort, are a range of mountains located in the west of Jiangxi, China. It is the geography boundary of Anfu County, Luxi County, Jiangxi, Yichun, Jiangxi, and Lianhua County. Its highest point, the 1918.3-meter high Baihe Feng (Golden Peak) located in Anfu County.

== Description ==
The Wugongshan National Geological Park is located in the area of the range.

These mountains, mostly composed of granite, limestone, and gneiss, were isolated islands many millions years ago when the south of China (South China Craton) was a vast ocean. However, tectonic collision had induced regional uplift, making the ancient ocean disappear. These mountains are covered by fertile soil, together with abundant rainfall and moderated temperature, rendering this region full of vegetations and forests. Because the elevation of the some mountains rises more than 1,500 meters high, vertical vegetation distribution is very clear: subtropical forest forest at the piedmont and until the middle of the mountain covered by taiga forest regions, and 10,000 hectares of grass above 1,600 meters high. That makes them a unique resort in the southeast China.

The resort includes:

(1) The Golden Summit Scenic Area

(2) Fayunjie

(3) Yangshimu

and some others.

== Features ==
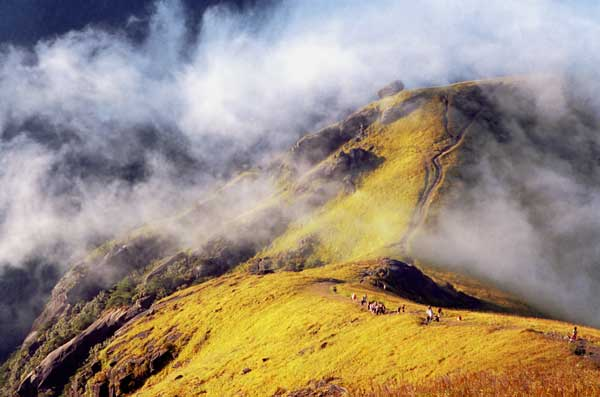
High altitude meadows

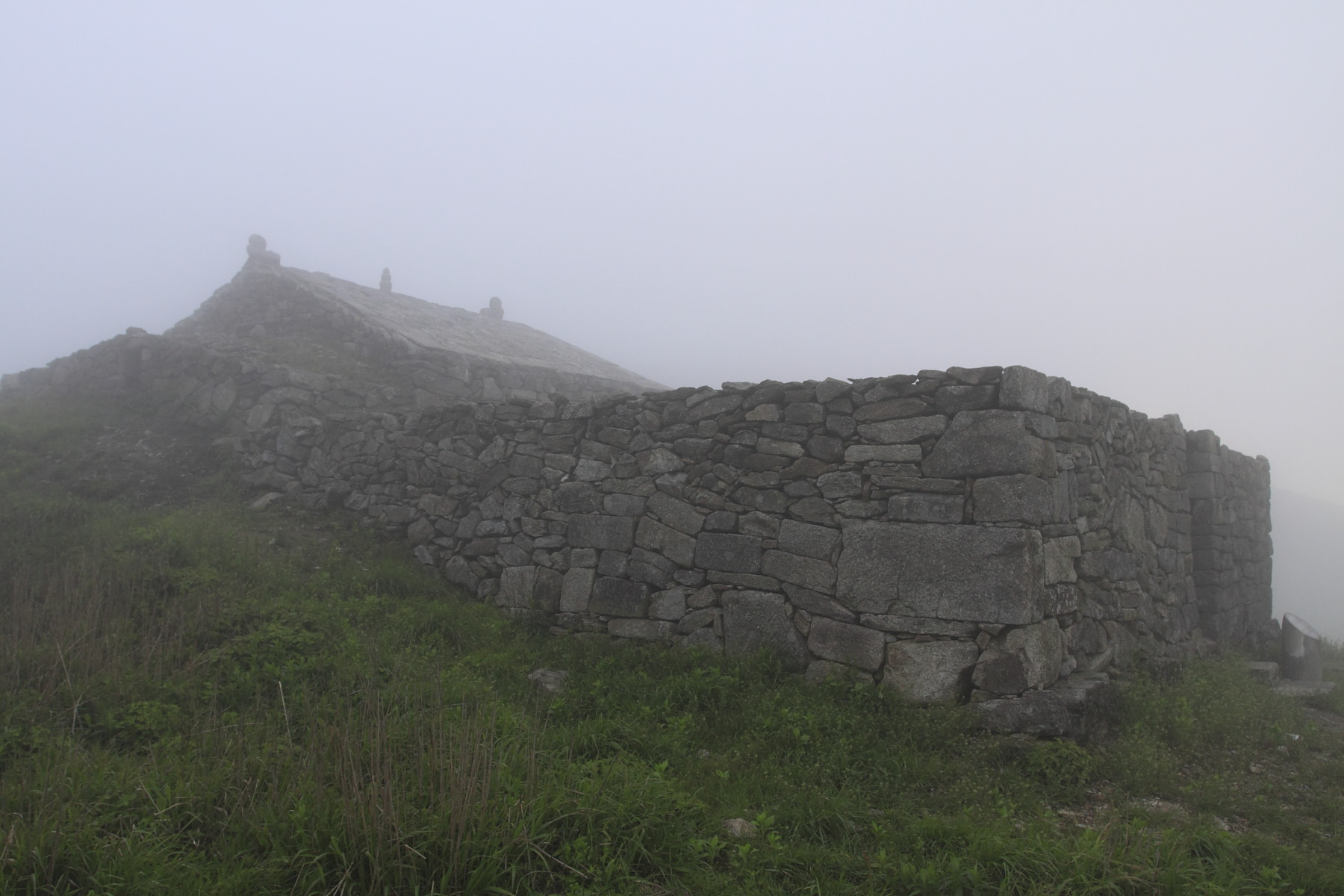
Wang Xian, located next to the altar of the golden dome.

== See also ==
- List of ultras of Tibet, East Asia and neighbouring areas
