= Anfu ham =

Type of ham from Anfu, China

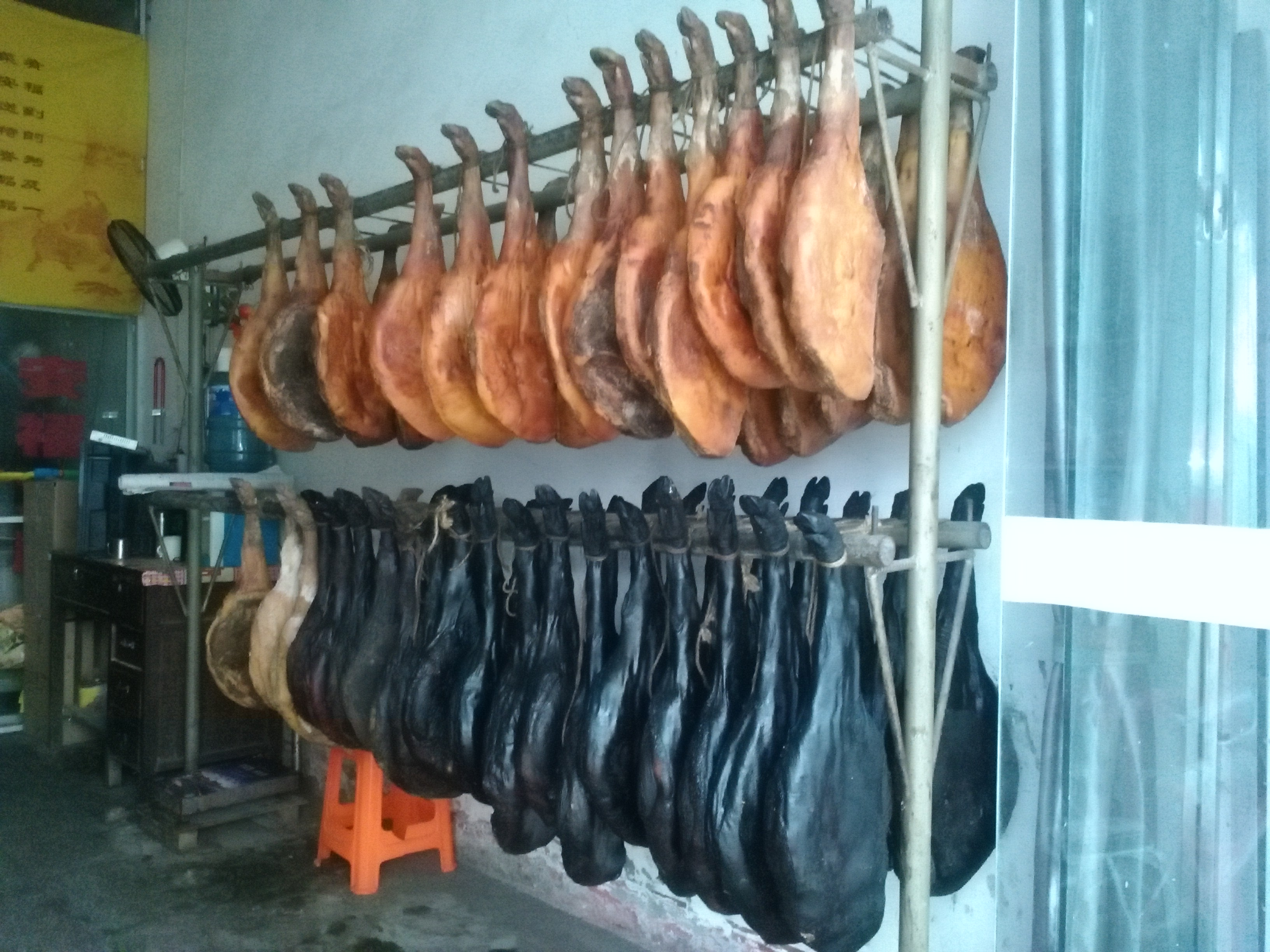
Anfu ham in Anfu County, Jiangxi province, China

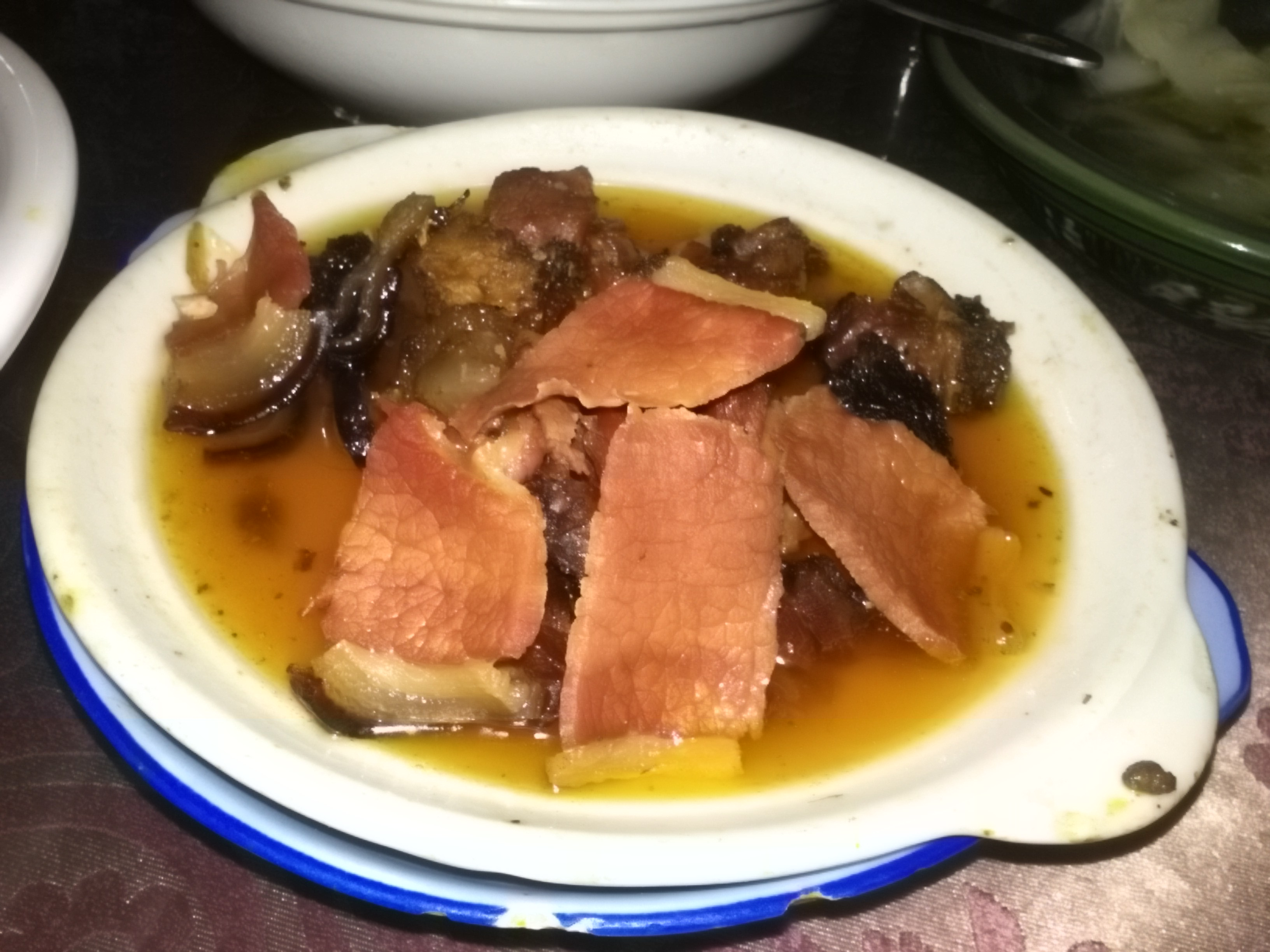
Cooked Anfu ham

Anfu ham (Chinese: 安福火腿; pinyin: Ānfú huǒtuǐ) is a type of dry-cured ham named after the town of Anfu in Jiangxi, China, where it originated. Red with a yellowish tint, the ham's skin is thin, but the meat itself is thick. The ham gets its flavor from being salted and smoked and can be eaten on its own or used to add flavor to dishes. It is made in Anfu and other locations.

In 1915, Anfu ham was featured in the Panama–Pacific International Exposition. Chinaculture.org, a project of the Ministry of Culture of the People's Republic of China and the China Daily, described its shape as being "like willow leaves". Anfu ham can remain edible for years.

== See also ==
- List of ancient dishes
- List of hams

Chinese hams

- Jinhua ham
- Rugao ham
- Xuanwei ham
