= Anfu County =

Anfu County 安福县
- County
- Location of Anfu County (red) within Ji'an City (gold) and Jiangxi
- Coordinates: 27°23′N 114°37′E
- Country: People's Republic of China
- Province: Jiangxi
- Prefecture-level city: Ji'an

Area
  - Total: 2,793.15 km^{2} (1,078.44 sq mi)

Population (2018)
  - Total: 421,000
  - Density: 151/km^{2} (390/sq mi)
- Time zone: UTC+8 (China Standard)
- Postal Code: 343200
- Website: www.afx.gov.cn

Anfu County (simplified Chinese: 安福县; traditional Chinese: 安福縣; pinyin: Ānfú Xiàn) is a county in the west of Jiangxi province, People's Republic of China. It is under the jurisdiction of the prefecture-level city of Ji'an.

Anfu is the home of noted Chinese lawyer Huang Rui (黄蕊) and the birthplace of political activist Xu Wenli.

== Administrative divisions ==
In the present, Anfu County has 6 towns, 4 townships and 1 ethnic township.

Towns:

- Pingdu (平都镇), Hukeng (浒坑镇), Zhouhu (洲湖镇), Henglong (横龙镇), Yangxi (洋溪镇), Yantian (严田镇), Fengtian (枫田镇)

Townships:

- Zhujiang Township (竹江乡), Guashe Township (瓜畲乡), Qianshan Township (钱山乡), Chigu Township (赤谷乡), Shanzhuang Township (山庄乡), Yangmen Township (洋门乡), Jintian Township (金田乡), Pengfang Township (彭坊乡), Taishan Township (泰山乡), Liaotang Township (寮塘乡), Ganluo Township (甘洛乡), Zhangzhuang Township (章庄乡)

== Demographics ==
The population of the district was 383,414 in 1999.

== Culture ==
=== Cuisine ===
Anfu ham is an ancient dry-cured ham that originated in Anfu County and dates to the Qin dynasty.

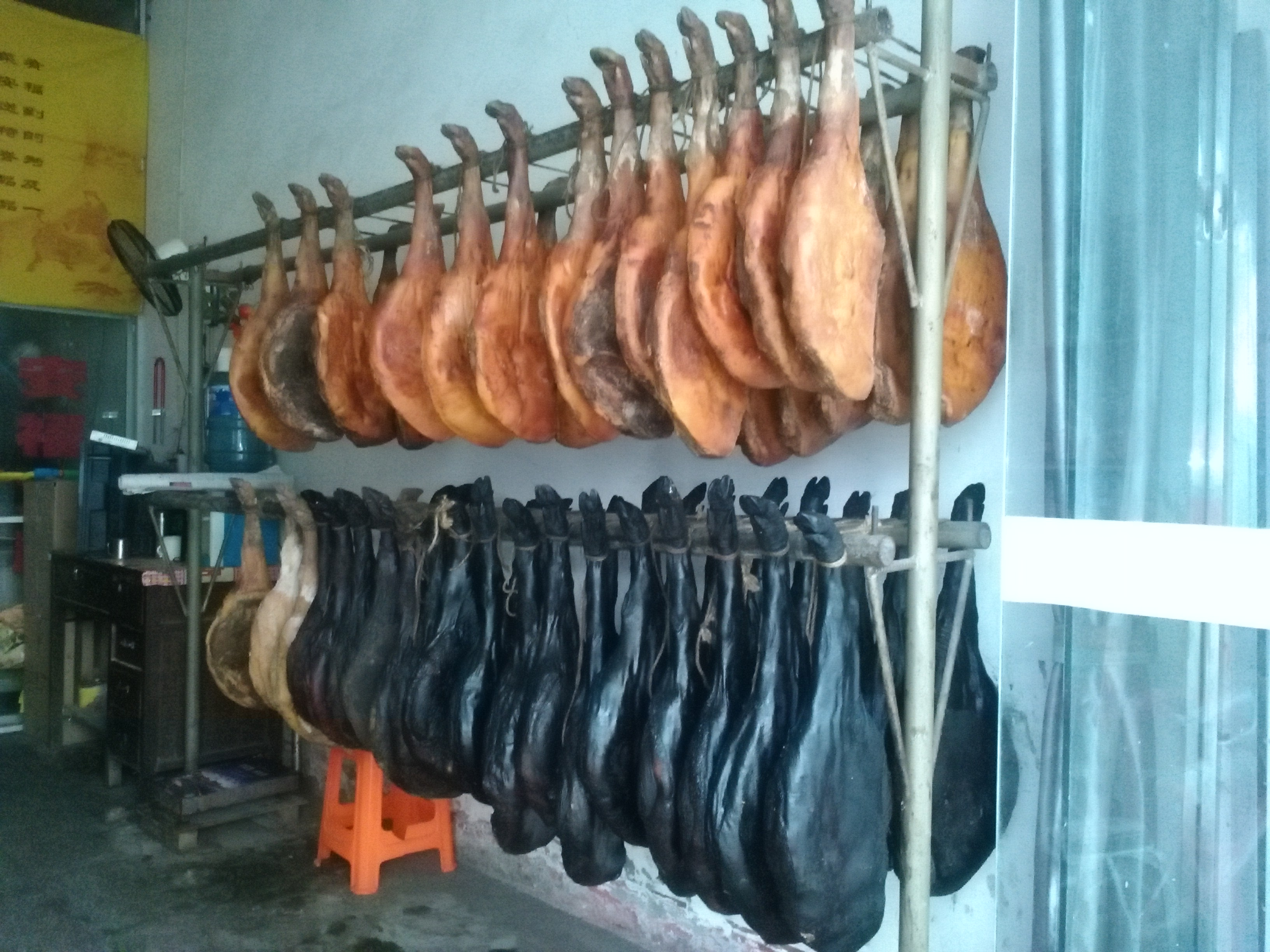
Anfu ham in Anfu County

== Climate ==
Climate data for Anfu, elevation 86 m (282 ft), (1991–2020 normals, extremes 1981–2010)
Month	Jan	Feb	Mar	Apr	May	Jun	Jul	Aug	Sep	Oct	Nov	Dec	Year
Record high °C (°F)	25.2 (77.4)	30.8 (87.4)	34.6 (94.3)	36.0 (96.8)	35.8 (96.4)	37.3 (99.1)	40.2 (104.4)	40.8 (105.4)	37.5 (99.5)	36.4 (97.5)	32.5 (90.5)	25.2 (77.4)	40.8 (105.4)
Mean daily maximum °C (°F)	10.5 (50.9)	13.4 (56.1)	17.0 (62.6)	23.5 (74.3)	27.8 (82.0)	30.6 (87.1)	34.1 (93.4)	33.6 (92.5)	30.1 (86.2)	25.4 (77.7)	19.4 (66.9)	13.4 (56.1)	23.2 (73.8)
Daily mean °C (°F)	6.6 (43.9)	9.0 (48.2)	12.5 (54.5)	18.4 (65.1)	22.9 (73.2)	26.0 (78.8)	28.8 (83.8)	28.2 (82.8)	24.8 (76.6)	19.8 (67.6)	14.0 (57.2)	8.4 (47.1)	18.3 (64.9)
Mean daily minimum °C (°F)	3.8 (38.8)	5.9 (42.6)	9.4 (48.9)	14.8 (58.6)	19.4 (66.9)	22.7 (72.9)	24.8 (76.6)	24.5 (76.1)	21.2 (70.2)	15.9 (60.6)	10.3 (50.5)	5.0 (41.0)	14.8 (58.6)
Record low °C (°F)	−7.2 (19.0)	−3.4 (25.9)	−1.8 (28.8)	1.4 (34.5)	9.7 (49.5)	13.8 (56.8)	17.4 (63.3)	19.0 (66.2)	12.2 (54.0)	4.1 (39.4)	−0.9 (30.4)	−7.3 (18.9)	−7.3 (18.9)
Average precipitation mm (inches)	75.1 (2.96)	89.9 (3.54)	187.2 (7.37)	194.2 (7.65)	224.7 (8.85)	260.7 (10.26)	144.7 (5.70)	132.0 (5.20)	80.5 (3.17)	56.8 (2.24)	81.4 (3.20)	57.7 (2.27)	1,584.9 (62.41)
Average precipitation days (≥ 0.1 mm)	13.7	13.8	18.4	17.4	16.8	16.8	11.5	12.9	8.6	7.6	9.9	10.2	157.6
Average snowy days	2.5	1.6	0.3	0	0	0	0	0	0	0	0	0.7	5.1
Average relative humidity (%)	79	79	82	81	81	84	78	80	79	76	78	76	79
Mean monthly sunshine hours	63.2	63.9	68.3	94.1	112.7	109.0	203.2	184.3	145.8	139.2	113.9	102.3	1,399.9
Percentage possible sunshine	19	20	18	24	27	26	48	46	40	39	36	32	31
Source: China Meteorological Administration
