= Mufu Mountains =

Mountain range in China

Mufu Range
- 幕阜山
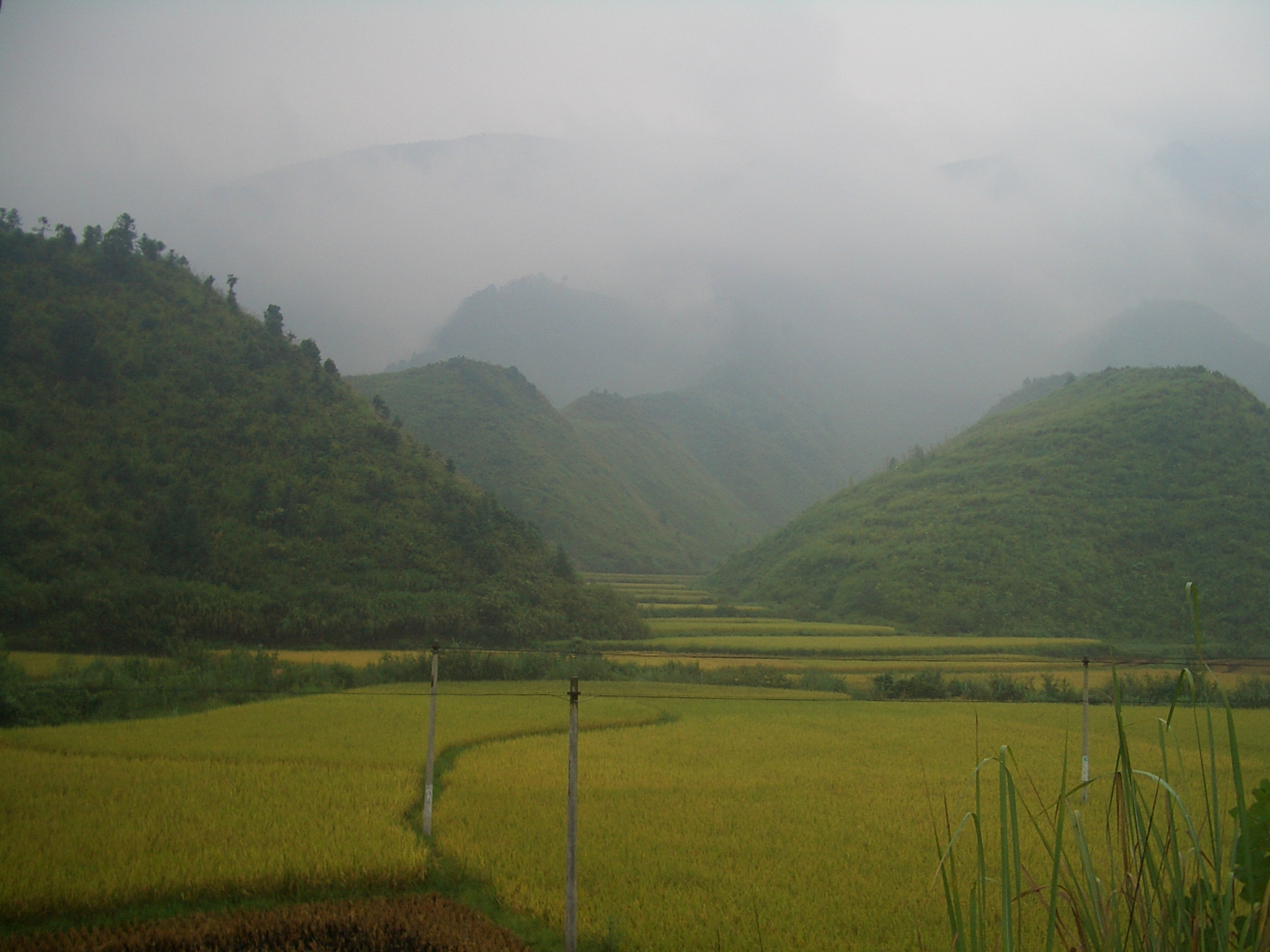
- Rice fields in a valley in the Mufu Range, seen from National Highway 106 east of Tongshan

Highest point
- Elevation: 1,597.2 m (5,240 ft)
- Coordinates: 28°59′N 113°50′E

Geography
- Location within Eastern China Location within China
- Location: Hubei, Hunan and Jiangxi, China
- Parent range: Luoxiao Mountains

The Mufu Mountains (Chinese: 幕阜山; pinyin: Mùfù Shān) are a range of mountains located on the border of Jiangxi and Hubei provinces in China.

Some maps label the range as 幕埠山, which would be transliterated as Mùbù Shān (Mubu Mountains), but this apparently is a typo.

== Description ==
The Mufu range is a subrange of the Luoxiao Mountains. It stretches for about 200 km in a roughly southwest–northeast direction between close to Pingjiang in Hunan to the Yangtze valley near Jiujiang.
