= List of pig breeds =

There are hundreds of breeds of the domestic pig (Sus scrofa domesticus).

== List with classification and standards ==
| Breed | Origin | Height | Weight | Color | Image |
|---|---|---|---|---|---|
| Aksai Black Pied | Kazakhstan | 167–182 cm | 240–320 kg (530–710 lb) | Black and White | --- |
| American Yorkshire | United States | 84–91 cm (33–36 in) | 204–340 kg (450–750 lb) | White | |
| Angeln Saddleback | Germany | 84–92 cm (33–36 in) | 300–350 kg (660–770 lb) | Black and White | |
| Ankamali | India | --- | --- | Black | |
| Appalachian English | United States | --- | --- | --- | --- |
| Arapawa Island | New Zealand | --- | 100–180 kg (220–400 lb) | Red and Black | |
| Auckland Island | New Zealand | --- | --- | Black or Black and Tan | |
| Australian Yorkshire | Australia | --- | --- | White | |
| Babi Kampung | Indonesia | --- | --- | --- | --- |
| Ba Xuyen | Vietnam | --- | 100 kg (220 lb) | Black and White | --- |
| Bantu | Southern Africa | --- | 95–100 kg | Brown | --- |
| Basque | France | --- | --- | Black, White or White with Black markings | |
| Bazna | Romania | --- | --- | Black and White | --- |
| Beijing Black (北京黑猪) | China | --- | --- | Black | |
| Belarus Black Pied | Belarus | --- | --- | White with Blark markings | |
| Belgian Landrace | Belgium | --- | --- | White | |
| Bengali Brown Shannaj | India | --- | --- | Brown | --- |
| Bentheim Black Pied pig | Germany | 70–75 cm (28–30 in) | 180–250 kg (400–550 lb) | White with Black markings | |
| Berkshire | United Kingdom | --- | --- | Black with some White markings | |
| Bisaro | Portugal | 160 cm (63 in) | 180–250 kg (400–550 lb) | Black and White | |
| Bangur | Nepal | --- | 205–600 kg (452–1,323 lb) | Black and White | --- |
| Black Slavonian | Croatia | --- | --- | Black | --- |
| Black Canarian | Canary Islands | --- | --- | Black | --- |
| Breitovo | Russia | --- | --- | --- | --- |
| British Landrace | United Kingdom | --- | --- | White | |
| British Lop | United Kingdom | --- | --- | White | |
| British Saddleback | United Kingdom | --- | --- | Black and White | |
| Bulgarian White | Bulgaria | --- | --- | White | |
| Cantonese | China | --- | --- | --- | --- |
| Celtic | Galicia, Spain | 80 cm (31 in) | --- | Black and White | |
| Chato Murciano | Spain | --- | 180 kg (400 lb) | Black, White or Black and White | --- |
| Chester White | United States | --- | --- | White | |
| Chiangmai Blackpig a.k.a. MooDum Chiangmai | Thailand | --- | --- | Black | |
| Choctaw hog | United States | --- | 60 kg (130 lb) | Black | |
| Cinta Senese | Italy | --- | --- | --- | |
| Creole pig | Haiti | --- | --- | Black | |
| Cumberland (extinct) | United Kingdom | --- | --- | White | |
| Czech Improved White | Czech Republic | --- | --- | White | |
| Danish Landrace | Denmark | --- | --- | White | |
| Dermantsi Pied | Bulgaria | --- | --- | --- | --- |
| Li Yan | Singapore Boon Lay | --- | --- | --- | --- |
| Dharane Kalo sungur | Dharan, Nepal | --- | --- | --- | --- |
| Duroc | United States | --- | --- | Black or Red | |
| Dutch Landrace | Netherlands | --- | --- | --- | |
| East Balkan | Bulgaria | --- | --- | --- | --- |
| Essex | United Kingdom | --- | --- | Black and White | |
| Estonian Bacon | Estonia | --- | --- | --- | --- |
| Fengling | China | --- | --- | --- | --- |
| Finnish Landrace | Finland | --- | --- | --- | --- |
| Forest Mountain | Armenia | --- | 165–260 kg (364–573 lb) | White | |
| French Landrace | France | --- | --- | White | |
| Gascon | France | --- | --- | Black | |
| German Landrace | Germany | 80–90 cm | 250–320 kg (550–710 lb) | White | |
| Gloucestershire Old Spots | United Kingdom | --- | 220–280 kg (490–620 lb) | White with Black spots | |
| Göttingen minipig | Germany | 35 cm | 34 kg (75 lb) | White | |
| Grice | United Kingdom | --- | --- | --- | |
| Guinea hog | United States | --- | 200 kg (440 lb) | Black | |
| Hampshire | United Kingdom | --- | --- | Black and White | |
| Hante | --- | --- | --- | --- | --- |
| Hereford | United States | --- | 200–370 kg (440–820 lb) | Red and White | |
| Hezuo | China | --- | --- | --- | --- |
| Hogan | Baraga, MI, United States | --- | --- | --- | --- |
| Husumer or Danish Protest pig | Germany | 92 cm (36 in) | 350 kg (770 lb) | Red and White | |
| Huntingdon Black | United Kingdom | --- | --- | Black with White socks | --- |
| Iberian | Iberian Peninsula | --- | --- | Black or Red | |
| Iron Age pig | United Kingdom | --- | --- | Black or Gray | |
| Italian Landrace | Italy | --- | --- | White | |
| Japanese Landrace | Japan | --- | --- | --- | |
| Jeju Black | Jeju Island, South Korea | --- | --- | Black | |
| Jinhua | China | --- | --- | Black and White | |
| Juliana | Europe | --- | --- | Tri-Colored | |
| Kakhetian | Georgia | --- | --- | --- | |
| Kele | Guizhou, China | --- | --- | --- | --- |
| Kemerovo | Russia | --- | --- | --- | --- |
| Korean Native | Korea | --- | --- | Black | --- |
| Krškopolje | Slovenia | --- | --- | Black and white | |
| Kunekune | New Zealand | 60 cm (24 in) | 68–100 kg (150–220 lb) | Black, Brown, Red, Cream, Gold-tip, Black and White or Tri-colored | |
| Lacombe | Canada | --- | --- | --- | --- |
| Large Black | United Kingdom | --- | 270–360 kg (600–790 lb) | Black | |
| Large Black and White | --- | --- | --- | Black and White | --- |
| Large White | United Kingdom | --- | --- | White | |
| Latvian White | Latvia | --- | --- | White | |
| Leicoma | Germany | --- | --- | --- | --- |
| Linderödssvin | Sweden | --- | --- | Black, Red, Black and White or Tri-Colored | |
| Lithuanian Native | Lithuania | --- | --- | Black, Red, Black and White or Tri-Colored | |
| Lithuanian White | Lithuania | --- | --- | White | |
| Lincolnshire Curly Coat (extinct) | United Kingdom | --- | --- | White | |
| Livenskay | Russia | --- | 240–320 kg (530–710 lb) | White, Black, Red | --- |
| Malhado de Alcobaça | Portugal | --- | --- | Black and White | --- |
| Mangalica | Hungary | --- | --- | Red, Blond or Swallow-Bellied | |
| Meishan (梅山猪) | China | --- | --- | Black | |
| Middle White | United Kingdom | --- | --- | White | |
| Minzhu (民猪) | China | --- | --- | --- | --- |
| Minokawa Buta | Japan | --- | --- | --- | --- |
| Mong Cai | Vietnam | --- | --- | --- | --- |
| Mora Romagnola | Italy | --- | --- | --- | |
| Moura | Brazil | --- | --- | --- | --- |
| Mukota | Zimbabwe | --- | --- | --- | --- |
| Mulefoot | Gulf Coast, United States | --- | --- | --- | --- |
| Murom | Vladmir, Russia | --- | --- | --- | --- |
| Myrhorod | Ukraine | --- | --- | Black and White | |
| Nero Siciliano | Italy - Sicily | 60–65 cm (24–26 in) | 150 kg (330 lb) | Black | |
| Neijiang | Sichuan, China | --- | --- | --- | --- |
| Ningxiang | Ningxiang, China | --- | --- | --- | --- |
| North Caucasian | Russia and Uzbekistan | --- | --- | --- | --- |
| North Siberian | Russia | --- | --- | --- | --- |
| Norwegian Landrace | Norway | --- | --- | White | |
| Norwegian Yorkshire | Norway | --- | --- | --- | |
| Ossabaw Island hog | Ossabaw Island | 51 cm (20 in) | 90 kg (200 lb) | Black and Spotted, among many others | |
| Oxford Sandy and Black | United Kingdom | --- | --- | Sandy Brown with Black markings | |
| Pakchong 5 | Thailand | --- | --- | --- | --- |
| Philippine Native | Philippines | --- | --- | --- | --- |
| Piétrain | Wallonia | --- | --- | White with Black markings | |
| Pennywell miniature pig | United Kingdom | --- | --- | --- | |
| Poland China (波中猪) | United States | --- | --- | --- | |
| Red Wattle hog | United States | 120 cm (47 in) | 270–680 kg (600–1,500 lb) | Red | |
| Semirechensk | Kazakhstan | --- | --- | --- | --- |
| Siberian Black Pied | Russia | --- | --- | White with Black markings | |
| Small Black (extinct) | United Kingdom | --- | --- | Black | |
| Small White (extinct) | United Kingdom | --- | --- | White | |
| Spots | England | --- | --- | --- | --- |
| Surabaya Babi | Surabaya, Indonesia | --- | --- | --- | --- |
| Sushan pig (苏山猪) | China | 156.5 cm (boars); 153.1 cm (sows) (length) | 225.3 kg (boars); 190.4 kg (sows) | White | |
| Swabian-Hall | Germany | --- | --- | Black and White | |
| Swedish Landrace | Sweden | --- | --- | White | |
| Taihu (太湖猪) | China | --- | --- | Black | --- |
| Tamworth | United Kingdom | 50–65 cm (20–26 in) | 250–370 kg (550–820 lb) | Red | |
| Teacup pig | --- | --- | --- | --- | --- |
| Tsivilsk | Russia | --- | --- | White | --- |
| Turopolje | Croatia | --- | --- | --- | |
| Ukrainian Spotted Steppe | Ukraine | --- | --- | --- | --- |
| Ukrainian White Steppe | Ukraine | --- | --- | White | |
| Urzhum | Russia | --- | --- | --- | --- |
| Vietnamese Pot-Bellied | Vietnam | 40–66 cm (16–26 in) | 45–90 kg (99–198 lb) | Black or Black with White markings | |
| Welsh | United Kingdom | --- | 110–140 kg (240–310 lb) | White | |
| Wessex Saddleback | United Kingdom | --- | --- | Black and White | |
| West French White | France | --- | --- | White | |
| Windsnyer | --- | --- | --- | --- | --- |
| Wuzishan | --- | --- | --- | --- | --- |
| Yanan | --- | --- | --- | --- | --- |
| Yorkshire Blue and White (extinct) | United Kingdom | --- | --- | Blue and White | --- |

== See also ==
- List of sheep breeds
- List of goat breeds
- List of cattle breeds
- Lists of domestic animal breeds
