= List of North American pig breeds =

This is a list of pig breeds usually considered to originate or have developed in Canada and the United States. Some may have complex or obscure histories, so inclusion here does not necessarily imply that a breed is predominantly or exclusively from those countries.

Breed name	Notes	Image
American Berkshire		
American Landrace		
American Yorkshire		
Chester White		
Choctaw Hog		
Duroc		
Guinea Hog		
Hampshire		
Hereford		
Lacombe	Canada; in the USA known as Saddleback	
Mulefoot		
Ossabaw Island Hog		
Pineywoods		
Poland China		
Red Wattle Hog		
Spotted Poland China		
Yucatan Miniature		
