= Meidam =

Pig breed

- Country of origin: England

Traits

The Meidam is a breed of domestic pig. It was bred in England from the Meishan pig, crossed with other breeds such as the Landrace pig. It is especially fecund because it has 16 teats.

== See also ==
- List of domestic pig breeds
