= Aksai Black Pied =

Kazakh breed of pig

- Other names: Russian: Аксайская черно-пестрая; aksaiskaya cherno-pestraya
- Country of origin: Kazakhstan

Traits

The Aksai Black Pied (Russian: Аксайская черно-пестрая, romanized: Aksaiskaya cherno-pestraya) is a distinctively black and white spotted pig breed from Kazakhstan.

== History ==
The breed was developed starting in 1952 at the Kasalenki state breeding and the Aksai experimental and training farms as a meat production pig. Native pigs were crossed with Large Whites and Berkshires, later being further bred with Large White and Estonian Bacon breeds to increase meat and bacon production; sows are also commercially crossed with North Caucasian and Landrace boars.

It was bred successfully, reaching its largest population of 11,000 in 1980, but has since declined.

== Characteristics ==
The average weight is around 245 kg (sow) 317 kg (boar).
