= Belgian Landrace =

Breed of pig

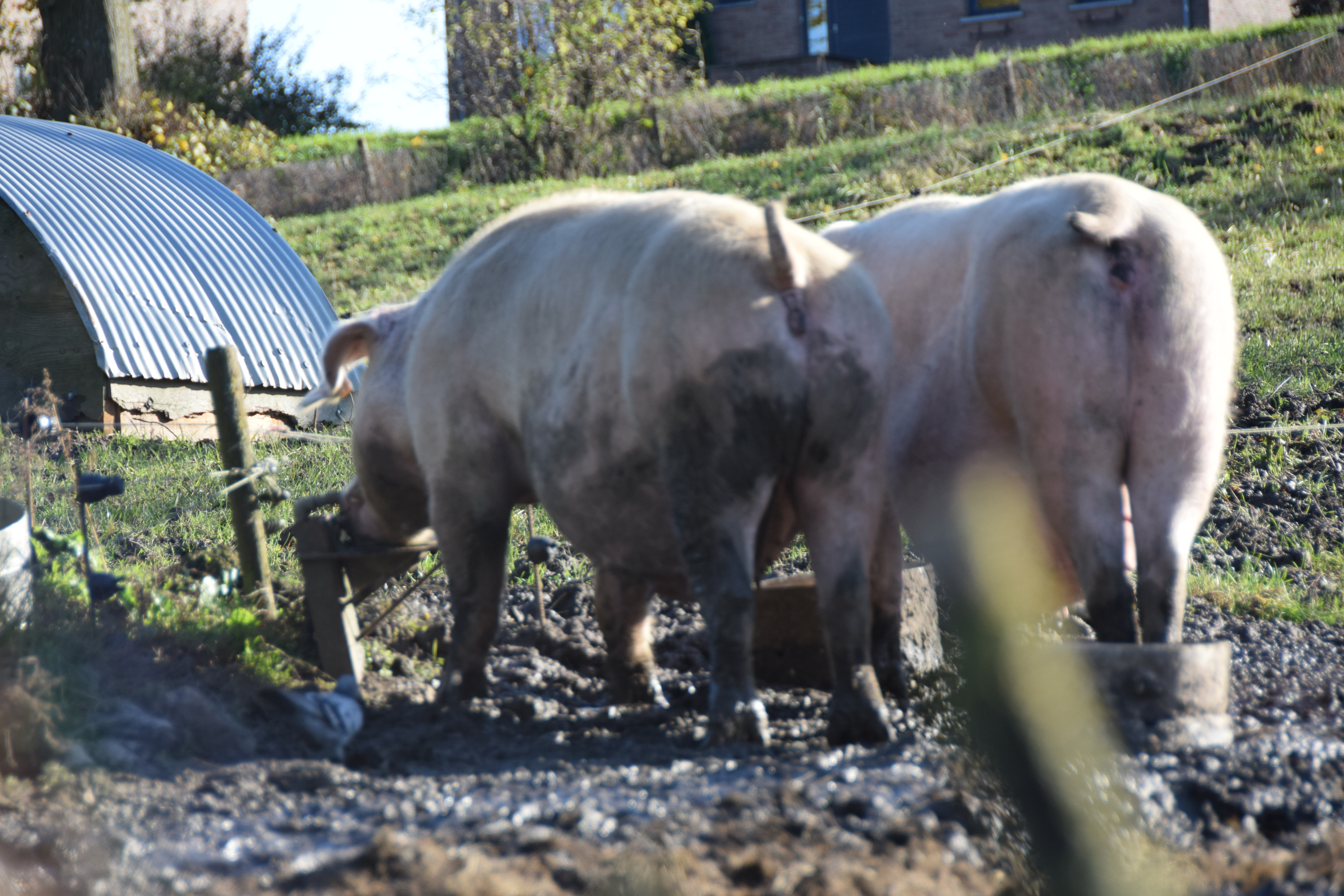
- Belgian Landrace
- Conservation status: Least Concern
- Other names: Improved Belgian, Belgian Improved Landrace, Belgian Lop-eared, Landrace beige (French), Indigene ameliore (French), Poppel (French), Belgisch Landvarken (Flemish), Veredeld Landvarken (Flemish), Belgijska zwisloucha (Polish), Landrasse B (German)
- Country of origin: Belgium

Traits

The Belgian Landrace, also known as the Improved Belgian, Belgian Improved Landrace, and the Belgian Lop-eared, is a breed of domestic pig from northern Belgium. It was created from importing English breeds and improving them until they were "graded up" to the German Improved Landrace from 1930 to 1945 and then breeding them with the Dutch Landrace in 1945. Other breeds were also incorporated into the bloodline to strengthen it, such as with ones from Luxembourg in 1955, Germany in 1971, and the Czech Republic in 1974. Used in many different countries, the Belgian Landrace is also one of the "four major commercial breeds" in France.

== Breeding ==
Because the Belgian Landrace breed is well known for its pork production, it is often bred with other breeds to increase the overall quality of the pork. It is known for being more heavily muscled than other breeds and for being considerably large, along with having a consequent "lower fat content". A significant amount of ongoing testing has been conducted in the past few decades to maximize the amount of high quality lean and minimize the amount of fat on the breed. There are "eight stations testing over 5,000 pigs per year to isolate those strains capable of further improvement."

In order for the breed to go to sale in Belgium, Belgian Landrace sows are often bred with Piétrain boars, which improves the quality of the Belgian breed. The offspring are then bred back into the main Belgian Landrace line, bringing with them the better quality of pork. The meat it produces is lean and tender.

== Description ==
The Belgian Landrace has been described as "a muscular white breed with heavy drooping ears." They are shorter in a number of characteristics in comparison with other Landrace breeds, but are also "a very practical type that are sound in feet and legs, have good fertility, perform well in confinement, are good mothers and milk well until early weaning".

== See also ==
- List of domestic pig breeds
