= Australian Yorkshire =

Breed of pig

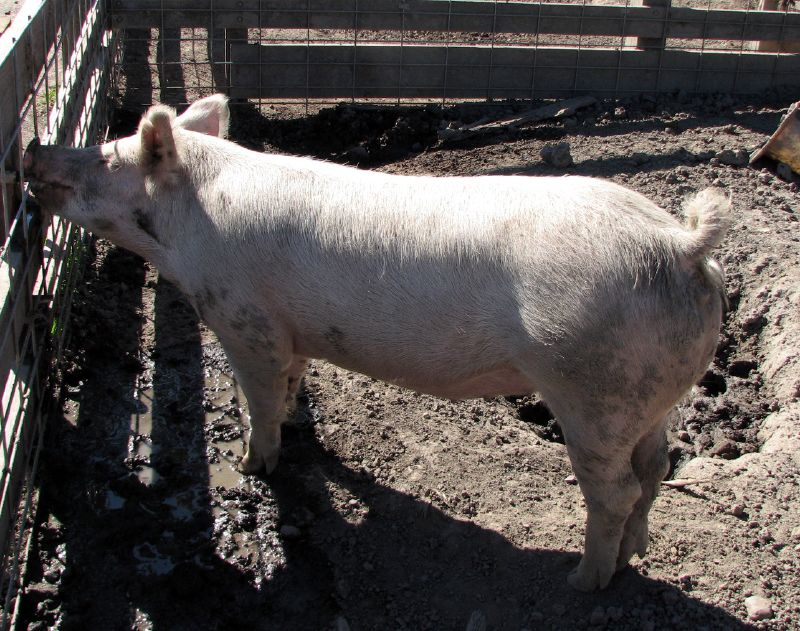
- An Australian Yorkshire Pig
- Conservation status: Least Concern
- Other names: Large White
- Country of origin: Australia
- Use: Meat and Crossbreeding

Traits
- Hair: White

Notes
- Derives from Large White pig

The Australian Yorkshire is a breed of domestic pig from Australia that was originally a part of the Yorkshire breed of pigs from Yorkshire, England. It is said to be the most common and popular breed of pig in Australia due to economic and nutritional advantages.

The Australian Yorkshire has had a large impact on the Asian market, with special modifications being made to meet consumer demands.

The Australian Yorkshire pig has been utilised in both international and domestic crossbreeding programs. These programs have developed pigs with advantageous marketable traits, including faster growth rates, leaner carcass content and higher littering ability.

== History of breed development ==
The Australian Yorkshire pig was first introduced to Australia at the end of the 19th century. Originating from the Yorkshire breed of pigs from England, this breed is also commonly referred to as the ‘Australian Large White’ breed.

=== Breed popularity ===
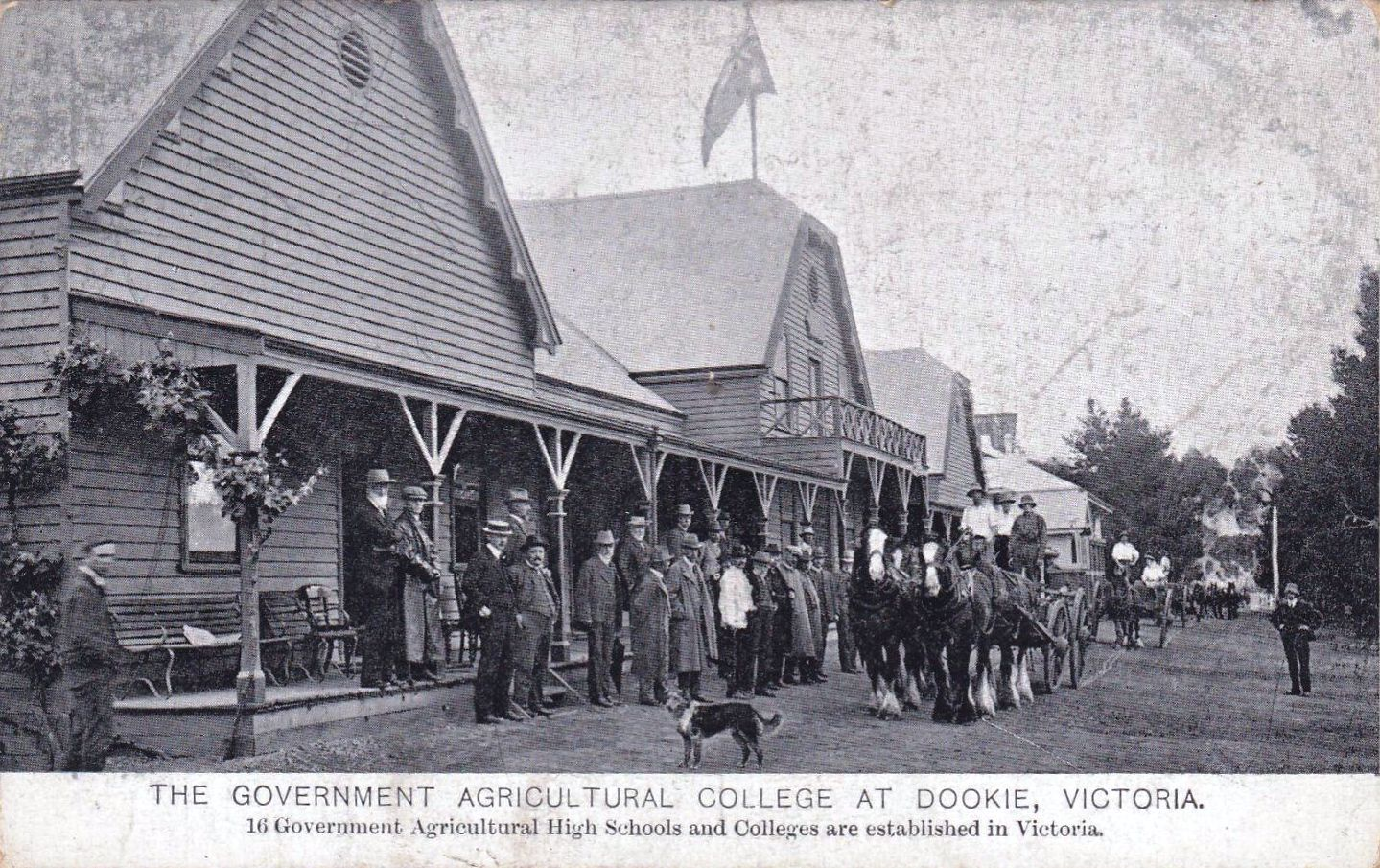
Dookie Agricultural College, Victoria, Australia

Dookie Agricultural College in Victoria (Australia) is recognised as breeding the first pedigree Australian Yorkshire pigs. The breed reached popularity in Sydney in 1921, expanding to southern and western Victoria, southern Queensland and Adelaide by 1931. In 1941 the breed was established in southern coastal New South Wales, northern Queensland, Tasmania and Western Australia. In the 1950s and 1960s the breed's popularity increased and it is still Australia's most popular breed of pig due to both economic advantages and quality of lean meat produced.

The Australian Yorkshire breed is commonly utilised in both international and domestic crossbreeding programs. These programs have produced animals ready for market, meeting “consumer’s requirements of low amounts of fat and high levels of lean meat content.”

== Physical characteristics ==
The Australian Yorkshire breed has a large-frame, with a “long middle and light shoulders." The breed's skin is white in colour with erect ears, a moderately long head and a slightly dished face. The Australian Yorkshire is late to mature even though it is considered the “best for growth rate, food efficiency and carcass quality."

The Australian Yorkshire benefits from several advantageous genetic qualities. This tough breed is able to tolerate a wide variety of environments, particularly tropical climates, whilst possessing optimised litter size and leaner carcass content.

Scientific investigation has discovered that the Australian Yorkshire breed utilises the least energy during its everyday maintenance, with as little as 0.4MJ/day, due to minimum physical activity. This small expenditure allows for more available energy for growth and has improved the “pigs’ resistance to stress of high temperature and long-distance transport.” These advantageous genotypes allow for leaner meat quality, particularly when transported and for a higher conversion rate of feed to meat.

Results from experimentation discovered an absence in the spike of muscle pH at the time of slaughter, indicating “no increase in the level of dark, firm, dry pork.

== Reproductive traits ==
=== Boar performance ===
The Australian Centre for International Agricultural Research (ACIAR) and the Australian Agency for International Development (AusAID) funded the construction of five Artificial insemination (AI) centres for pigs in Vietnam. In November 2000 a centre opened in Binh Thuan, which housed “10 Australian Yorkshire boars selected from the nucleus herds at the Binh Thang Centre.” The high quality semen produced by Australian Yorkshire boars allows for a much higher conception rate than other local and exotic breeds. Farmers buy and inseminate their sows with semen doses from these centres. A single 50ml dose will achieve “a conception rate of around 80%.” A travelling boar is much more expensive, the availability of AI technology has witnessed the decline in natural mating services.

Table 1 compares the volume, viability and density characteristics of semen from Australian Yorkshires (AY) and Vietnamese Yorkshires (VY). This table highlights the difference in the number of insemination doses per collection. Table 1 shows that Australian Yorkshire boars can produce 3-5 doses more per collection than local Vietnamese boars. This allows the price of Australian Yorkshire semen to be “5-10% cheaper than that of a Vietnamese boar.”

Table 1. Volume, viability and density characteristics of the semen of Australian and Vietnamese Yorkshire (AY, VY) and the number of insemination doses per collection
Breed of Boar	V (ml)	A (%)	C (millions)	VAC	Number of doses
Local Yorkshire	160	82	180	236	8-10
Australian Yorkshire	180	87	200	313	10-15

=== Littering traits ===
Australian Yorkshire sows are regarded for their large litter sizes, heavy milk production and exceptional maternal instincts. The Binh Thang Centre in Vietnam reported from extensive research that litters surviving to wean from Australian Yorkshire sows are, “on average, about one piglet larger than those for other exotics." This research similarly indicated that the number of piglets born in a litter from sows inseminated by Australian Yorkshire boars “was from 1-2.5% higher than sows inseminated by Vietnamese boars."

These advantageous litter qualities allow for economic advantages from production as fewer sows need to be maintained to produce equal numbers of pigs for slaughter.

Table 2 compares the physical and profitable characteristics of litters from Australian Yorkshire (AY), Vietnamese Yorkshire (VY) and their crosses.

Table 2. Littering traits measured on Australian (AY) and Vietnamese (VY) Yorkshire and their crosses.
Traits	Genotype	96-97	1998	1999	2000
		(Mean + se)			
Total piglets born	AY	9.8 + 1.8	10.3 + 1.3	9.9 + 1.2	10.2 + 1.0
	VY	9.4 + 1.1	9.6 + 1.1	9.5 + 1.4	9.6 + 1.2
	AY X VY	10.0 + 1.8	10.3 + 1.6	10.5 + 1.4	10.8 + 1.3
Number born alive	AY	9.4 + 1.0	9.6 + 0.8	9.5 + 1.1	9.8 + 0.8
	VY	8.9 + 0.8	9.3 + 0.9	9.1 + 1.0	9.2 + 0.9
	AY X VY		9.5 + 0.7	10.1 + 0.7	10.3 + 0.8
Piglet birth weight	AY	1.4 + 0.3	1.45 + 0.3	1.3 + 0.5	1.3 + 0.4
	VY	1.3 + 0.3	1.25 + 0.2	1.3 + 0.3	1.3 + 0.2
	AY X VY		1.35 + 0.4	1.3 + 0.4	1.4 + 0.3
Litter size at 21 days	AY	9.2 + 0.4	9.3 + 0.3	9.2 + 0.3	9.6 + 0.4
	VY	8.7 + 0.3	8.9 + 0.2	8.8 + 0.3	9.0 + 0.3
	AY X VY		9.3 + 0.3	9.5 + 0.2	9.9 + 0.3
Piglet weight at 21 days	AY	6.0 + 0.6	5.9 + 0.4	6.1 + 0.3	6.1 + 0.4
	VY	5.6 + 0.4	5.5 + 0.3	5.5 + 0.3	5.7 + 0.5
	AY X VY		6.1 + 0.4	6.2 + 0.4	6.0 + 0.4
Weaners/litter	AY	8.9 + 0.3	9.0 + 0.4	9.0 + 0.3	9.3 + 0.3
	VY	8.0 + 0.2	8.3 + 0.3	8.4 + 0.3	8.5 + 0.5
	AY X VY		9.1 + 0.4	9.3 + 0.2	9.5 + 0.4
Piglet weaning weight	AY	7.5 + 0.2	7.3 + 0.3	7.2 + 0.3	7.4 + 0.3
	VY	6.5 + 0.5	6.6 + 0.3	6.7 + 0.2	6.6 + 0.5
	AY X VY		7.3 + 0.3	7.2 + 0.4	7.5 + 0.3

== Impact on the Asian market ==
The breed is marketed globally, with special modifications being made for the Asian market.

=== Singapore ===
In Singapore, a branch of the major Australian Yorkshire supplier named Australian Pork Limited was opened to cater to consumers in the country. The pigs sold in Singapore were fed barley grains and soy beans, rather than whey powder, as the latter "gives the meat a milky taste that Singaporeans don't take well to".

=== Vietnam ===
The Vietnamese market is dominated by exotic and crossbred pigs, with local breeds only making up “26% of the national pig herd, mostly in uplands, rural and remote areas.” In Vietnam, numerous experiments have been successfully conducted to illustrate the advantages of Australian Yorkshire pig genotypes, resulting in their rapid increase in popularity. A number of genetic advantages exist supporting the breeding of the Australian Yorkshire pig in Vietnam, revolving around the breeds ability to genetically and nutritionally thrive in the country's tropical climate. Breeding with the genotypes from Australian Yorkshire stock has resulted in an elevated rate of profitable return.

The construction of AI centres in Vietnam has enabled the spread of Australian Yorkshire pigs. Australian Yorkshires have several genetic advantages surpassing the less marketable traits from Vietnamese local breeds, which include “a high fat content, low lean meat ratio, a low growth rate, and…a low fertility rate." Both purebred Australian Yorkshire pigs and Australian Yorkshire crosses have been proven to obtain a significantly faster growth rate and utilise their feed more efficiently than Vietnamese breeds.

==== Profitability ====
The Vietnamese pork produced by local breeds could not find an export market, even within Vietnam, due to the undesirable high fat content of the meat. A price premium of up to 30% higher is charged for leaner Australian Yorkshire pork products.

Comparison between local Vietnamese pigs and imported Australian Yorkshire pigs shows the desirable qualities the latter breed possesses for profitability as “superiority in growth rate and food conversion efficiency, the Yorkshire…was 6-12% more profitable than the local breed."

==== Socio-economic developments in Vietnam ====
Pig farming and production is a large agricultural industry in Vietnam which plays a vital role in “contributing to the rural and national economy." This sector has the ability to raise the living standards and socio-economic development of small and large scale pig farming operations in Vietnam. Vietnamese local pig breeds have steadily been replaced or crossbred with imported Australian Yorkshire pigs over the past decades to increase profitability and performance. This has in turn increased socio-economic developments allowing Australian Yorkshire pigs to become widely obtainable, aiding in the production of higher pork quality.

The crossbreeding projects in Vietnam have similarly achieved high rates of socio-economic returns both through the increase in capital and the increased social impact of promoting pig production whilst raising the average incomes of poor pig farmers.

==== Impacts to Vietnamese local breeds ====
The influx of Australian Yorkshire pigs to the Vietnamese market and breeding programs has similarly diminished the population of indigenous breeds. The 2003 Country Report of Vietnam highlights the critical state of local breeds, of the 14 indigenous pig breeds “five of them are in a vulnerable state, two in a critical state, and three facing extinction."

== In scientific research ==
=== Studies in Vietnam ===
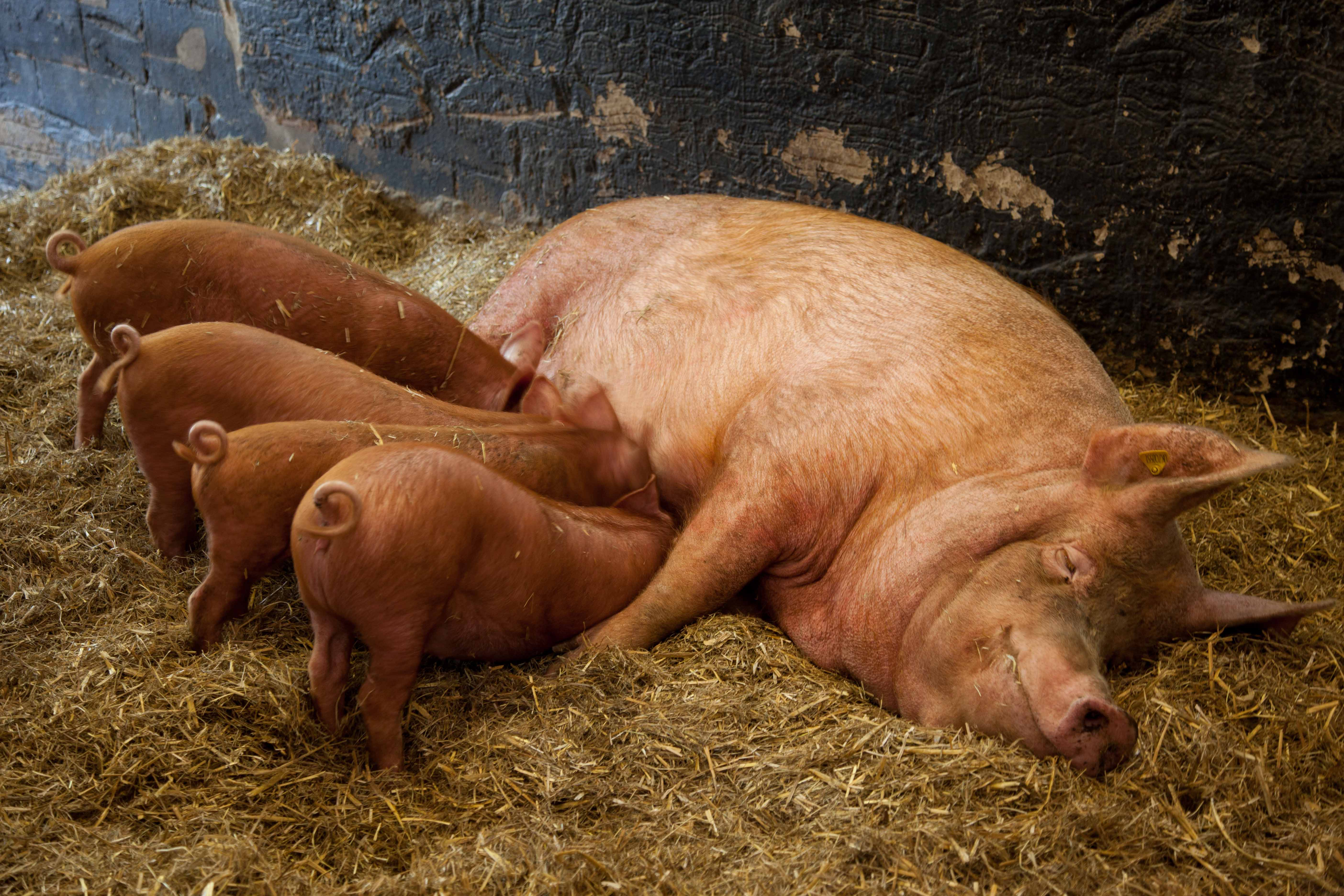
Duroc piglets and sow

In 2001, a study was conducted at the Institute of Agricultural Sciences of South Vietnam in Bihn Thang that compared the Australian Yorkshire and the Duroc to common Vietnamese pigs. It concluded that the pig breeds of Australian manufacture had "significant advantage over Vietnamese breeds in growth, efficiency and carcass lean and in littering performance".

The 2001 study in Vietnam has produced many favourable nutritional and economic results for the pork industry in both Australia and South East Asia. The feed-conversion ratios in pig husbandry increased rapidly whilst the quantity of sows needed “to produce a given annual stock of pigs for slaughter" significantly reduced.

=== Developments in carcass production ===
==== ACIAR Project 9423 ====
The ACIAR Project 9423 ‘Pig Breeding and Feeding in Australia and Vietnam’ was conducted between October 1995 and December 2000 involving collaboration between the Institute of Agricultural Sciences of South Vietnam (IAS) and the Animal Research Institute of the Department of Primary Industries – Queensland (ARI). The extremely successful project was funded by ACIAR and coded ACIAR-9423.

===== Aim =====
The project saw 40 Australian Yorkshire pigs transported to Vietnam to be crossbred with Vietnamese breeds. The breeding project initially sought to improve Australian Yorkshire pig genetic development and nutritional research to produce “low amounts of fat and high levels of lean meat content.” The project similarly sought to develop pig production technology, including international training courses on pig breeding and genetics, and nutritional feed development.

===== Results =====
Findings from the study helped with the production of "leaner pork with great production cost-effectiveness". This resulted in "better quality (less fatty) pork to be produced" from crossbreeding the Australian Yorkshire Pig with local Vietnamese breeds. The ability of the Australian Yorkshire pig to adapt to the local Vietnamese conditions whilst producing favourable characteristics was assessed by the “reproductive performances of sows and the semen quality of the boars."

Between 1999 and 2000 the project saw 1375 offspring from the imported Australian Yorkshire pigs spread throughout 18 provinces across Vietnam supplying livestock to “breeding farms, artificial insemination centres and commercial farms."

===== List of benefits obtained from ACIAR Project 9423 =====
- High lean-meat growth of pigs
- Adaptation of pigs to high temperature
- Stress resistance of pigs
- Nutrient optimisation
- Potential genetic gains
- Better diet formulation
- Alternative feed knowledge
- Enhanced technical knowledge
- Training of scientists
- Training of Industry personnel

==== Lean Meat Content ====
The average percentage of lean meat on an Australian crossed carcass is notably higher than that of local Vietnamese breeds and crosses. The offspring of Australian Yorkshire pigs have proven to obtain higher rates of daily mass gain, feed conversion and level of back-fat thickness than local Vietnamese breeds.

The Binh Thang Centre in Vietnam has produced soft tissue composition results from the carcass dissection of Australian Yorkshire pigs, stating the breed is 56% lean meant and 24.4% fat content. The results from these performance testing centres and projects confirm that the Australian Yorkshire pig has advantageous genetic merit over local Vietnamese breeds, especially relating to reproductive traits, higher growth rate and thickness of back-fat.

==== Carcass Weight ====
The average Australian Yorkshire carcass weighed 65.2 kg in 1993, this was compared with the average weight of a local Vietnamese pigs carcass weighting in at only 59.1 kg. The same carcass weight test was conducted in 2000 revealing an increase in size for both breeds. An Australian Yorkshire average carcass weighed in at 75.6 kg (a 16% increase) and the Vietnamese average carcass weighed in at 67.3 kg (a 13.9% increase).

Pigs from the Australian Yorkshire breed contain higher growth rates and a more “favourable feed-conversion ratio than other pig lines in Vietnam." Vietnamese researchers have found that experiments which test the live weight of pigs by feeding the breeds the same nutritional intake produces a 5% increase in the weight of pigs who contain Australian Yorkshire genes. This is vital evidence for the nutritional and economic advantages of the Australian Yorkshire pig for both producers and consumers.

Developments in carcass production are evidenced through the genetic cross of the Australian Yorkshire pig with Vietnamese breeds in the search to produce a leaner, more marketable and ultimately profitable carcass.
