= Swabian-Hall =

German breed of pig

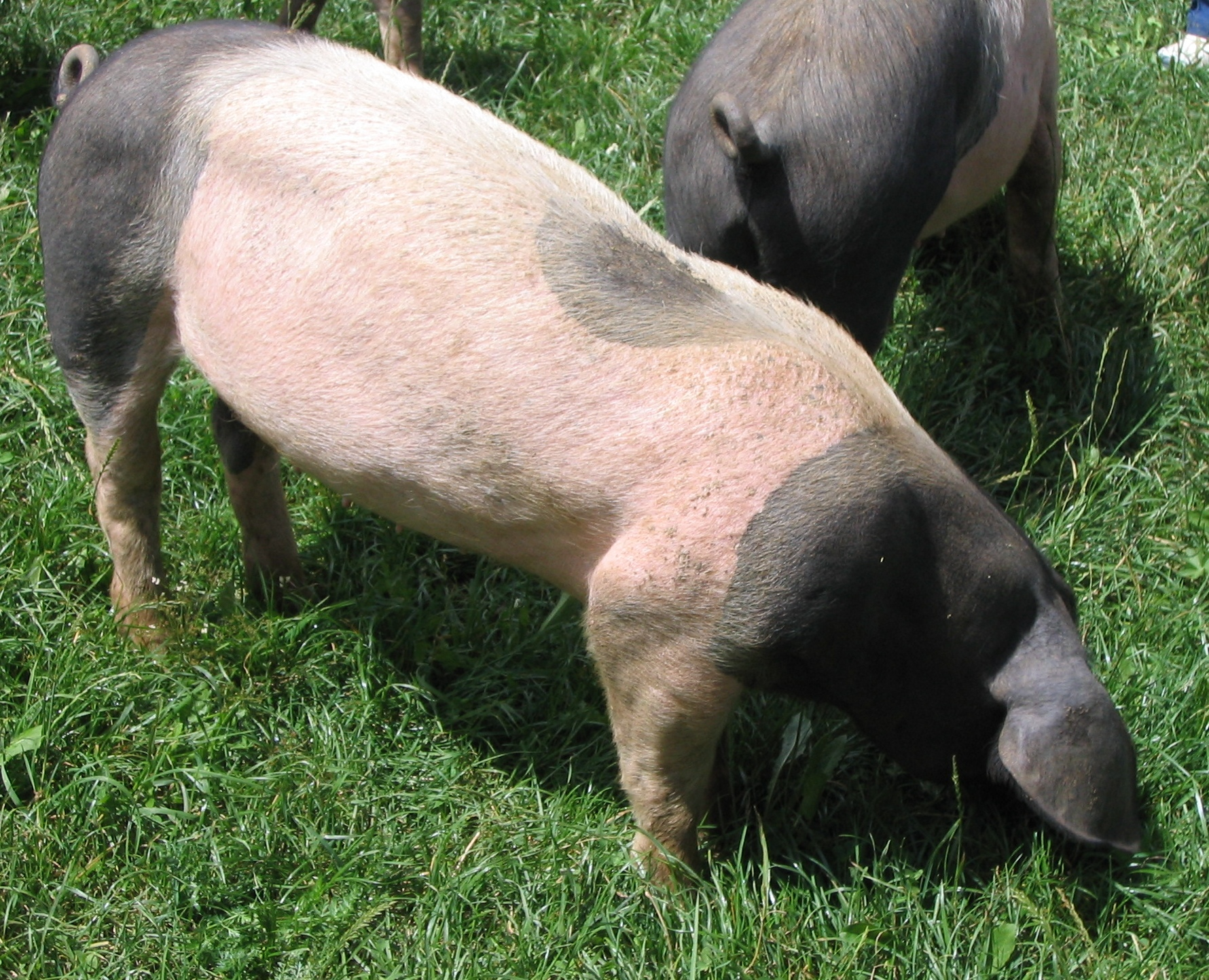
- Swabian-Hall swine
- Country of origin: Germany

Traits

The Swabian-Hall or Schwäbisch-Hällisches, also known as the Mohrenköpfle ('little moor's head'), is a German breed of lard pig originating in the city of Schwäbisch Hall, in Baden-Württemberg in south-western Germany. It is a large pig, white in the centre with a black head and rear and narrow grey bands at the transition from white to black skin. They have large litters averaging more than nine piglets.

The Swabian Hall, nicknamed the 'Mohrenköpfle' due to its colouring, traces its origin to 1820 when King William I of Württemberg initiated a breeding program aimed at producing a new breed with an improved fat content. He imported Meishan pigs from China to crossbreed with the German Landrace, a strategy that proved particularly successful in the Hohenlohe region, and around the town of Schwäbisch Hall. This hybridisation led to the creation of a robust breed that became renowned for its superior quality, especially in terms of fat production, a prized trait in traditional German agriculture. The breed enjoyed widespread popularity, and by 1959, it accounted for 90% of the pigs in Baden-Württemberg. However, its prominence waned in the 1960s as market preferences shifted toward leaner pork with lower fat content, making the breed less commercially viable. Despite this decline, a small group of dedicated farmers in the Hohenlohe district continued to preserve the breed, though by 1984, only seven breeding sows and two boars remained. Since 1998, Swabian-Hall pork (Schwäbisch-Hällisches Qualitätsschweinfleisch) has been recognised with Protected Geographical Status in the European Union. Only pigs raised in Schwäbisch Hall, Hohenlohe, and some neighbouring districts may be sold under that name. Currently, there are around 1,500 sows registered to this breed. All of these pigs are raised on farms belonging to the Farmer Producer Association of Swabian Hall (Bäuerliche Erzeugergemeinschaft Schwäbisch Hall), which enforces a strict inspection regime to control the quality of feed provided to the animals. The Swabian-Hall Breeders Association (Züchtervereinigung Schwäbisch Hällisches Schwein) was established in 1977, predating the Producers Association, which was formed in 2007. Today, the Breeders Association operates as a subsidiary of the Producers Association. Today, the Swabian-Hall pig is highly esteemed among gourmets for its darker, richly flavoured meat and distinctive taste, which sets it apart from leaner varieties.

== Gallery ==
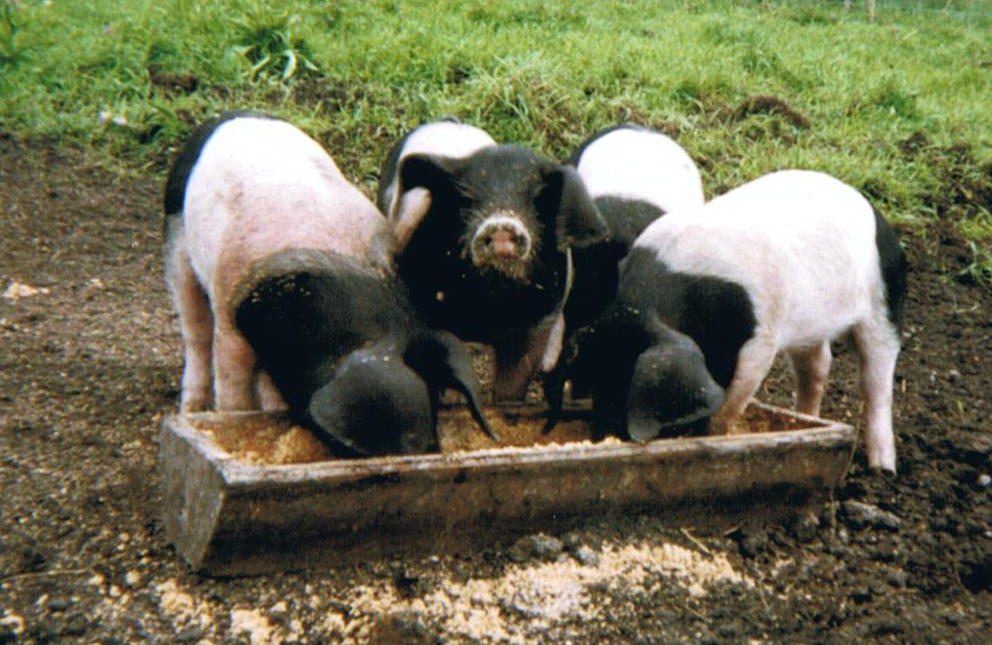

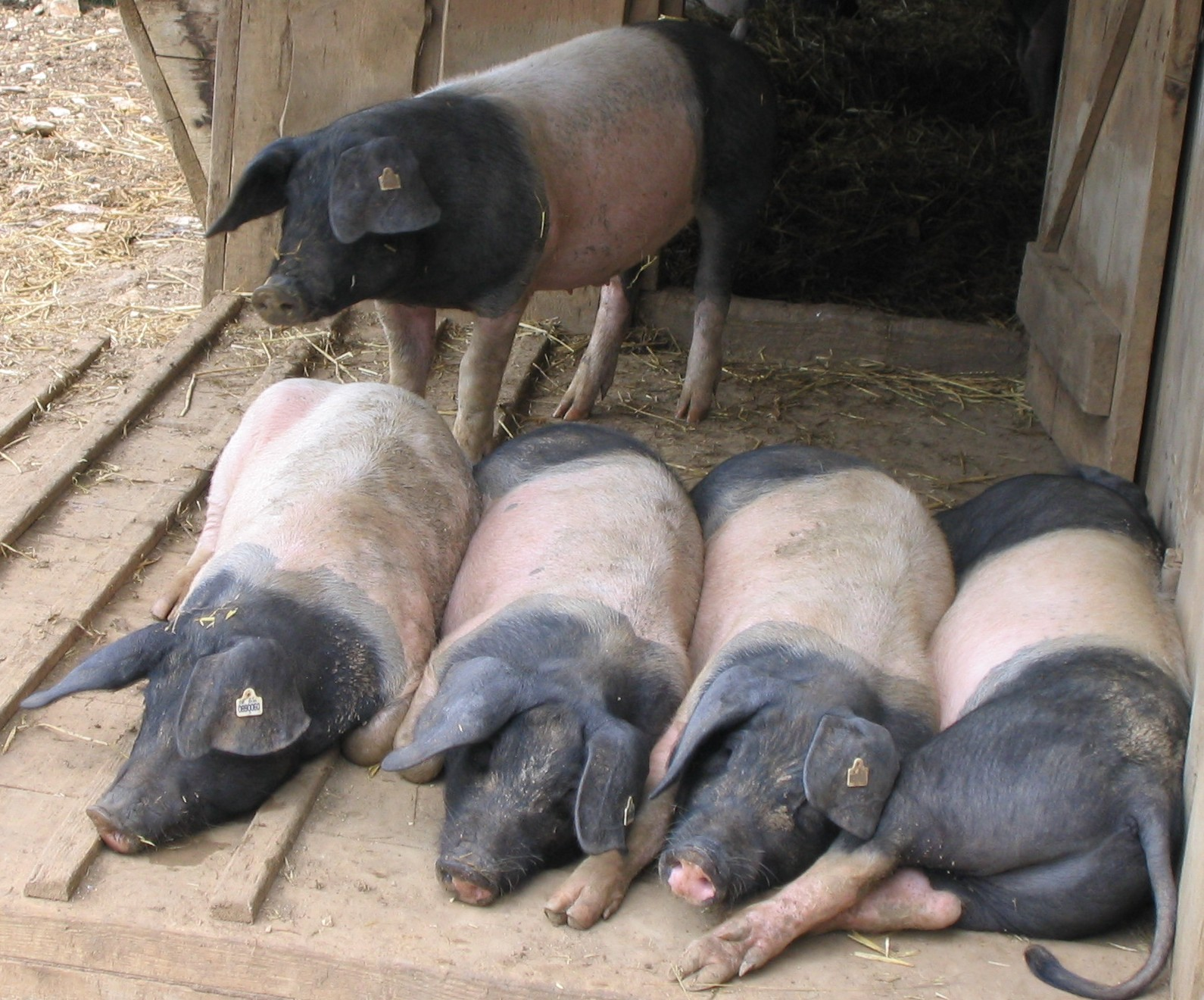
