= American Landrace =

American breed of pig

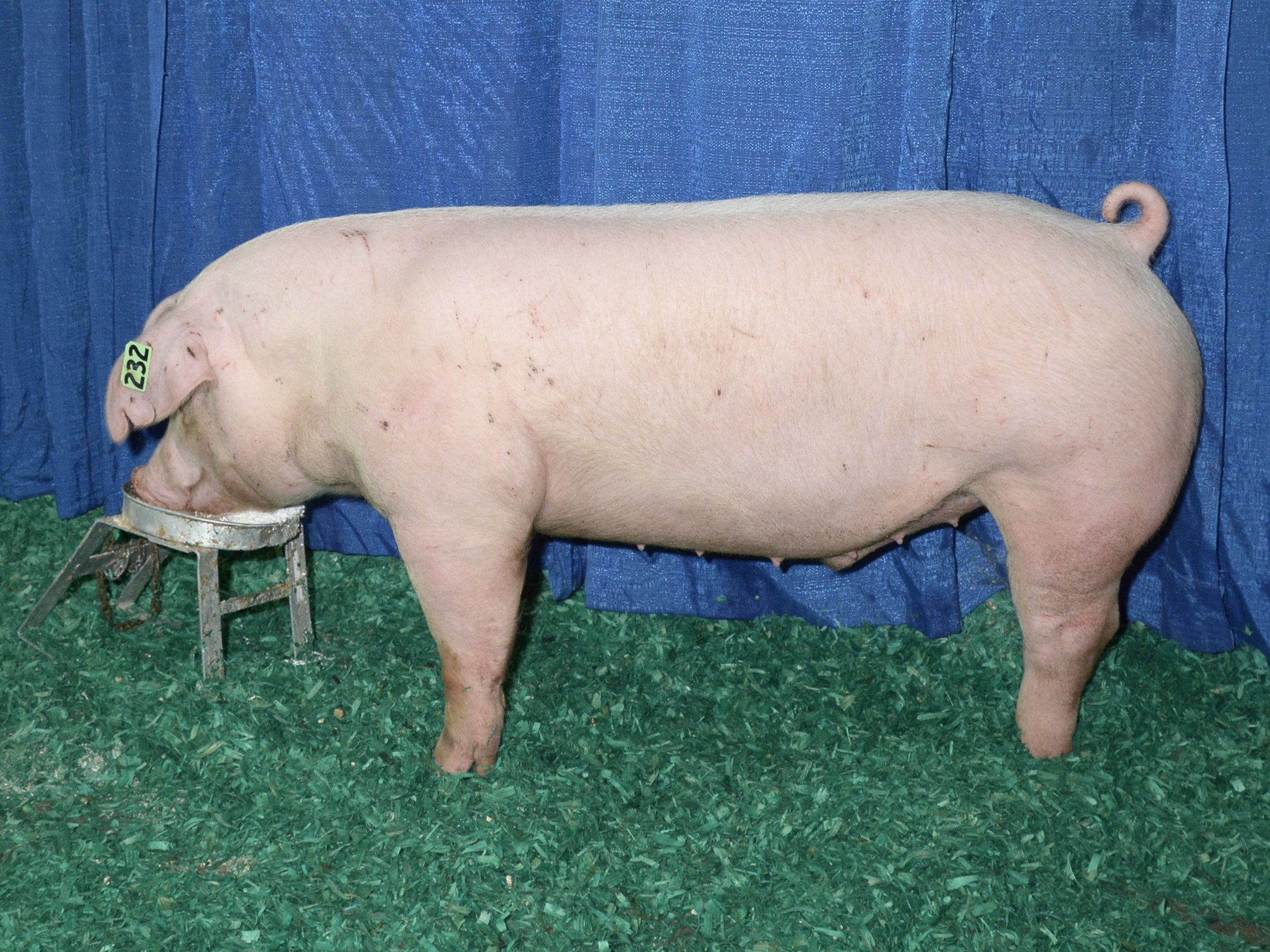
- Barrow at the Keystone International Livestock Exposition in 2018

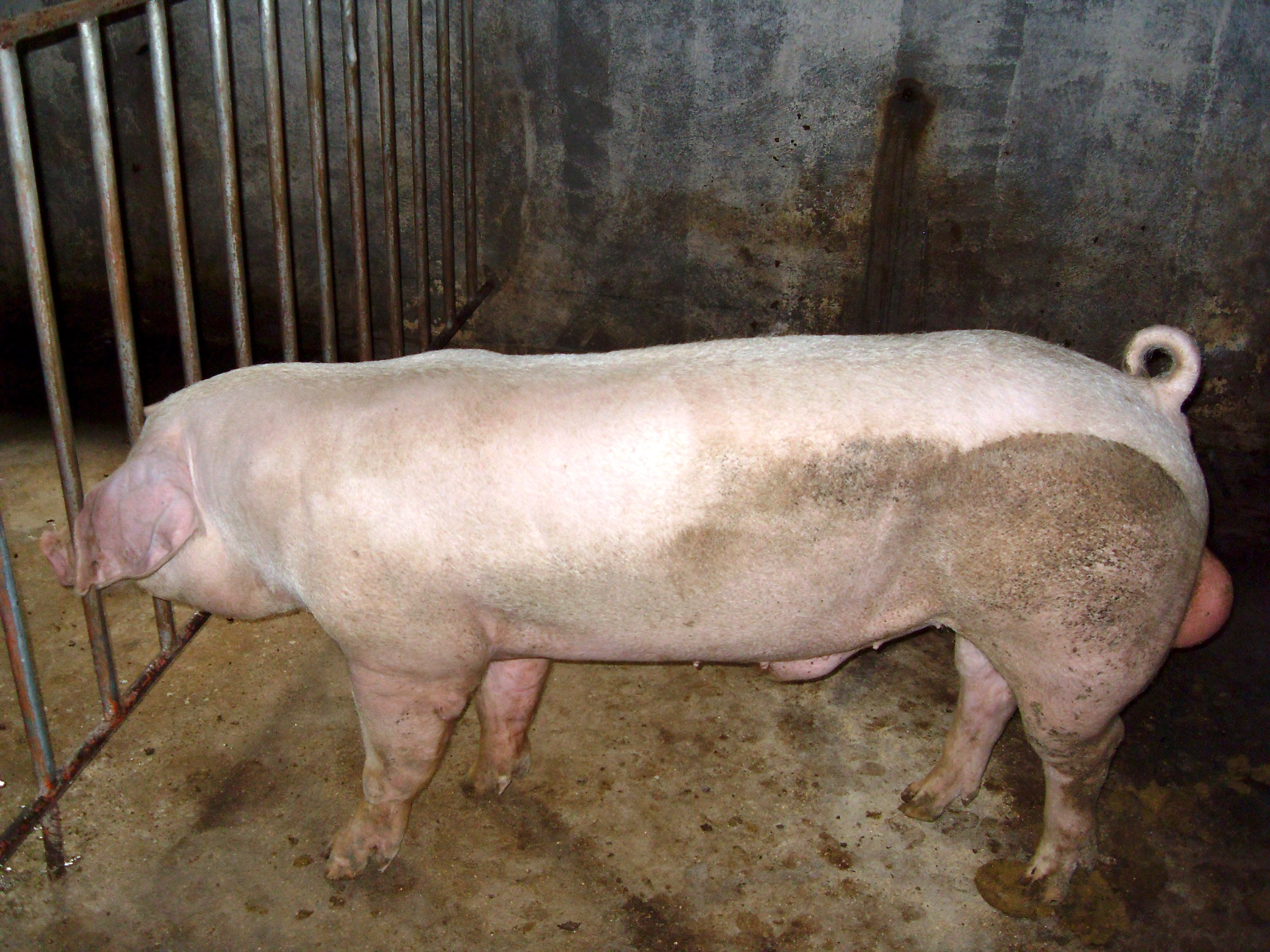
- A boar
- Conservation status: FAO (2007): not at risk; DAD-IS (2025): not at risk
- Country of origin: United States

Traits
- Skin colour: unpigmented
- Hair colour: white

Notes
- Derives from Danish Landrace

The American Landrace is an American breed of domestic pig. It is white in color, with a long body, fine hair, a long snout and heavy, drooping ears. Like all landrace pigs, it derives from the Danish Landrace. The breed association, the American Landrace Association, is one of four that constitute the National Swine Registry, together with the associations for the American Yorkshire, the Duroc and the Hampshire. It is the fourth-most numerous pig of the United States after those three breeds.

== History ==
The American Landrace derives from the Danish Landrace, which in turn derives from cross-breeding in the late nineteenth century between local Danish pigs and Large White stock imported from Britain. In 1934 twenty-four of these pigs were imported from Denmark by the United States Department of Agriculture for cross-breeding and research purposes, with a condition that they not be used to create a purebred commercial stock. That restriction was lifted in 1949 and a breed association, the American Landrace Association, was established in 1950. The new breed was founded on stock that was either purebred Danish or had a small percentage of Poland China blood. To reduce inbreeding, thirty-eight pigs of Danish, Swedish and Norwegian Landrace descent were imported in 1954 from Norway.

The breed association is one of four that constitute the National Swine Registry, together with the associations for the American Yorkshire, the Duroc and the Hampshire. In 2016 it was the fourth-most numerous pig of the United States after those three breeds. A total population of 15324 head was reported for 2023, down from a high of 70657 reached in 2017. The conservation status of the breed in 2025 was "not at risk".

== Characteristics ==
The American Landrace is a long, lean, white pig with 16 or 17 ribs. The head is long and narrow, the ears are large and heavy and hang forward close to the snout. The back is only slightly arched or is nearly flat. The side is even and well-fleshed and the ham is plump but not over-fat. The sows produce plenty of milk, the lactation peaking at five weeks, which is rather later than is the case in most breeds. They are prolific with good mothering abilities.
