= Hereford Hog =

Breed of pig

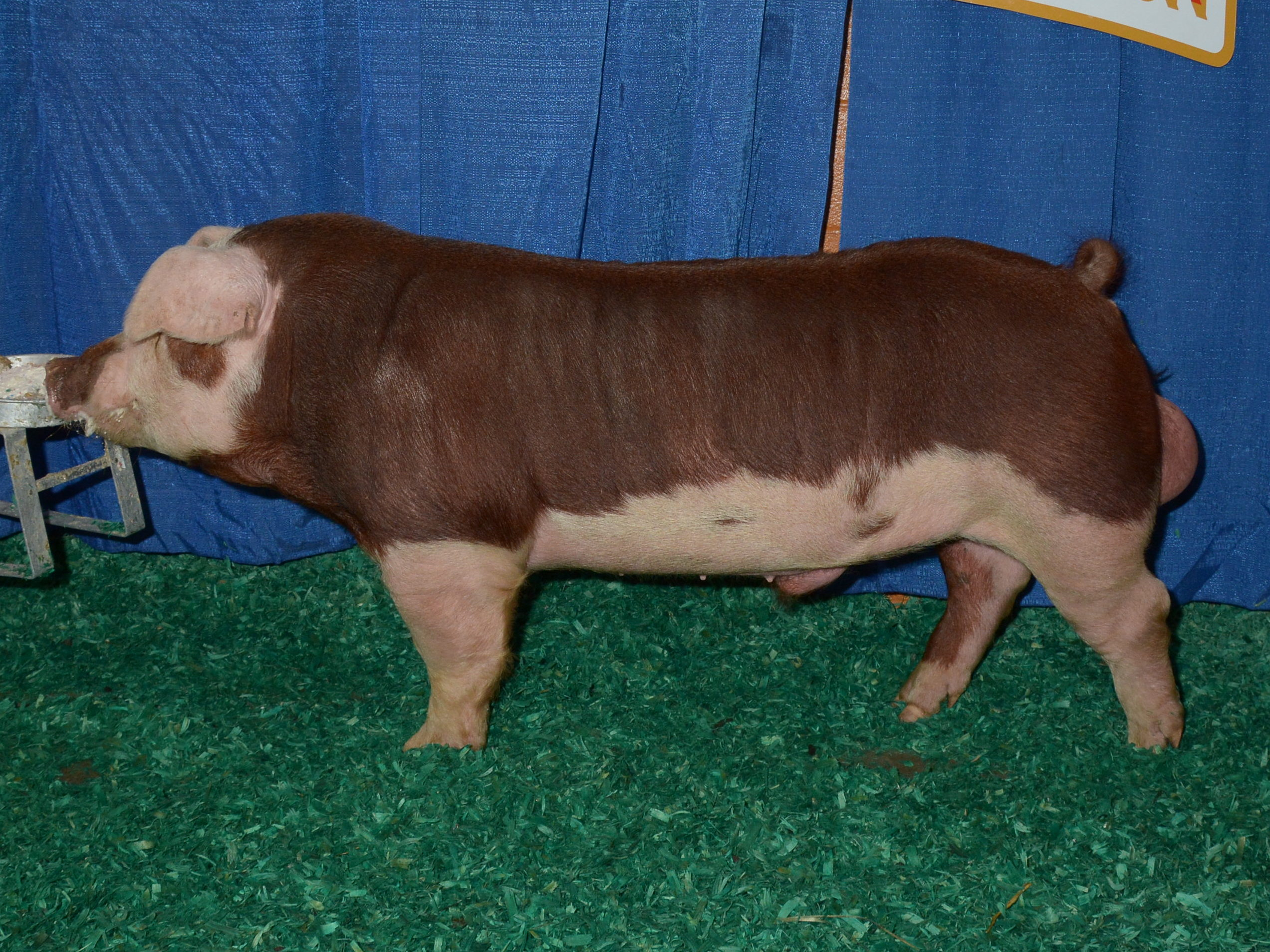
- A champion boar
- Conservation status: FAO (2007): not at risk; DAD-IS (2022): Livestock Conservancy (2022): recovering
- Other names: Hereford; White-faced
- Country of origin: United States

Traits
- Weight: Male: average 360 kg (800 lb); Female: average 270 kg (600 lb)

The Hereford Hog or Hereford is an American breed of domestic pig. It is named for its color and pattern, which is similar to that of the Hereford breed of cattle: red with a white face.

It is of medium size, with a curly tail and lop ears.

== History ==
The first person to breed for the Hereford color pattern in pigs – and the first to describe it – was R.U. Weber of LaPlata, Missouri. From about 1902 until 1925 a number of farmers in Nebraska and Iowa, among them John Schulte of Norway, Iowa, collaborated in the selection of pigs with this coloration. The principal breeds used were the Duroc and the Poland China; there may also have been some Chester White or Hampshire influence. They bred not only for color, but also conformation and performance. In 1934 a selection of the hundred best animals from five herds was made, and became the foundation stock for the breed. A breed society, the National Hereford Hog Registry Association, was formed in that year under the sponsorship of the Polled Hereford Cattle Registry Association, and a herd-book was opened.

The breed grew in numbers into the mid-twentieth century, particularly in Iowa, Illinois and Indiana, but from the 1960s, with the move of commercial pork operations to the modern system of three-way cross-breeding using American Yorkshire, Duroc and Hampshire, population numbers fell sharply.

In 2013 the American Livestock Breeds Conservancy (now the Livestock Conservancy) estimated that fewer than 2000 breeding animals remained, and listed the conservation status of the breed as 'watch'; in 2022 its estimate of breed numbers was unchanged, but the conservation status of the breed had changed to 'recovering'. The population reported to DAD-IS for 1970 is 317, while that for 2011, the most recent year listed, is 2045; in 2022 the conservation status of the breed was shown as 'unknown'.

== Characteristics ==
It is a pig of medium size: mature sows weigh about 270 kg (600 lb) and boars about 360 kg (800 lb). The only allowable coat coloration is a deep red-brown covering at least two thirds of the body, with a pale face, ears, underbelly, and socks. The ears hang forwards over the face.

It is hardy and docile, prolific and maternal, and suitable to either extensive or intensive management.

== Use ==
Hogs for market reach a slaughter weight of about 100 kg (220 lb) in five or six months.
