= Dutch Landrace =

Dutch Landrace (Dutch: Nederlands Landras, 'Netherlands Landrace') may refer any of at least the following breeds of livestock from the Netherlands:

- Dutch Landrace goat, a breed of goat
- Dutch Landrace pig, a breed of pig
