= Chato Murciano =

Breed of pig

- Country of origin: Spain
- Distribution: Murcia

Traits

The Chato Murciano is a breed of domestic pig originating from Murcia, Spain. It is the only surviving breed of pig locally and historically produced in Murcia and is at the risk of extinction. Despite its danger of becoming extinct, the Chato Murciano is a well-managed pig known for its production of bacon and lean pork. Several Spanish authorities specialising in agriculture work on programs aiming to conserve the breed by cross-breeding and artificial insemination

== History ==
In Murcia, the Spanish were in need of an improved breed of pig as the current Murcian type was not meeting their standards. To solve this problem, they mix-bred the Murciano with the Victoria, Tamworth, the Large White and the Berkshire, the Chato Murciano was and still is currently bred for its lean meat and bacon. There were about fifty thousand pigs of this breed in 1865 and more than 100,000 in 1929. The breed originated and was farmed in Murcia, a region in the south-eastern area of Spain. The pig received its name from the Spanish due to its short nose, with “chato” meaning “short-nosed”, and “Murciano” meaning “from Murcia”.

== Description ==
Along with its short nose, the breed usually has a black or white color and has small sized heads. Generally the head Chato Murciano can grow up to 28.5 cm long and 20 cm wide after reaching 12 years of age. This is only a 2–4 cm growth from when it is one year old. On its head, the snout increases size up to 10.5 cm but then decreases to about 9.5 cm when the pig reaches twelve years of age. Pigs at about 3.5 years or 12 years have their eyes separated from each other at about 16 cm where at 1 year, they are separated by 12.5 cm.

Although having white fur, black fur is a more common characteristic of the Chato Murciano but some tend to have white patches on parts of their body such as the tail and legs. These are believed to be inherited from the Berkshire, which is the pig the Spanish used to cross-breed with the primitive Murcian breed. Hair is found all over the pig’s body except on mammary glands belonging to the sow. There can be up to fourteen mammary glands on a Chato Murciano.

== Breeding and Use ==
Bacon and lean pork is mainly why the pig is bred but it is an advantage for farmers as the breed is well adapted to southern Spain’s dry and warm climate. Being fed raw materials that are locally gathered, Chato Murciano are mostly killed at 18 months when their weight is around 180 kg. Because of its substantial amount of fat with extensive levels of oleic acid and muscle pigmentation, sausages of higher quality are able to be produced according to several studies conducted in the past. In the 1980s, the breed was on the verge of extinction but due to programs instigated by agriculturists and governments, the pig is gradually becoming more sustainable.

== See also ==
- List of domestic pig breeds
- Berkshire (pig)
