= Belarus Black Pied pig =

Breed of pig

Belarus Black Pied
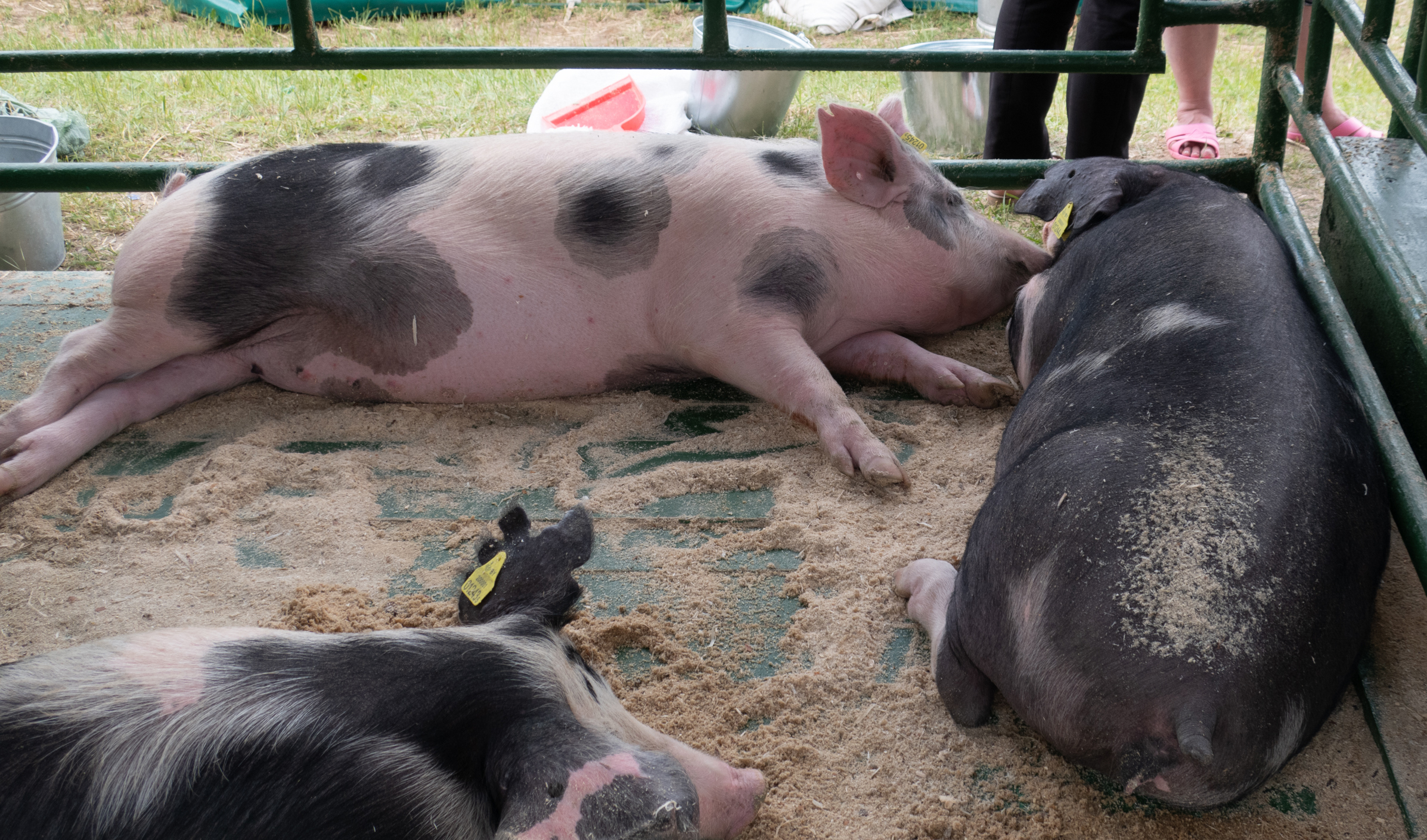
- Conservation status: Least Concern
- Other names: Byelorussian Black Pied, White-Russian Black Pied, Spotted Black Pied
- Country of origin: Belarus / Russian Empire

Traits

The Belarus Black Pied, also known as the Byelorussian Black Pied, the White-Russian Black Pied, and the Spotted Black Pied, is a breed of domestic pig from Belarus. It was originally crossbred in Minsk in the late 19th century from the breeding of Large White, Large Black, Berkshire, and Middle White pigs with native Belarus pigs. The Belarus Black Pied wasn't recognized as a separate breed group until 1957 and not as an individual breed until 1976.
