= Ukrainian White Steppe =

Ukrainian breed of pig

- Conservation status: FAO (2007): not at risk (international); DAD-IS (2022): endangered (local)
- Other names: Ukrainian: Українська степова біла порода; Ukrajinska stepowa bila poroda
- Country of origin: Ukraine, Soviet Union
- Distribution: Kherson Oblast, Ukraine; Mykolaiv Oblast, Ukraine; Odesa Oblast, Ukraine; Zaporizhzhia Oblast, Ukraine; Armenia; Azerbaijan; Moldova; Turkmenistan

Traits
- Weight: Male: 322 kg; Female: 238 kg

The Ukrainian White Steppe (Ukrainian: Українська степова біла порода, romanized: Ukrayinsʹka stepova bila poroda) is a Ukrainian breed of general-purpose pig. It was developed in the early twentieth century by M.F. Ivanov at the experimental farm of Askania Nova, in Kherson Oblast in southern Ukraine, at that time in the Soviet Union; it was the first Soviet pig breed to be developed. It derived from cross-breeding of pigs native to southern Ukraine with imported Large White boars. It was officially recognised in 1932.

== History ==
The Ukrainian White Steppe was developed in the early twentieth century by M.F. Ivanov at the experimental farm of Askania Nova, in Kherson Oblast in southern Ukraine, at that time in the Soviet Union; it was the first Soviet pig breed to be developed. It derived from cross-breeding of pigs native to southern Ukraine with imported Large White boars. It was officially recognised in 1932. It became one of the most numerous pig breeds of the Soviet Union: there were over 800 000 in 1964, and about 640 000 in 1980. In 2007 the population was reported to be 6 584; the FAO listed its international conservation status as "not at risk". In 2022 the reported population was 596, and the local conservation status was "endangered".

It was among the breeds used in the development of the Ukrainian Meat Pig, which was recognised in 1993.

== Characteristics ==
The Ukrainian White Steppe is closely similar to the Large White. It is rather more robust, and is better adapted to the climatic conditions of southern Ukraine than is the Large White.
