= British Lop =

British breed of pig

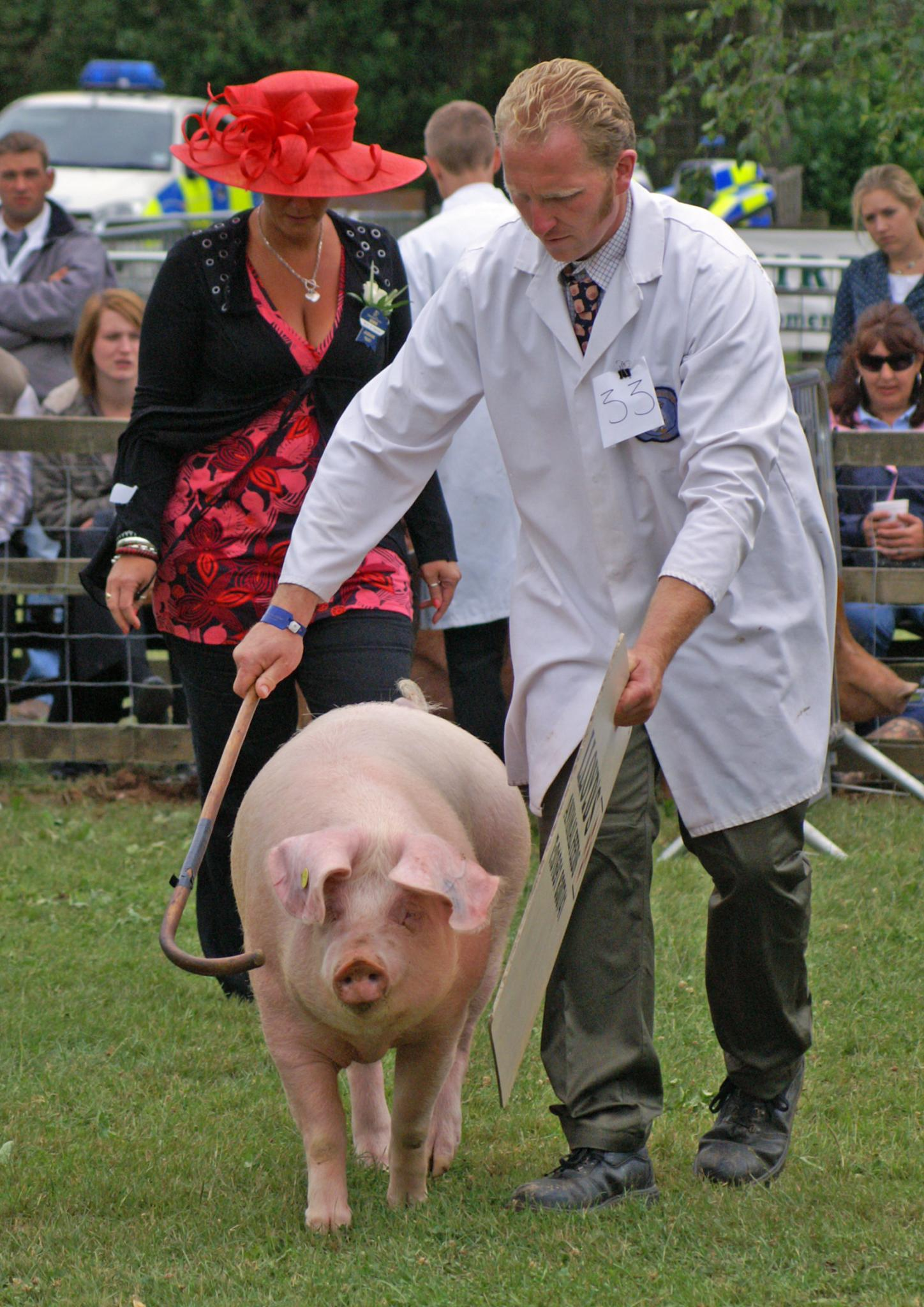
- Sow at the last Royal Show at Stoneleigh Park, 2009
- Conservation status: Rare breed
- Other names: Devon Lop; Cornish White; National Long White Lop-eared Pig; White Lop
- Country of origin: United Kingdom

Traits
- Weight: Male: 350 kg; Female: 300 kg
- Skin colour: unpigmented
- Hair: white

The British Lop is a traditional British breed of pig from the West Country of south-western England. It is a large, white-skinned pig with lop ears hanging forward over the face. It was formerly known as the Cornish White or Devon Lop and then, in the early twentieth century, as the Long White Lop-eared or White Lop; the modern name was adopted in the 1960s.

== History ==
The earliest records of the breed are from the border of Cornwall and Devon, particularly the area around Tavistock. It is possibly related to similar breeds found around the north-western fringes of Europe, namely the Welsh, with which it was for a period in the 1920s in a combined herd-book, and the Landrace pig breeds of Scandinavia. It may also be related to the Normande pigs of France.

The first herd-book was published in 1921, subsequent to the popularity of classes at the Devon County Show in that year. By the late 1930s large numbers of purebred Lops were registered, predominantly in the south-west. During the years after the Second World War, the British Government recommended that production be standardised on three breeds (the Large White, Welsh and Landrace) which led to a decline in the numbers of other breeds of pig. During the 1960s and 70s only around eleven breeders kept the British Lop going.

== Characteristics ==
The British Lop is a large, white-skinned pig with lop ears. It is heavy-set, and much deeper in the body than the similar Welsh or Landrace pigs. The breed was developed to be able to support itself primarily on grazing, and is still often raised outdoors. Unlike most surviving British pig breeds, the British Lop appears to have had little or no input from the imported Asian pigs used in much nineteenth-century breeding.

It has a good ability to put on lean weight and is particularly noted for a gentle temperament.

== Conservation status ==
In the twenty-first century, breed numbers are higher than they were in the 1960s and 1970s; in 2022–2023 the British Lop was one of the seven pig breeds listed as 'priority' – the highest level of risk – on the watchlist of the Rare Breeds Survival Trust. Clarissa Dickson Wright commented that "The British Lop is rarer than the Giant Panda."
