= Landrace pig =

Standardized breed of domestic pig

The term Landrace pig, or Landrace swine, refers to any of a group of standardized breeds of domestic pig, and in this context, the word "Landrace" is typically capitalized. The original breed by this name was the Danish Landrace pig, from which the others were derived through development and crossbreeding. The breed was so named because the foundation stock of the Danish Landrace were specimens from the local, free-breeding, non-pedigreed stock of swine, i.e., the regional landrace native to Denmark. The modern breeds are not themselves landraces, since they are formal breeds maintained through selective breeding rather than natural selection. The establishment and spread of the Danish breed gave the word "landrace" to the English language (it had already existed in Danish, German, Dutch, and some other Germanic languages). Sources from the mid-20th century often mean the Danish Landrace swine in particular when referring to "Landrace" pigs, as most of the others had not been developed yet.

== List of Landrace pig breeds ==
The most common Landrace pig breeds are:

- American Landrace pig
- Belgian Landrace pig
- British Landrace pig
- Bulgarian Landrace pig
- Canadian Landrace pig
- Danish Landrace pig
- Dutch Landrace pig
- Estonian Landrace pig (a.k.a. Estonian Bacon pig)
- Finnish Landrace pig
- French Landrace pig
- German Landrace pig
- Italian Landrace pig
- Norwegian Landrace pig
- Polish Landrace pig
- South African Landrace pig
- Swedish Landrace pig
- Swiss Landrace pig
