= Bulgarian White =

Breed of pig

- Conservation status: Least concern
- Country of origin: Bulgaria

Traits

The Bulgarian White is a breed of domestic pig from Bulgaria. It was originally created through a grading up breeding process that involved breeding Large Whites and Edelschwein lines with native Bulgarian pigs in the early twentieth century.

== History ==
In the early 1960s, the Bulgarian government wanted to improve the meat yield of the country's Bulgarian White stock. They did so by importing "3,000 pedigree breeding stock of the Landras and Large White varieties...from the USSR, Sweden, and Poland." These important pigs were given out to the pig farmers in the country, along with 10 state farms, in order to crossbreed them with local Bulgarian White stock.
