= Beijing Black =

Breed of pig

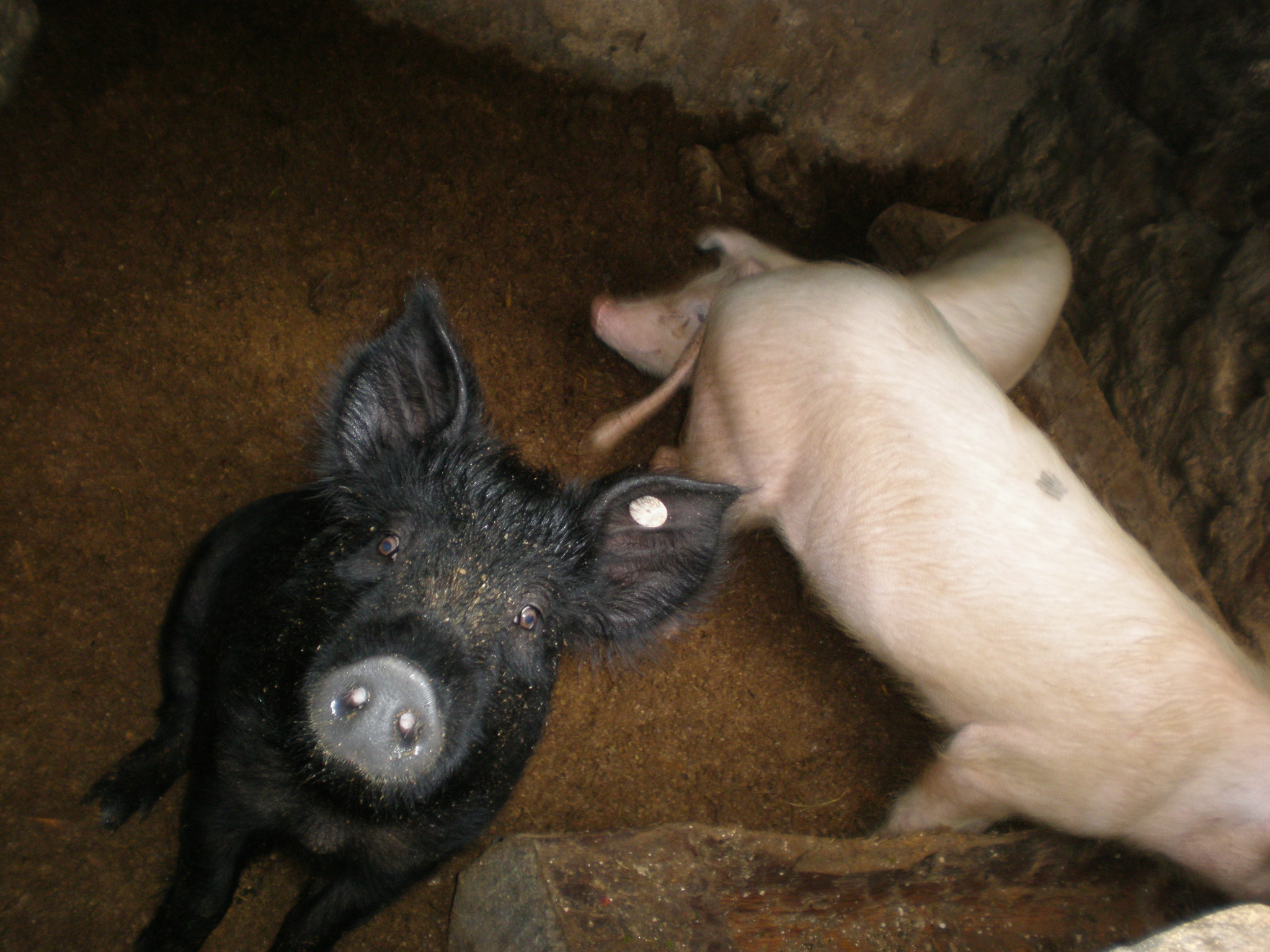
- Conservation status: Least Concern
- Other names: Peking Black
- Country of origin: China

Traits

Notes
- Cross-breed of Berkshire and common Chinese pig

The Beijing Black, also known as the Peking Black, is a breed of domestic pig from China. They are mostly black, but have some white markings. The breed was created in 1962 by cross-breeding a Berkshire with a common Chinese pig. Two other breeds, the Soviet White and the Yorkshire, were also crossbred with native Chinese pigs. It is described as being a "strong, rugged breed" that has "good production traits".

Breeds from which pigs are chosen to breed new litters have to match several factors, which include "litter size at birth and weaning, weight at weaning, and weight and back fat thickness at 6 months of age". The pigs that pass these requirements breed with Beijing Black pigs of other lines to create greater variety.
