= Myrhorod pig =

Breed of pig

Myrhorod
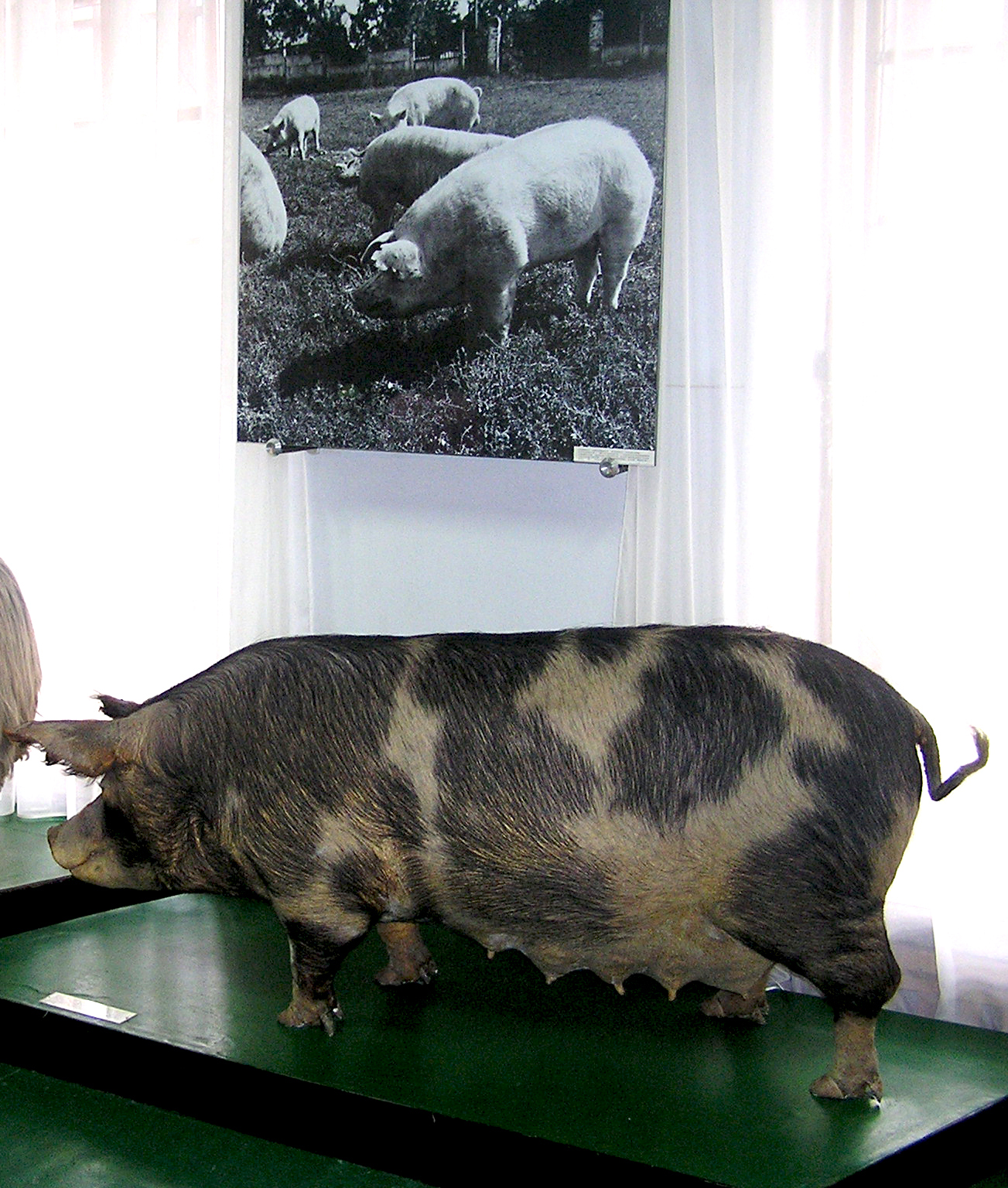
- Other names: Ukrainian: Mиpгopoдcькa; Myrhorodska
- Country of origin: Ukraine

Traits

The Myrhorod (Ukrainian: Mиpгopoдcькa, Myrhorodska) or Mirgorod, is a lard-type pig breed from Ukraine.
