= Mukota =

Zimbabwean breed of pig

- Country of origin: Zimbabwe

Traits

The Mukota, also known as the Rhodesian Indigenous or Zimbabwean Indigenous, is a breed of indigenous domestic pig found primarily in Zimbabwe. They have an estimated population of around 70,000 pigs, and are also found in Mozambique and Zambia. They are believed to have been introduced during trade with Europe and China in the 17th century, and are named after the Mukota region of Zimbabwe where they were first described in 1973.

Mukota pigs have a black coloration with no other patterning. They are adapted to the harsh climate in which they are found, needing only 6 liters of water per litter and are resistant to disease and heat. They are described to have two types, with one being short and fat with a short snout resembling that of the Meishan pig, and the other one closer to the Windsnyer, with a longer snout and similarity to a razorback.

Most farrowing occurs during the start of the rainy season in October or November. The age at a sow's first litter ranges from 6 to 12 months, with a litter size between 6.5 and 7.5 pigs. The carcass yield is about 30% less than from the Large White pig, but the meat is described as tasty and sweet.

Mukota pigs show more parasite tolerance compared to imported or Western varieties. A study evaluating parasite prevalence by veterinarians from the University of Fort Hare in South Africa and the University of Zimbabwe found moderate parasite infection in pigs from ten communal regions in Zimbabwe's Chirumhanzu district when compared to other varieties.
