= Ba Xuyen =

Breed of pig

- Conservation status: Least Concern
- Country of origin: South Vietnam

Traits

The Ba Xuyen is a breed of domestic pig from South Vietnam, specifically the Mekong Delta. It is a spotted black and white pig with white feet. It was bred from a cross between a Berkshire and a Boxu from 1932 to 1956.

== Description ==
The average size of the breed is 100 kilograms by the time they reach one year old, having a "backfat thickness of 42 mm." When breeding, around 8 piglets are born in every litter. Its skin color consists of black patches on white to pinkish skin. Its teeth are coated with enamel, which is similar to human teeth.

== See also ==
- List of pig breeds
- Vietnamese Pot-bellied
