= Taihu pig =

Breed of pig

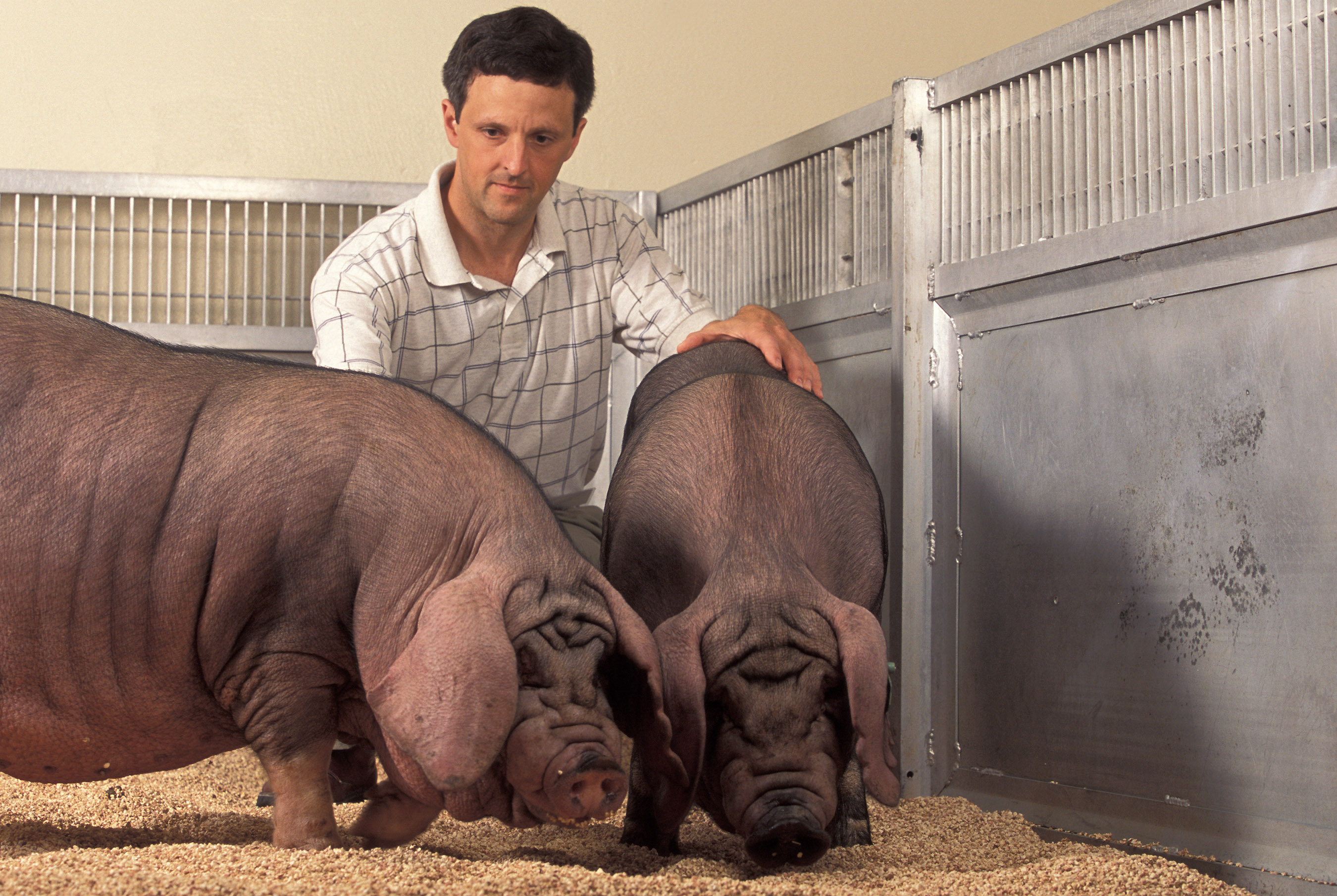
- Meishan pigs at the Meat Animal Research Center in Nebraska
- Country of origin: China

Traits

The Taihu pig (Chinese: 太湖猪) is a domestic breed of pig from the narrow region of mild sub-tropical climate around the Lake Tai region in the lower Yangtze River Valley of China. The breed is a large one, black in colour with a heavily wrinkled face. It has a large head with a broad forehead and large folded ears. The breed has a number of divisions, classified by some authors as strains and by others as separate breeds.

All the Taihu strains have a high rate of reproduction with litter sizes ranging up to twenty, but averaging fourteen live piglets. This characteristic, as well as their resistance to disease, has resulted in interest in the pigs for research into breeding and genetic engineering. Taihu pigs have been established in France, Albania, Hungary, Japan, the UK and the US.

== Taihu pig strains ==
There are usually four main groups of the Taihu pig identified and these are listed below. Although many others are named by authors, it is debatable whether there is any substantial genetic difference as some variation is due to diet and environment rather than genetics. Taihu are kept well-fed on a vegetable diet with large amounts of roughage, which sometimes leaves them short of calcium for bone development.

=== Meishan ===
The Meishan strain is mainly found in the Jiading District of Shanghai and the Taicang district in Jiangsu Province.

=== Fengjing ===
The Fengjing strain, named after the town of Fengjing, Shanghai, is mainly found in the Jinshan and Songjiang districts of Shanghai and the Wujiang District of Jiangsu Province.

=== Jiaxing black ===
The Jiaxing black strain is mainly found in the districts of Jiaxing City in Zhejiang Province.

=== Erhualian ===
The Erhualian strain is mainly found in the districts of Changzhou and Wuxi cities in Jiangsu Province.

=== Other named strains ===
Hengjing, named for a town in Suzhou City, Jiangsu Province, has been claimed extinct in 2019. Mi pig is found in Changzhou and Yangzhou cities of Jiangsu Province; and the Shawutou pig is found in Nantong City, Jiangsu Province.

== Research outside China ==
Interest has grown in Western countries in the possibility of using this pig in the female line of a breeding program with the hope that they can improve the taste, disease resistance and litter size while retaining the fast growth of Western breeds, possibly using genetic engineering techniques. 144 pigs, mostly various strains of Taihu, but also some Minzhu Pigs, were brought into the US in 1989 under a United States Department of Agriculture scheme with the University of Illinois and Iowa State University.
