= Chester White =

Breed of pig

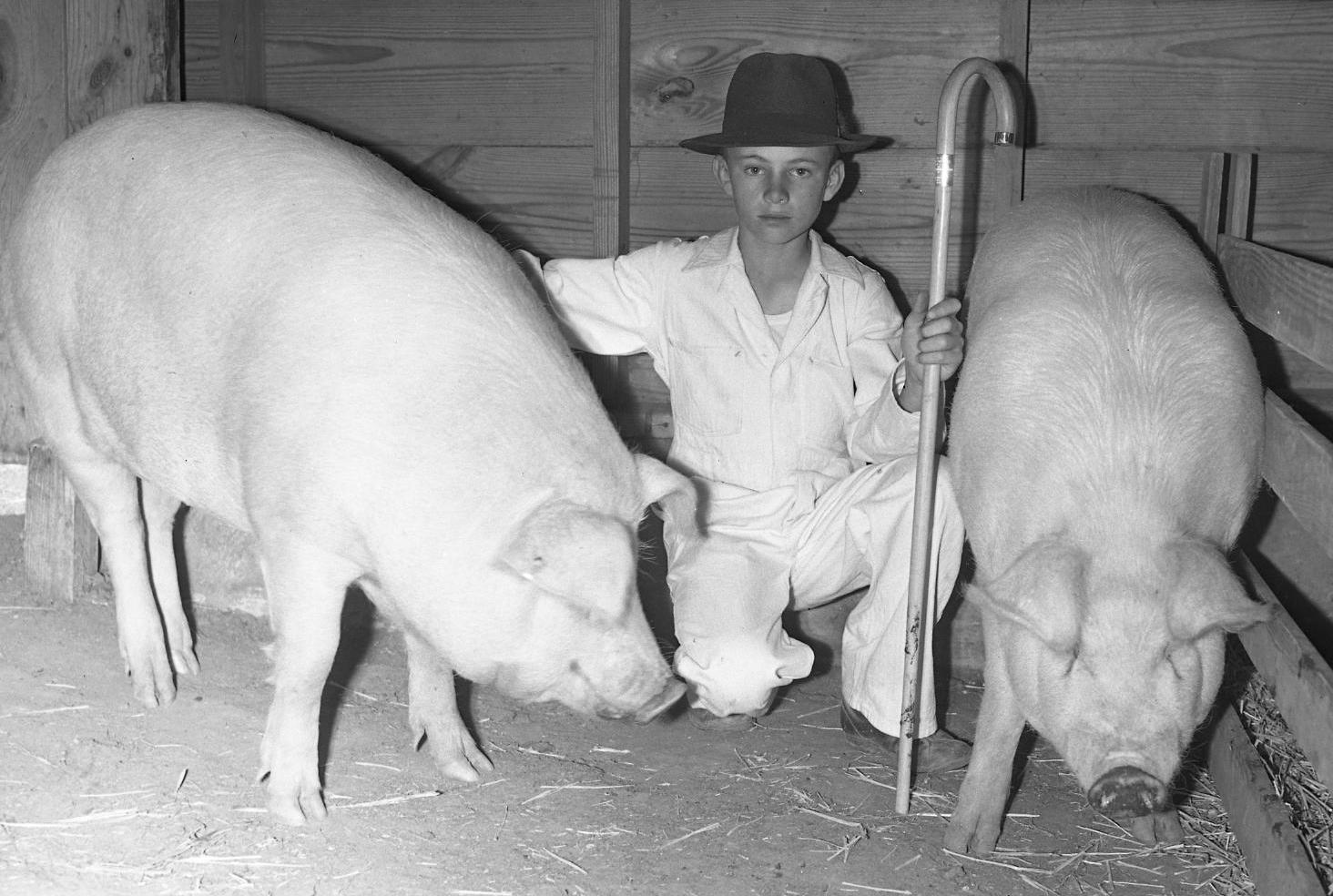
- A boy with two Chester Whites raised as part of 4-H in Texas (c. 1940)
- Country of origin: United States

Traits

The Chester White is a breed of domestic pig which originated in Chester County, Pennsylvania. It was formerly known as the Chester County White.

== History ==
The Chester White was first developed around 1815–1818, using strains of large, white pigs common to the Northeast U.S. and a white boar imported from John Russell Duke of Bedford, Bedfordshire county, England, referred to as the Woburn breed, brought by Captain Jefferies of Liverpool, England.

=== Breed associations ===
==== O.I.C ====
The "International Ohio Improved Chester Swine Record Association" was formed in 1891, and incorporated in 1895, in Yates County, New York. The breed was officially named the Ohio Improved Chester with OIC commonly used. The 51-member Board of Directors included members from Maine, Texas, Iowa, Michigan, New York, Wisconsin, Connecticut, Kansas, Ohio, Illinois, Missouri, Nebraska, North Carolina, California, New Jersey, Georgia, Pennsylvania, Florida, Arkansas, Kentucky, Indiana, and Santa Clara, Cuba. The association implemented the use of ear tags as early as 1895.

==== The Chester White Swine Record Association ====
In 1913, the American Chester White Record Association (1885) and the Standard Chester White Record Association (1890) combined to form the Chester White Swine Record Association.

In 1914, all breed organizations were consolidated under the Chester White Swine Record Association, an act which aided the spread of the breed into the rest of the country. Some historians conjecture that Chinese pigs were also added to the mix.

== Current ==
The Certified Pedigreed Swine Association (CPS) was formed in 1997, to combine the records of the Chester White, Poland China, and Spotted, into a central organization with individual state organizations being members.

The Chester White is not a versatile breed suited to both intensive and extensive husbandry. Though not as popular as the Duroc, Yorkshire, or Hampshire, the Chester White is actively used in commercial crossbreeding operations for pork. The Chester White is the most durable of the white breeds; it can gain as much as 1.36 pounds (0.62 kg) a day and gain 1 pound (0.45 kg) for every 3 pounds (1.4 kg) of grain it is fed. Their pale color leaves Chester Whites prone to sunburn; they must be given access to shade in the summer.

== See also ==
- List of domestic pig breeds
