= Urzhum pig =

Breed of pig

Urzhum
- Other names: Russian: Уpжумcкaя; Urzhumskaya
- Country of origin: Russia

Traits

The urzhum, also known as Urzhumskaya, is a breed of pig used for its meat originating from the Kirov region in Russia. They are a large breed with long, white bodies, strong legs, heavy ears that are slightly tilted forward, and thick bristles along their body. The meat is primarily used in the production of bacon. Urzhum pigs’ high-quality, reliable meat is integral to the pork production and supports the economic success of pork in the region.

This breed first appeared in Urzhum, Russia, for which it got its name, during the late 1950’s as part of a breeding program to create a breed to thrive in the local climate while also yielding quality meat. It is known for being hardy and robust while also having a prized quality of meat. The breed became officially recognized as unique in 1957.

== Reasons for Success ==
=== Meat Production Advantages ===
The breed is considered a prime example of the success of the pig breeding program in the region. It was derived from breeding local kinds of pig with the large white breed. It is praised for its meat yields with an average weight of 250 kilograms. Boars of the breed have a weight of 320 kilograms. The time taken to gain 100 kilograms of mass is around 206 days. Body lengths of adults vary between 155 centimeters to 190 centimeters across females and males. The breed also boasts high meat quality in terms of tenderness, juiciness, and flavor.

=== Advantages Outside of Meat ===
Another major reason why this breed is seen as a success is because of the various advantages outside of meat production. They are highly adaptable and resilient, helping them withstand extreme climates. The sows of the breed have good mothering ability and high fertility with litters tending to have between 12 and 15 kids. Urzhum pigs are adapted to digesting the feed given to them due to the conditions of their location. It is also adaptable to various conditions of husbandry, making them suitable for intensive and extensive farming practices.

== Breeding Facts ==
As of 1980, the breed’s population was 107,300 with 39,900 purebreds. The Urzhum is bred to be improved in 7 breeding farms and 2 breeding centers for raising and crossbreeding to improve growth rate and meat quality.
