= Latvian White pig =

Breed of pig

Latvian White
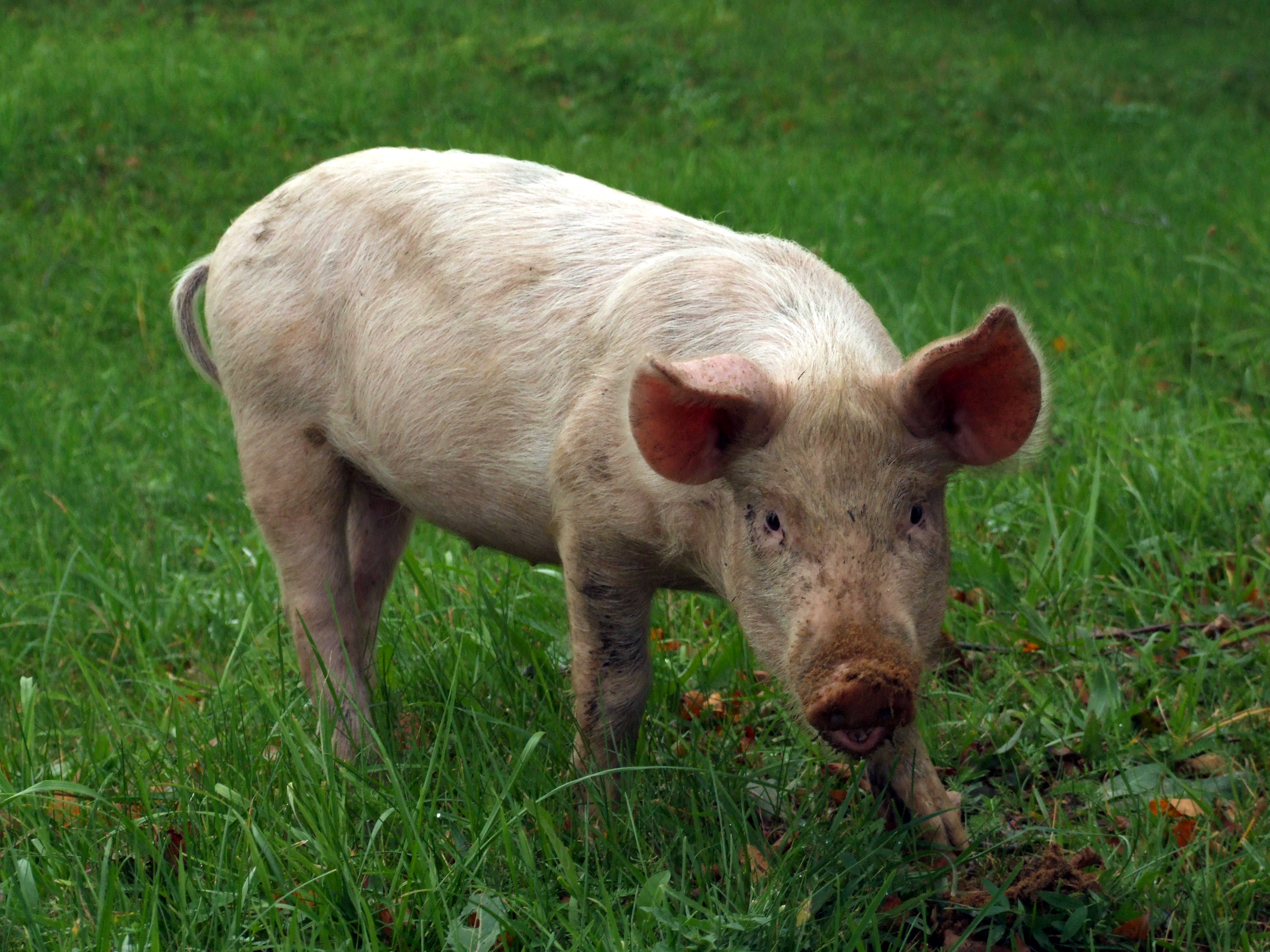
- Other names: Latvian: Latvijas baltā
- Country of origin: Latvia

Traits

The Latvian White (Latvian: 'Latvijas baltā') is a breed of pig from Latvia. They have prick ears.
