= Forest Mountain pig =

Breed of pig

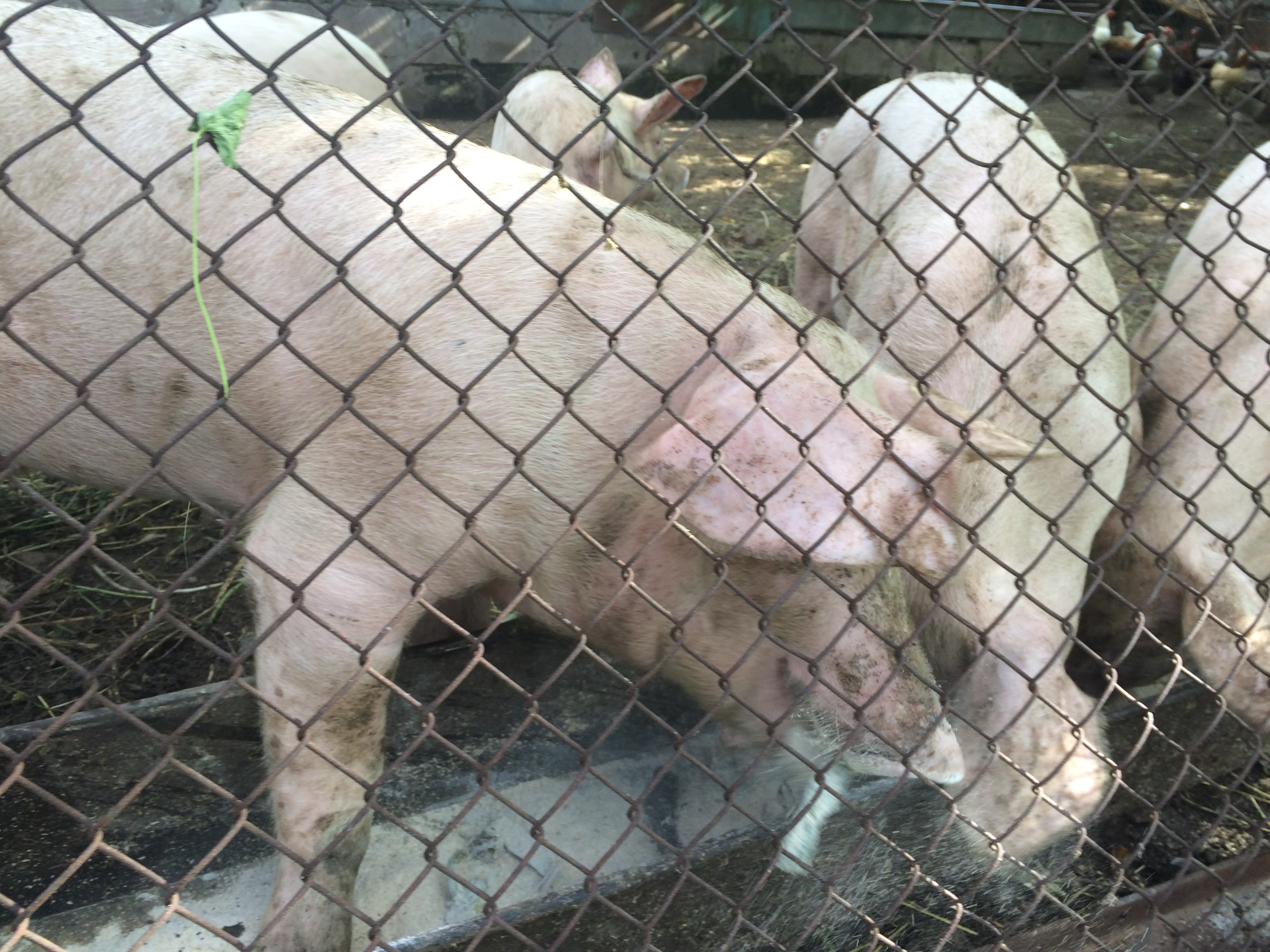

The Forest Mountain pig (Russian: Лecoгopнaя, Lesogornaya) is an extremely rare breed of pig from Armenia. It is feared that it may die out.
