= Producer (agriculture) =

Producer of agricultural products

Producer, in United States agricultural policy, is generally thought of as a farm operator. However, given the sometimes complex ownership and rental arrangements of today’s farms, the 2002 farm bill (P.L. 101–171, Sec. 1001) defines a producer for purposes of farm program benefits as an owner-operator, landlord, tenant, or sharecropper that shares in the risk of producing a crop and is entitled to a share of the crop produced on the farm. Under this definition, a landlord receiving cash rent is not considered a producer and is not eligible to receive subsidy program payments. However, a landlord receiving crop share as rent is a producer.
