= Piétrain =

Belgian breed of domestic pig

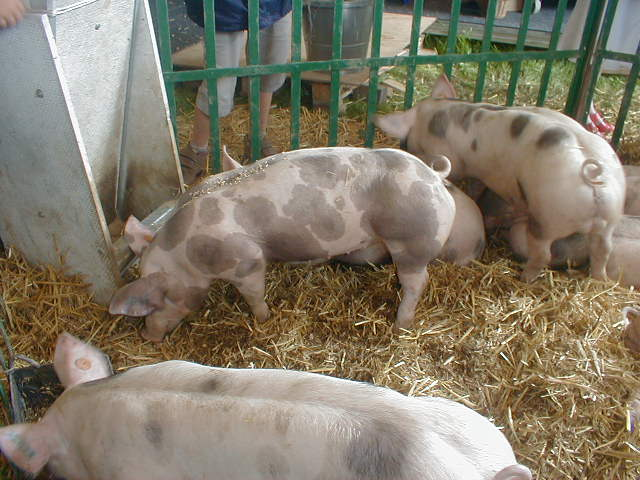
- At an agricultural fair in Libramont-Chevigny
- Conservation status: FAO (2007): not at risk; DAD-IS (2023): not at risk
- Country of origin: Belgium
- Distribution: over 40 countries
- Use: meat, cross-breeding

Traits
- Weight: Male: 300 kg; Female: 280 kg
- Height: Male: 90 cm; Female: 85 cm
- Hair: piebald – greyish white ground, dark spots ringed with pale grey-blue

Piétrain (French pronunciation: [pjetʁɛ̃]) is a Belgian breed of domestic pig. It is native to Wallonia, and takes its name from the village of Piétrain in the municipality of Jodoigne in Walloon Brabant, in northern Wallonia. It first appeared in about 1920, and received recognition as a breed in 1950. Its origins are not clear; it has been suggested that the farmers of Piétrain may have recognised, and selectively bred for, a genetic mutation causing muscular hypertrophy.

From about 1960, the Piétrain was also reared in Germany, principally in Baden-Württemberg, Nordrhein-Westfalen and Schleswig-Holstein; it is used as a sire for cross-breeding.

In the 1980s and 1990s, researchers at the faculty of veterinary medicine of the Université de Liège used cross-breeding with stress-resistant Large White stock to develop a Piétrain strain without the gene for porcine stress syndrome (also called malignant hypothermia), to which the original stock was particularly susceptible.

== Characteristics ==
The Piétrain is a large pig with heavy muscling, particularly on the hams. It is fairly short in the leg and has a stocky appearance. The head is fairly short and not heavy, with forward-pointing semi-lop ears and a straight profile. The coat is piebald, with a greyish white ground on which are dark spots ringed with pale grey-blue.
