= Livny pig =

Breed of pig

Livny
- Other names: Russian: Ливенcкaя; Livenskaya
- Country of origin: Russia

Traits

The Livny (Russian: Ливенcкaя, Livenskaya) is a general purpose pig breed from Russia.

The Livny Pig is an indigenous meat and fat-type breed farmed in a single farm in the Orel region, located in the Central European part of the Russian Federation.

The Livny pig developed from local pigs through cross breeding different breeds such as the Large White, Berkshire and Poland China, and was recognized in 1949.

The Livny pig conformational characteristics are: a relatively short and wide head with dished face; large, thick and slightly drooping ears; wide, straight and sometimes arched back; wide and deep chest; ample bone; strong legs; rough skin sometimes with wrinkles; much hair growing evenly all over the body. The colour is white or black pied; some animals are red-pied or black.

The breed has several distinguishing characteristics such being highly adaptable to different weather conditions and feeding conditions, and by having a high meat quality.
