= Tsivilsk pig =

Breed of pig

Tsivilsk
- Other names: Russian: Цивильскaя; Tsivilskaya
- Country of origin: Russia

Traits

The Tsivilsk (Russian: Цивильскaя, Tsivilskaya) is a pig breed from Russia.
