= Ankamali pig =

Breed of pig

Ankamali Pig
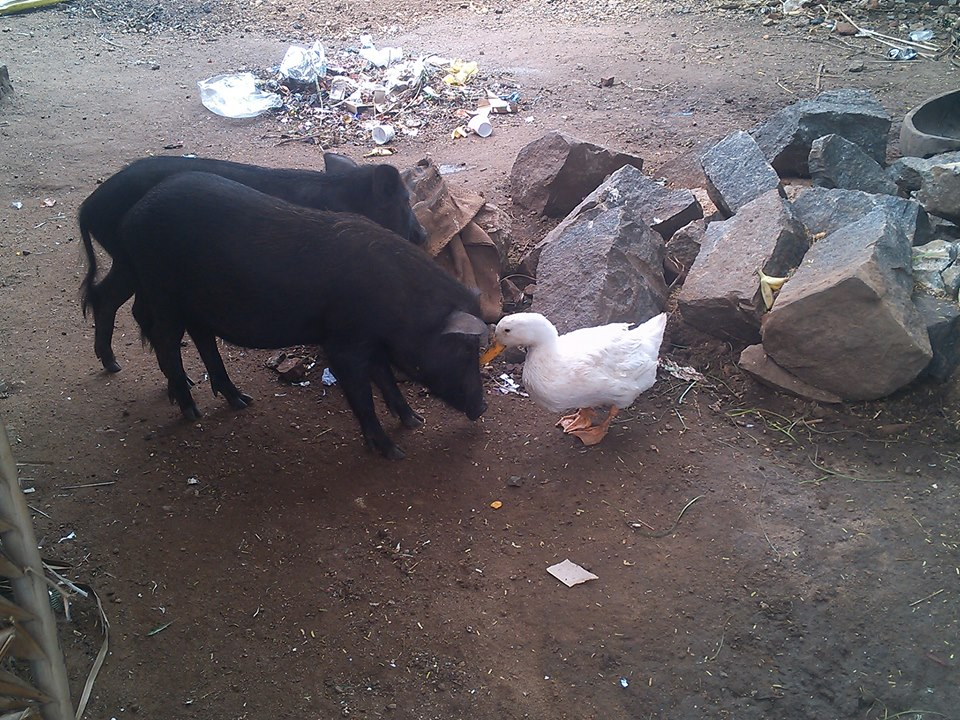
- Conservation status: endangered
- Country of origin: India
- Distribution: Kerala

Traits

Ankamali Pig is an indigenous breed of pig found in Kerala, India. This black pig of Kerala is now seen as an endangered breed.
