= Ukrainian Spotted Steppe =

Breed of pig

- Other names: Ukrainian: Українська степова ряба порода Ukrajinska stepowa ryaba poroda
- Country of origin: Ukraine

Traits

The Ukrainian Spotted Steppe (Ukrainian: Українська степова ряба порода, Ukrajinska stepowa ryaba poroda) is a lard-type pig breed from Ukraine.

== Literature ==
- Українська степова ряба порода свиней. // Українська радянська енциклопедія: [у 12-ти т.] / гол. ред. М. П. Бажан; редкол.: О. К. Антонов та ін. — 2-ге вид. — К. : Головна редакція УРЕ, 1974–1985. (in Ukrainian)
