= Swedish Landrace pig =

Breed of pig in Sweden

Swedish Landrace
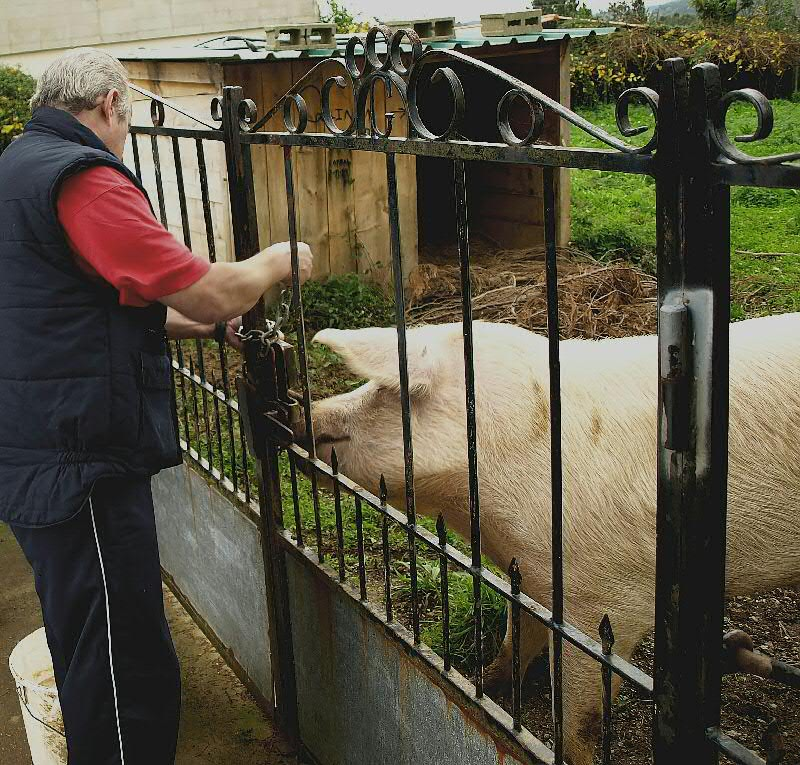
- Country of origin: Sweden

Traits

The Swedish Landrace is the leading breed of pig in Sweden. They have heavy drooping ears and a white coat. The Swedish strain of the Landrace pig originated from importations from neighboring countries, particularly Denmark. The Swedish Landrace have attracted attention in the United States and other nations in recent years.

== Characteristics ==
The Swedish Landrace was largely derived from the Danish Landrace and has similar characteristics. It is a medium-to-large pig with a long body. It is white, and is scantily clad with short hairs. The snout is long, and the large ears droop forwards. It has a long back and deep flanks and lacks the wrinkles and excess fat found in some other breeds. However the Swedish Landrace is not such an extreme bacon-pig, and breeders have concentrated on the soundness of the legs and feet, the strength of the back and the animal's constitution. They have also sought to retain the fecundity, prolificacy, mothering ability and rate of weight gain of the Danish Landrace.

== Exports ==
The Swedish Landrace has been exported to the United States and elsewhere. It finds favour in countries where fresh pork is desired and other manufactured products, whereas the Danish Landrace is bred for bacon. It has been used in the improvement of the American Landrace and to broaden that breed's genetic base. It was exported to Australia in the first half of the twentieth century and on from there to New Zealand in 1959. Another export market was Russia, and it was also exported to Czechoslovakia, where it was largely used for crossing to improve the local livestock.

== See also ==
- List of domestic pig breeds
