= Estonian Bacon =

Breed of pig

- Country of origin: Estonia

Traits

The Estonian Bacon (Estonian: eesti peekon) is a meat pig breed from Estonia. It was developed from a local landrace by crossbreeding it with German, Danish and Swedish landraces. Its appearance looks similar to the Danish Landrace.

== See also ==
- List of domestic pig breeds
