= North Caucasian pig =

Breed of pig

North Caucasian
- Other names: Russian: Ceвepoкaвкaзcкaя; Severokavkazskaya
- Country of origin: Russia; Uzbekistan

Traits

The North Caucasian (Russian: Ceвepoкaвкaзcкaя, Severokavkazskaya) is a general purpose pig breed from Russia and Uzbekistan.
