= Dutch Landrace pig =

Breed of pig

Dutch Landrace
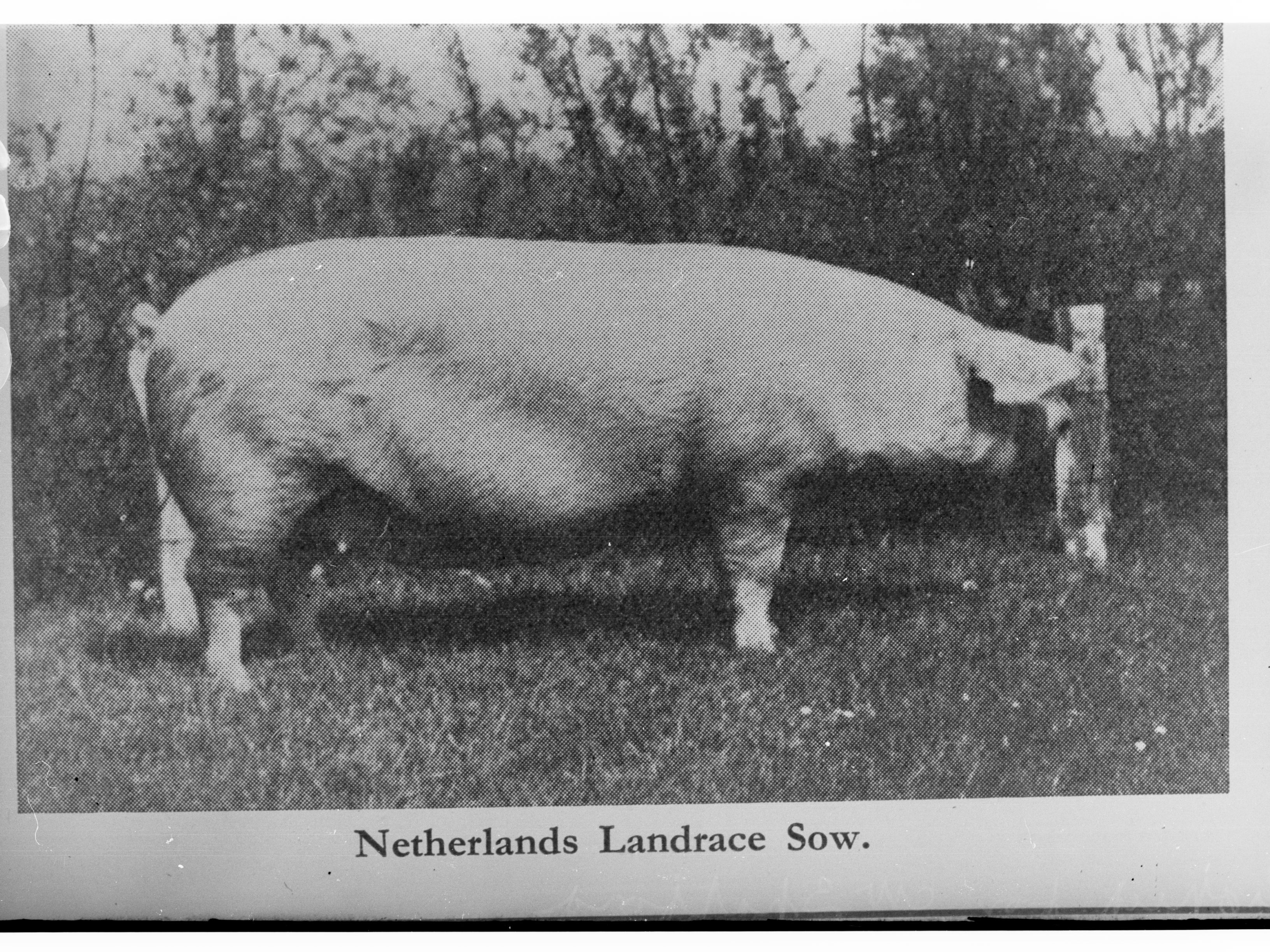
- Dutch Landrace sow, photograph from about 1915
- Other names: Netherlands Landrace, Nederlands Landras
- Country of origin: Netherlands
- Distribution: Netherlands, Spain, Japan
- Use: Meat

Traits
- Skin color: White

Notes
- It is a crossbreed with other Landrace-named breeds of Europe.

The Dutch Landrace pig (Dutch: Nederlands Landras) is a standardized breed of domestic pig originating in the Netherlands. The breed was developed from the native landrace of pigs of the area, crossbred with strains from neighboring counties. The Dutch Landrace is considered "a meaty and efficient breed". The breed is unusually responsive to the halothane test, which can be used to weed out individuals with low projected survivability and meat production.

== Populations ==
The Dutch Landrace is found mostly in the south, east and north of the Netherlands. The Centraal Bureau Voor de Varkensfokkerij ('Central Bureau for Pig-breeding'), in Nijmegen, serves as the breed registry. The breed is exported, especially to Spain and Japan.

== Traits ==
Dutch Landrace pigs are similar to those of the other "Landrace"-named breeds of Europe. They are white, and have large, drooping ears. However, they are wider-backed and have heavier hams than some other Landrace strains. These latter two traits are stronger in individuals that are heterozygous for the halothane-responsive gene. The breed has high fertitility and strong maternal abilities. At four test stations throughout the Netherlands, the Centraal Bureau tests over 1,000 Dutch Landrace litters per year, for conformation ("desirable carcass characteristics"), and for the rate and meat-to-fat ratio (economy) of their weight gain.

== Breeding and crossbreeding ==
Whether a boar can be used as a stud for artificial insemination is controlled by the Centraal Bureau, through testing of progeny, boar sire performance, and conformation.

The Dutch strain of the "Landrace" pig breeds originated, as its name suggests, from the native landrace of pigs in the Netherlands, plus controlled crossbreeding with German Landrace and Danish Landrace pigs.

=== Dutch Yorkshire pig ===
Dutch Landrace sows are the bulk of the female stock for a standardized three-way cross, the Dutch Yorkshire pig, a 3/4 Large White (a.k.a. Yorkshire) and 1/4 Dutch Landrace mix, developed with "great stress on production detail", by the following breeding formula: Large White boar × (Large White boar × Dutch Landrace) sow.

== Responsiveness to the halothane test ==
A 1978 study showed that Dutch Landrace pigs are especially responsive – compared, for example, to the Dutch Yorkshire crossbreed – to the halothane-induced malignant hyperthermia test (halothane test, for short), which can be used to weed out specimens with high susceptibility to stress and likely abnormal meat quality. Dutch Landraces are responsive 22% of the time (vs. 3% for Dutch Yorkshires), and those responsive to the test are almost ten times likelier to die during the fattening period than responsive Dutch Yorkshires. Two 1980 follow-up studies by the same team of researchers found that the Dutch Landrace's susceptibility is inherited as "a single recessive autosomal trait", and "[t]he gene for this trait affects production traits", including carcass and meat quality. Three genotypes (genetic strains) have been identified in the breed: Heterozygous for (carrying but not expressing) the gene, and homozygous either for (expressing) the gene, or not possessing it at all. The heterozygous has an intermediate carcass and meat quality and a selection advantage. The homozygous for reactivity to halothane had lowest meat quality, though highest meat production of the three genotypes, and as noted in the first study, its high reactivity level can be used for screening. It also has the lowest percentage loss at slaughter. Halothene-reactive castrated males, as opposed to un-modified boars, differed from non-reactive in "all carcass and meat quality traits", and had "significantly lower feed conversion ratios". Halothene reactivity seems to be more heritable from the sire than the dam; in a population with an average 24.9% of individuals being reactive, 40.7% of those with reacting sires were themselves reactive, vs. 21.3% without.

== See also ==
- List of domestic pig breeds
