= Meishan pig =

Chinese breed of pig

Meishan
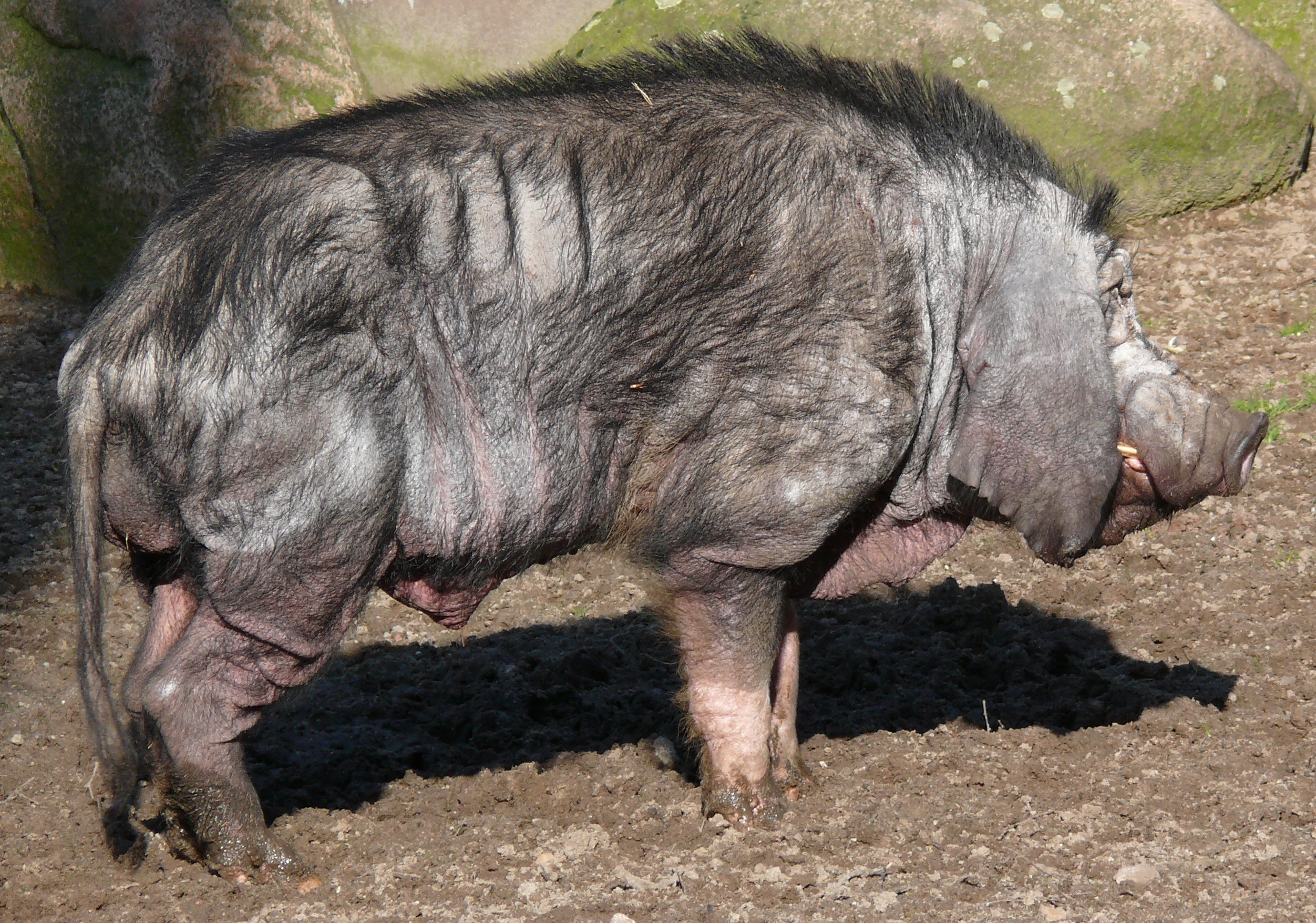
- Boar
- Country of origin: China

Traits

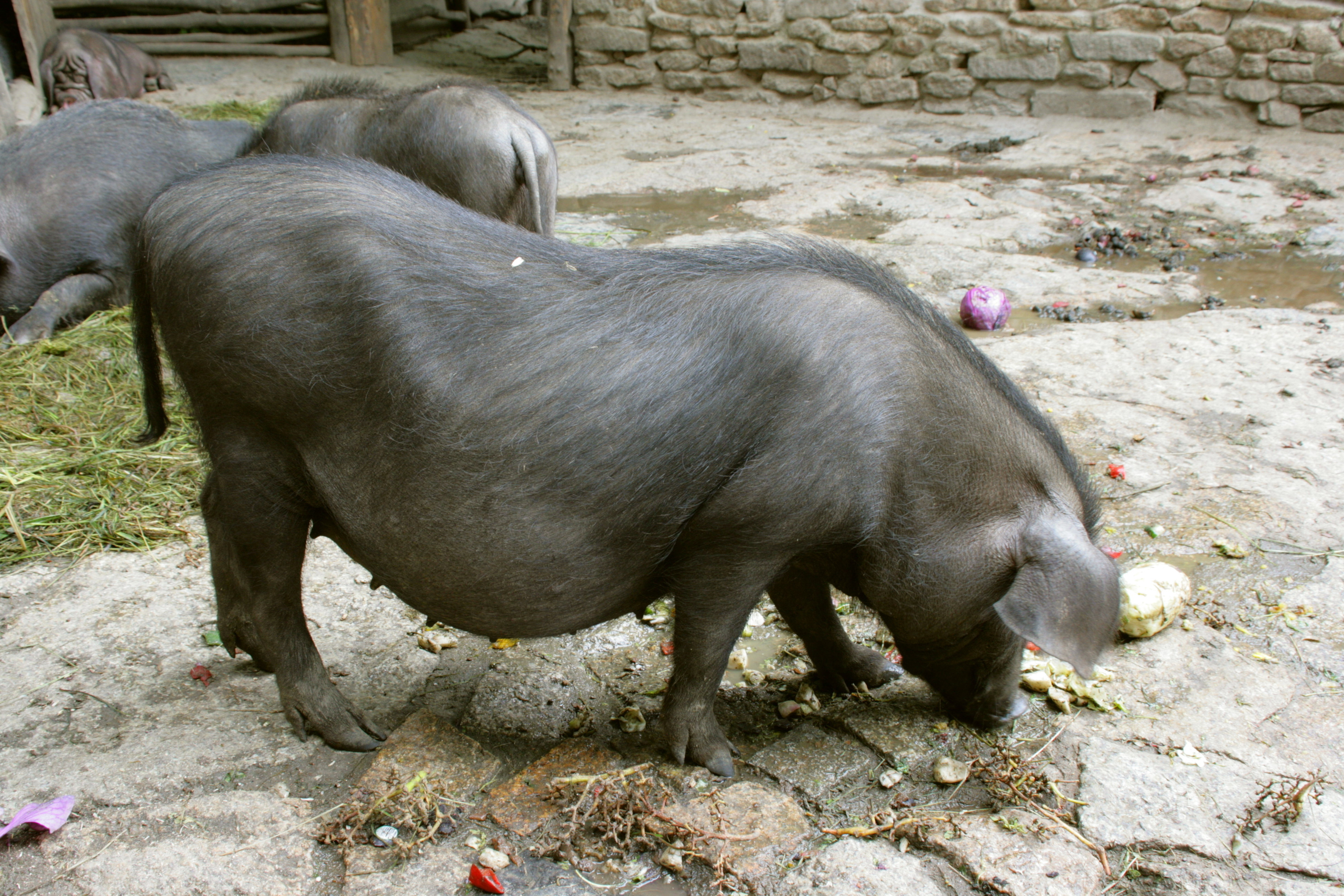
Sow in Tierpark Görlitz

The Meishan (Chinese: 梅山猪) is a Chinese breed of domestic pig. It is named for Meishan County in Jiangsu Province. It is a sub-group of the Taihu and is a small- to medium-sized pig with large drooping ears and wrinkled black skin.

Native to Southern China, the breed is best known for its large litters of 15-22 piglets. Due to its fecundity, it was imported to the United States in 1989 by the USDA Agricultural Research Service. All US research on the Meishan pigs was terminated in 2016 and the remaining pigs were dispersed to US farmers. In 2018 the Meishan Pig was declared critically endangered worldwide by the Livestock Conservancy. The Meishan Pig is the focus of a major conservation effort involving the Livestock Conservancy and the American Meishan Breeders Association.
