= American Yorkshire =

American breed of pig

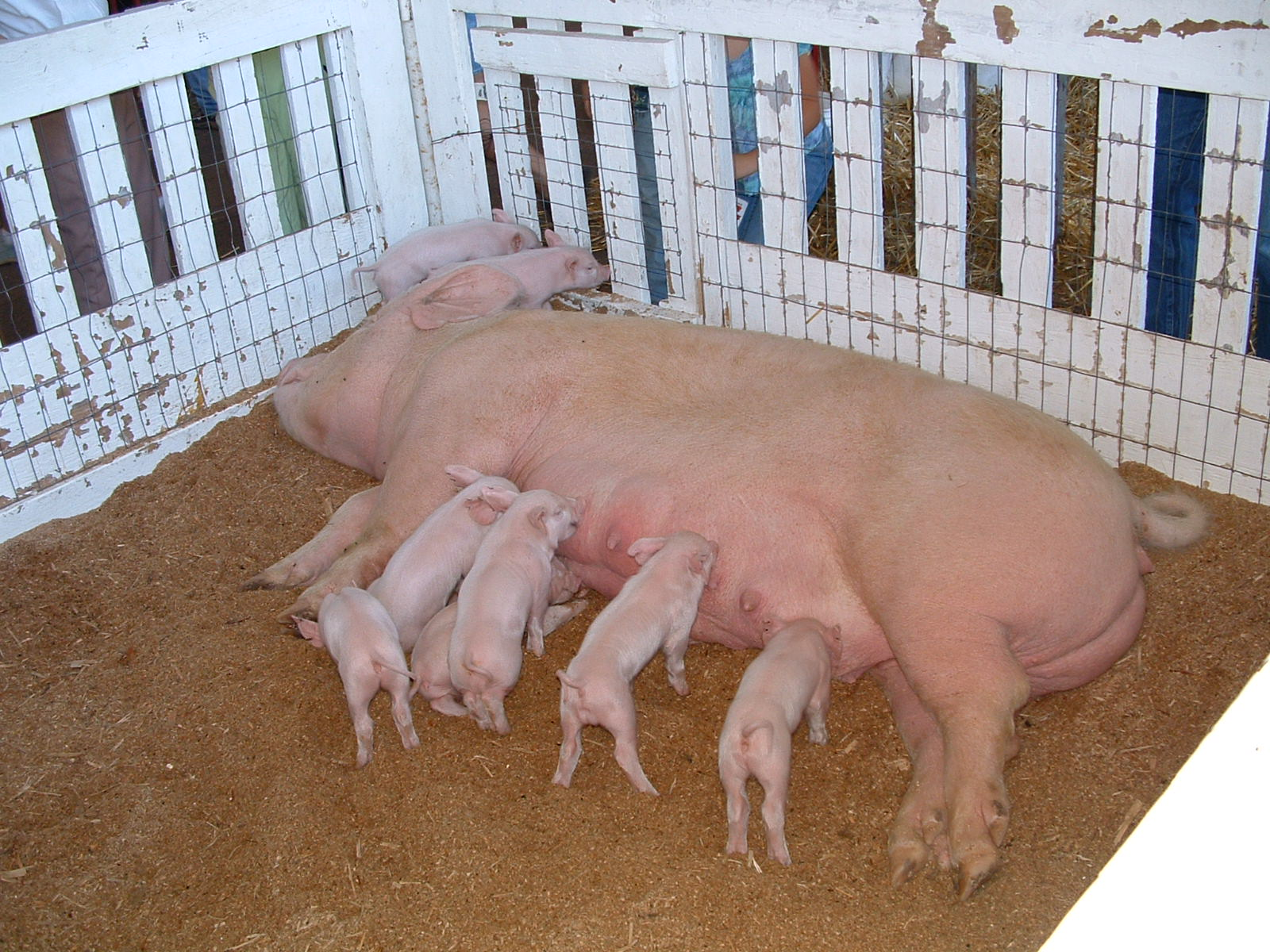
- At the Oregon State Fair
- Conservation status: FAO (2007): not listed; DAD-IS (2022): not at risk
- Country of origin: United States

Traits

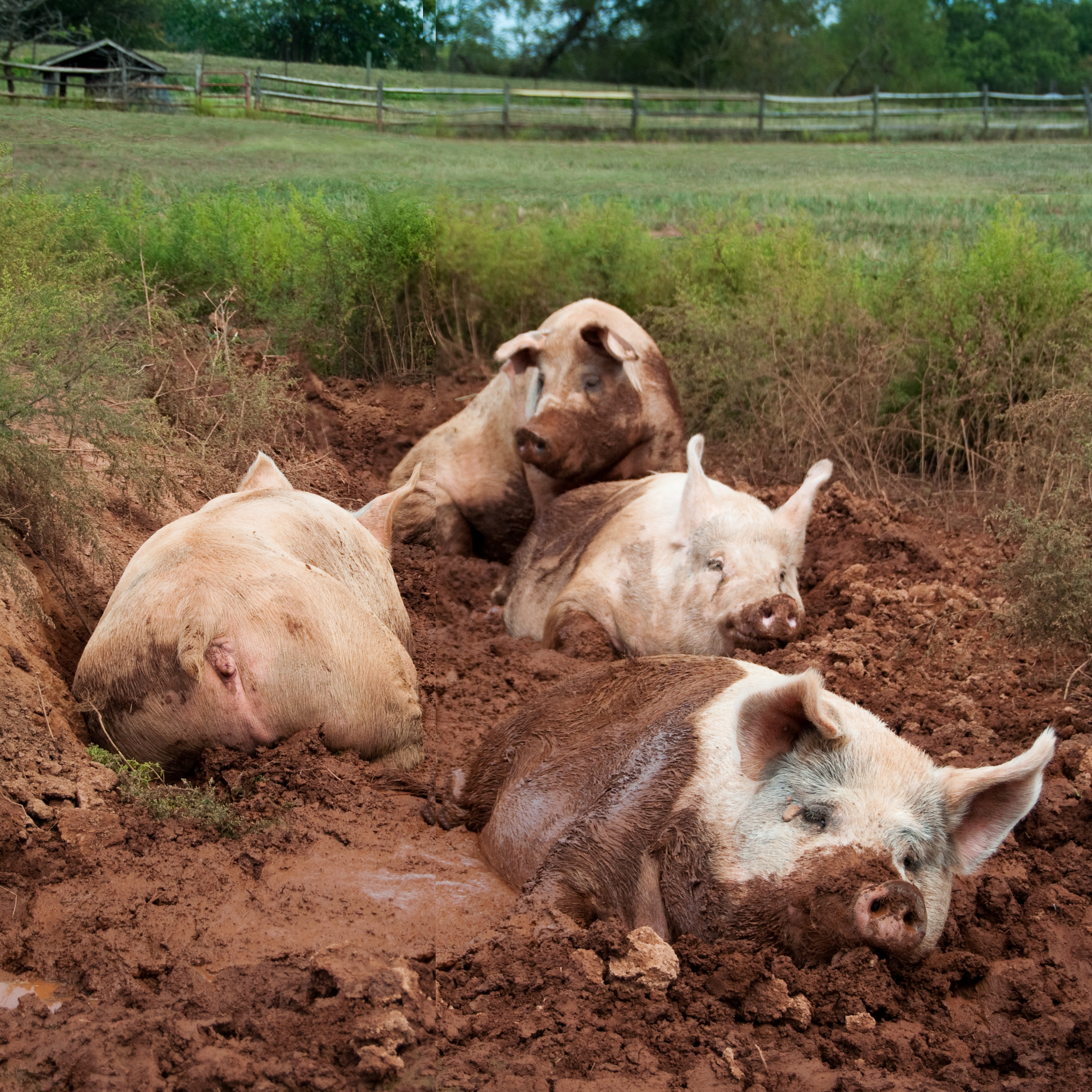
Wallowing in mud

The American Yorkshire is an American breed of large domestic pig. It is the most numerous pig breed in the United States. It derives from pigs of the British Large White or Yorkshire breed imported from the United Kingdom or from Canada at various times from about 1830 to the mid-twentieth century.

== History ==
The Yorkshire was the traditional pig of the county of the same name in northern England. Some pigs were imported under this name to the United States in about 1830. They were large and white, and – untypically – had large lop-ears; some of them at least may in fact have been from Lincolnshire rather than Yorkshire. Within a short time these were seen in Minnesota and, under a variety of names, in Ohio.

A stock company with the name American Yorkshire Club was started in St. Paul, Minnesota, in 1893, (Note: It was re-organised as a breed association in 1948, and the office moved to Valparaiso, Indiana) and a herd-book was begun. The first volume of this, published in 1901, listed 1264 animals; of these, approximately 40% were of the Small Yorkshire breed of small pig. The first boar registered in the new herd-book had been imported from Canada, purchased from the Ontario Agricultural College; Canada was the source of most Yorkshire imports at this time. The third edition of the herd-book in 1906 held animals registered in thirty-nine different states; the fifth edition of 1915 listed over 5300 pigs, of which only a handful were of the Small Yorkshire or Middle Yorkshire breeds.
