= Methylindole =

A variety of isomers of methyl indole derivatives are known:

- 1-methylindole
- 2-methylindole
- skatole (3-methylindole)
- 4-methylindole
- 5-methylindole
- 6-methylindole
- 7-methylindole
