= C9H9N =

The molecular formula C_{9}H_{9}N (molar mass: 131.17 g/mol) may refer to:

- 1-Methylindole
- 2-Methylindole, or methylketol
- 5-Methylindole
- 7-Methylindole
- Skatole, or 3-Methylindole
