= Spotted (American pig breed) =

American breed of pig

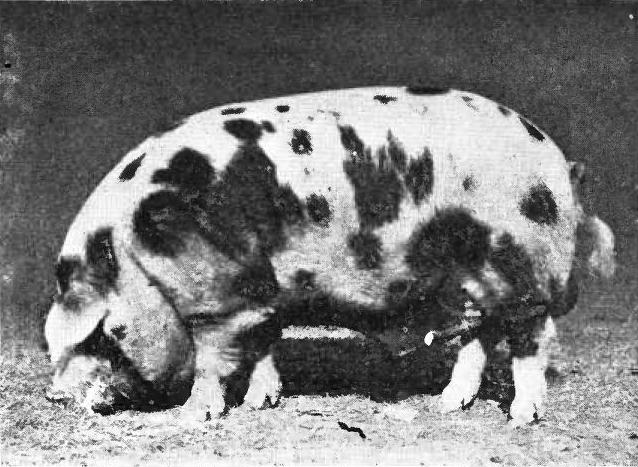
- Conservation status: FAO (2007): not at risk; DAD-IS (2026): not at risk; TLC (2026): not listed
- Other names: Spot; Spotted Poland China; Spotted Poland; Spotted Swine
- Country of origin: United States
- Use: meat

Traits
- Hair: black with white spots or white with black spots

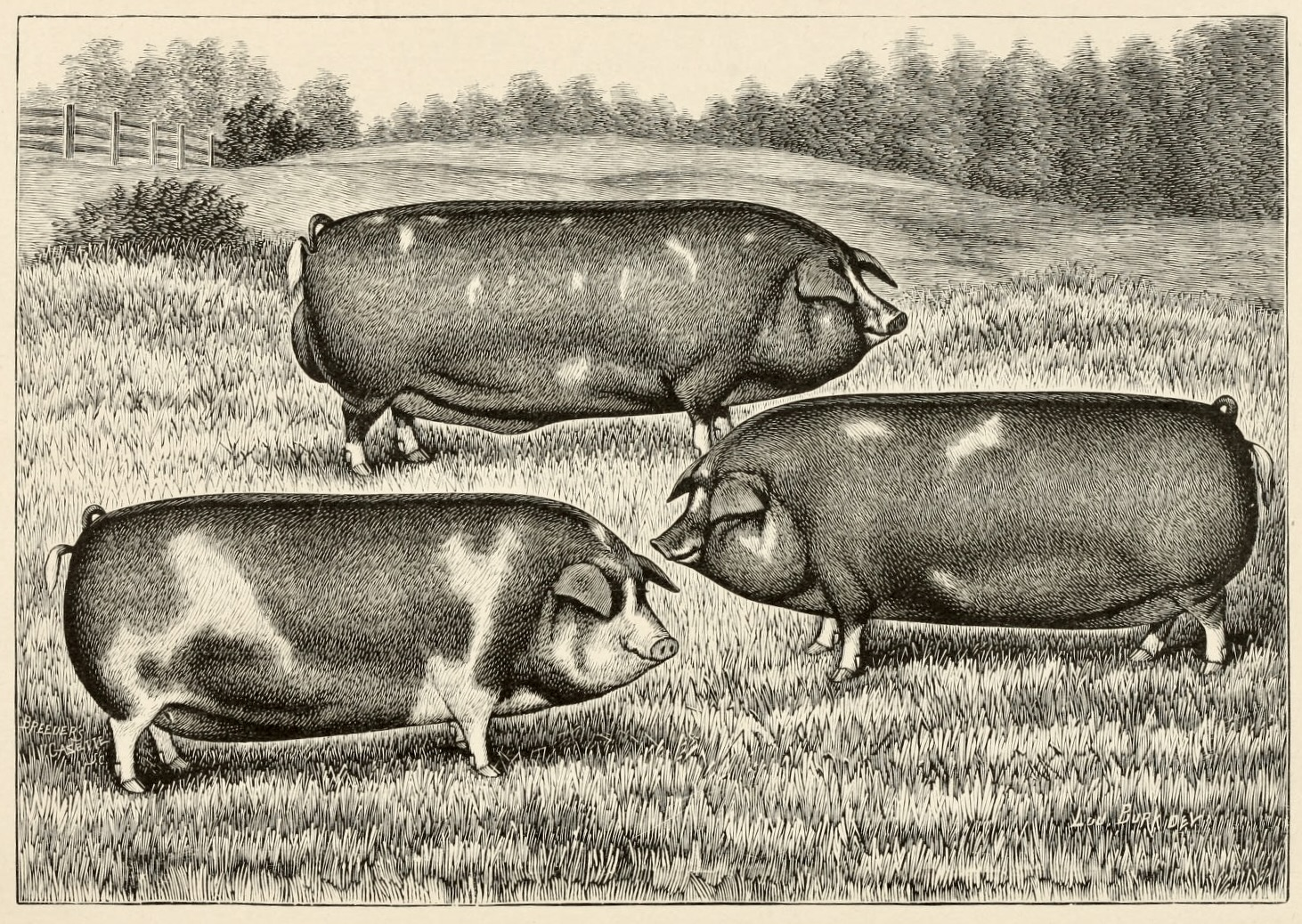
Six-month-old Poland China boar and sows showing white spotting, illustration from 1887

The Spotted is an American breed of domestic pig. It was bred in Indiana in the early twentieth century, and a breed society was formed in 1914. It shares much of its history with the Poland China of Ohio, and until 1960 was known as the Spotted Poland China.

There were almost 20000 of the pigs in 2024. The breed is not considered endangered, and is not included in the Heritage Breeds Watchlist of the Livestock Conservancy.

== History ==
There were about 64000 new registrations in the herd-book in 1990; at about the same time it was the fourth-most numerous pig in commercial agriculture, after the three dominant breeds, the Duroc, the Hampshire and the American Yorkshire.

The total population in the United States was reported in 2024 at just under 20000 head. The largest population world-wide is in Argentina, where there are almost 40000 of the pigs; the breed is also present in Canada, in Japan and in Uruguay.

== Characteristics ==
The Spotted is black and white, ideally in roughly equal proportions; it may be either black with well-defined spots or patches of white, or white spotted or patched with black. In morphology it is closely similar to the Poland China: it is a large pig with drooping ears and a slightly dished facial profile. Body weights are approximately 350 kg for sows and over 400 kg for boars.
