= Sugar Mountain Farm =

Pig farm in Topsham, Vermont, United States

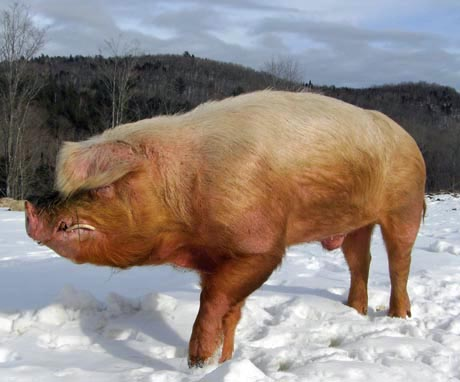
- Yorkshire x Berkshire Boar Big'Un at Sugar Mountain Farm
- Location: Topsham, Orange County, Vermont
- Coordinates: 44°07′31″N 72°20′24″W
- Region served: New England
- Products: Pastured Pigs & Sheep
- Owner: Walter Jeffries
- Website: sugarmtnfarm.com
- Remarks: 1,000 acres (400 ha) (forested); 70 acres (28 ha) (pasture)

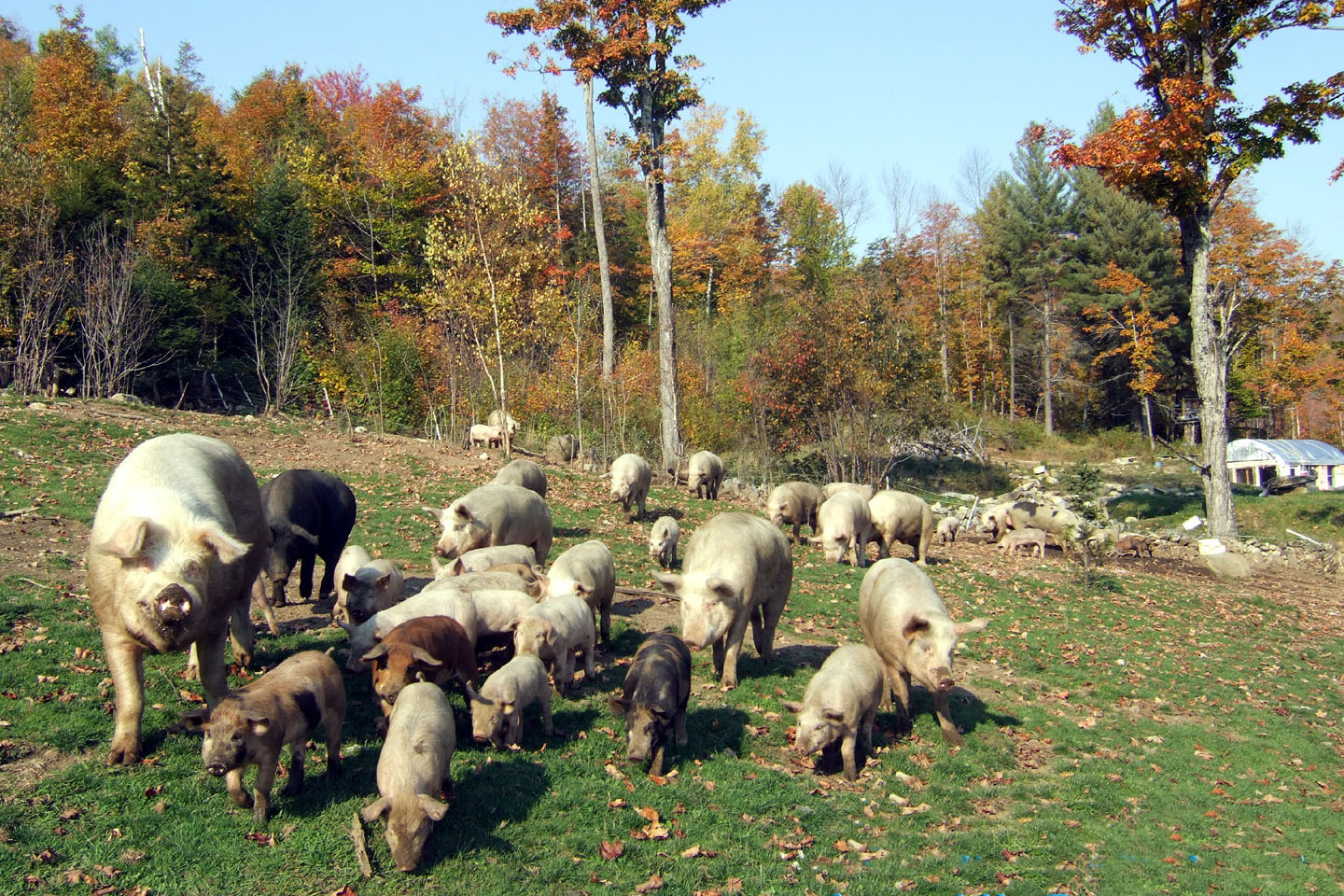
Pastured pigs at Sugar Mountain Farm

Sugar Mountain Farm is a 70 acres (28 ha) family-operated pig farm in West Topsham, Vermont with approximately 200-400 pastured-raised pigs. The pigs are fed acid whey from a nearby dairy farm, apple pomace leftovers from a nearby cider facility, vegetables, and spent barley from a brewery as opposed to grain.

The company has stated that it uses "natural farming methods", also known as permaculture. They only use antibiotics if a pig gets sick. The farm does not use castration to control boar taint, relying on other methods such as selective breeding, diet, and pasturing males away from females. They raised sheep and pigs until 2009, when the farm focused on pork due to lower demand for lamb and wool.

As of 2010, the farm had been raising pigs for 12 pig generations in two herds of 40 sows and four boars. The herds comprise crosses of several heritage breeds. Most are Yorkshire crossed with Berkshires, Large Black, Tamworth, Hampshire and Gloucester Old Spots.

Initially the farmers had to transport six pigs at a time 150 miles (240 km) to the nearest butcher. Using funding from friends, family members, their own savings, a community-supported agriculture programs of pre-buys by customers and $33,000 from a Kickstarter campaign, they began building a slaughterhouse on the property around 2009, as a do-it-yourself project. Sugar Mountain Farm started butcher shop operations October 15, 2015 under Vermont state inspection.

In 2019, the farm faced potential fines in excess of $100k from the state for failure to properly enclose pigs.

== See also ==
- Agriculture in the United States
- Vermont Agency of Agriculture Food and Markets
