= Sugar Mountain =

Sugar Mountain may refer to:

- Sugar Mountain (North Carolina), a mountain in North Carolina
  - Sugar Mountain, North Carolina, the village in Avery County named after the mountain
- Sugar Mountain Farm, Vermont
- Sugar Mountain (album), by Jack River, 2018
- Sugar Mountain (film), a 2016 film
- "Sugar Mountain" (song), by Neil Young
- Sugar Mountain (2005 film), written and directed by Aaron Himelstein

== See also ==
- List of mountains named Sugarloaf
