= Feces =

Solid or semisolid remains of undigested food

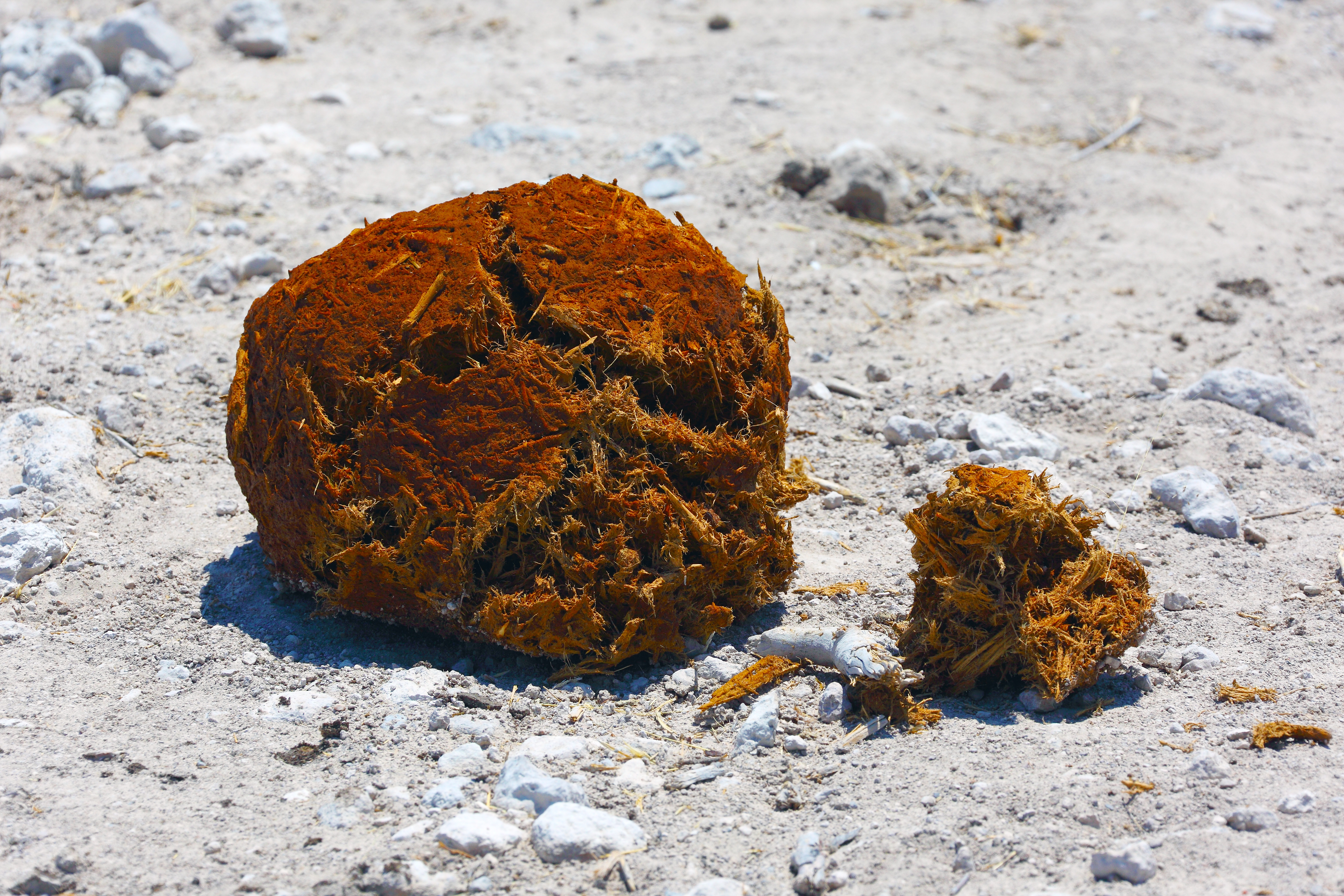
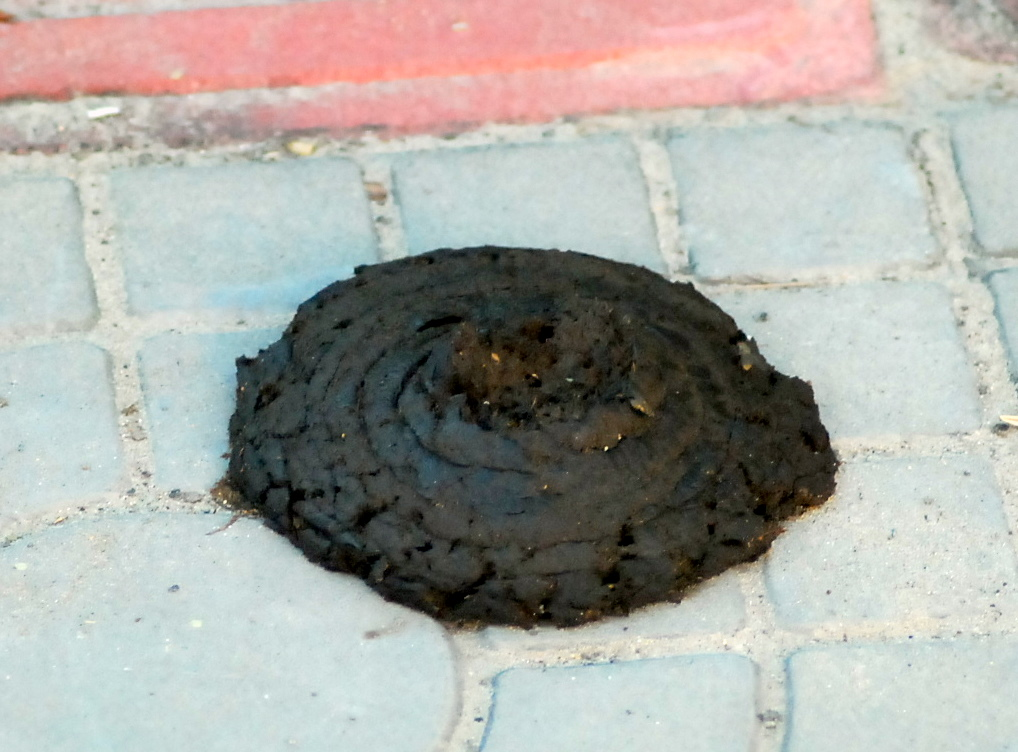
A comparison of elephant (left) and cow feces (right)

Feces (also faeces, fæces, poop, or poo) are the solid or semi-solid remains of food that was not digested in the small intestine, and has been broken down by bacteria in the large intestine. Feces contain a relatively small amount of metabolic waste products such as bacterially altered bilirubin and dead epithelial cells from the lining of the gut.

Feces are discharged through the anus or cloaca during defecation.

Feces can be used as fertilizer or soil conditioner in agriculture. They can also be burned as fuel or dried and used for construction. Some medicinal uses have been found. In the case of human feces, fecal transplants or fecal bacteriotherapy are in use. Urine and feces together are called excreta.

== Characteristics ==
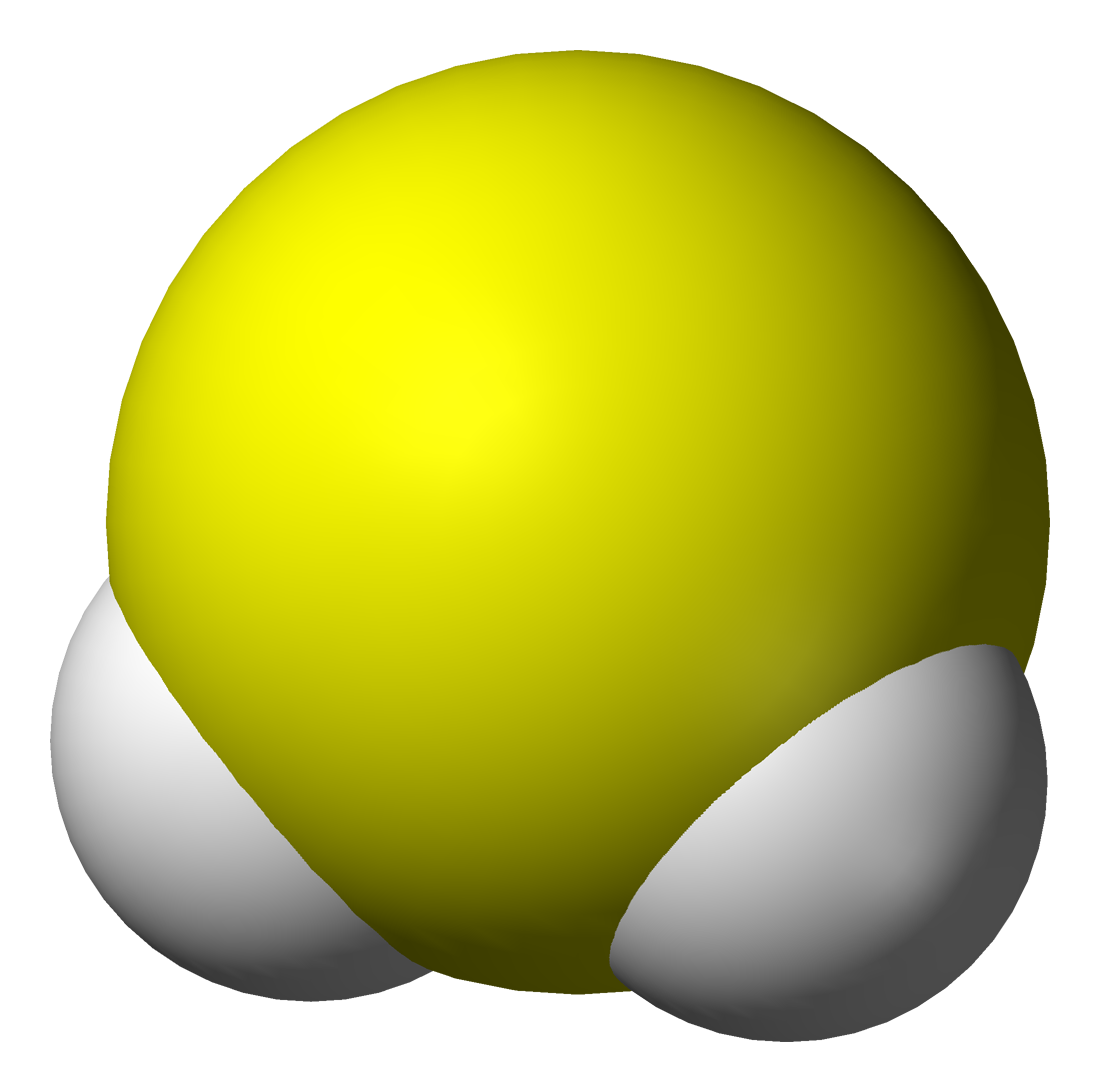
The molecule hydrogen sulfide contributes to the smell of feces.

The distinctive odor of feces is due to skatole, and thiols (sulfur-containing compounds), as well as amines and carboxylic acids. Skatole is produced from tryptophan via indoleacetic acid. Decarboxylation gives skatole.

The perceived bad odor of feces has been hypothesized to be a deterrent for humans, as consuming or touching it may result in sickness or infection.

=== Physiology ===
Feces are discharged through the anus or cloaca during defecation. This process requires pressures that may reach 100 millimetres of mercury (3.9 inHg) (13.3 kPa) in humans and 450 millimetres of mercury (18 inHg) (60 kPa) in penguins. The forces required to expel the feces are generated through muscular contractions and a build-up of gases inside the gut, prompting the sphincter to relieve the pressure and release the feces.

== Ecology ==
After an animal has digested eaten material, the remains of that material are discharged from its body as waste. Although it is lower in energy than the food from which it is derived, feces may retain a large amount of energy, often 50% of that of the original food. This means that of all food eaten, a significant amount of energy remains for the decomposers of ecosystems.

Many organisms feed on feces, from bacteria to fungi to insects such as dung beetles, who can sense odors from long distances. Some may specialize in feces, while others may eat other foods. Feces serve not only as a basic food, but also as a supplement to the usual diet of some animals. This process is known as coprophagia, and occurs in various animal species such as young elephants eating the feces of their mothers to gain essential gut flora, or by other animals such as dogs, rabbits, and monkeys.

Feces and urine, which reflect ultraviolet light, are important to raptors such as kestrels, who can see the near ultraviolet and thus find their prey by their middens and territorial markers.

Seeds also may be found in feces. Animals who eat fruit are known as frugivores. An advantage for a plant in having fruit is that animals will eat the fruit and unknowingly disperse the seed in doing so. This mode of seed dispersal is highly successful, as seeds dispersed around the base of a plant are unlikely to succeed and often are subject to heavy predation. Provided the seed can withstand the pathway through the digestive system, it is not only likely to be far away from the parent plant, but is even provided with its own fertilizer.

Organisms that subsist on dead organic matter or detritus are known as detritivores, and play an important role in ecosystems by recycling organic matter back into a simpler form that plants and other autotrophs may absorb once again. This cycling of matter is known as the biogeochemical cycle. To maintain nutrients in soil it is therefore important that feces returns to the area from which they came, which is not always the case in human society where food may be transported from rural areas to urban populations and then feces disposed of into a river or sea.

== Environmental impacts ==
=== Fecal resistome ===
The "fecal resistome" refers to the entire gene pool found in human and animal feces responsible for conferring antimicrobial resistance. Antibiotics taken by humans and animals primarily leave the body through feces and urine, which contain antibiotic resistance genes (ARGs) that act as an environmental pollutant. These contaminants spread throughout the environment via agricultural processes, such as manure application, and human wastewater systems. When contaminated feces enter new ecosystems, their microbial population fosters horizontal gene transfer, dispersing ARGs to native microbes. ARGs remain in the soil resistome longer with manure use. Moreover, these genes persist chronically in the environment through co-resistance to metals, where these long-lasting metals continue to act as a selective pressure to maintain resistance. Even without antibiotic contamination, fecal matter alters soil composition, fueling the growth of pre-existing resistant bacteria.

== Human feces ==
Depending on the individual and the circumstances, human beings may defecate several times a day, every day, or once every two or three days. Extensive hardening of the feces that interrupts this routine for several days or more is called constipation.

The appearance of human fecal matter varies according to diet and health. Normally it is semisolid, with a mucus coating. A combination of bile and bilirubin, which comes from dead red blood cells, gives feces the typical brown color.

After the meconium, the first stool expelled, a newborn's feces contains only bile, which gives it a dark yellow-green color. Breast feeding babies expel soft, pale yellowish, and not quite malodorous matter; but once the baby begins to eat, and the body starts expelling bilirubin from dead red blood cells, its matter acquires the familiar brown color.

At different times in their life, human beings will expel feces of different colors and textures. A stool that passes rapidly through the intestines will look greenish; lack of bilirubin will make the stool look like clay.

== Fecal microbiome and disease ==
Feces plays a key role in representing the microbiome within the gut. The gut microbiome is a very important indicator and mediator of the health of the organism in which it resides. The microbiome has function in the homeostasis, breakdown of foods otherwise not able to be digested. Within this gut microbiome the bacteria play an important role in the breakdown of foods, this often comes in the form of cell walls that are not broken down by standard processes of the organism but rather by the microbes that reside within the gut. These microbes also show presence in the feces of the animal that processed this food. The microbiome also contributes to immune responses in many ways such as competition with invasive bacteria, as well as improvement of the immune system.

The way that these bacteria are identified from the fecal samples is through 16s Ribosomal RNA sequencing or shotgun sequencing (genome of all microorganisms), which identifies the sequences of the microbiome and can be references to libraries for identification. Shotgun sequencing taxes the advantage when looking at the microbiome as a whole and trying to find changes within the taxa that are not as abundant, while 16s is beneficial to hone in and detect a specific part of the microbiome thus needing less material.

Feces is also a very strong indicator to disease, whether looking at just the physical properties or looking at the microbial composition of the fecal samples. Fecal biomarkers are something that is in the feces which can indicate the presence of certain diseases such as Inflammatory Bowel Disease. There can also be disease indication from looking at the physical properties of the feces, such as if the feces is more loose in the form of diarrhea.

== Uses of animal feces ==
=== Fertilizer ===
The feces of animals, e.g. guano and manure, often are used as fertilizer.

=== Energy ===
Dry animal dung, such as that of camel, bison and cattle, is burned as fuel in many countries.

Animals such as the giant panda and zebra possess gut bacteria capable of producing biofuel. The bacterium in question, Brocadia anammoxidans, can be used to synthesize the rocket fuel hydrazine.

=== Coprolites and paleofeces ===
A coprolite is fossilized feces and is classified as a trace fossil. In paleontology they give evidence about the diet of an animal. They were first described by William Buckland in 1829. Prior to this, they were known as "fossil fir cones" and "bezoar stones". They serve a valuable purpose in paleontology because they provide direct evidence of the predation and diet of extinct organisms. Coprolites may range in size from a few millimetres to more than 60 centimetres.

Palaeofeces are ancient feces, often found as part of archaeological excavations or surveys. Intact paleofeces of ancient people may be found in caves in arid climates and in other locations with suitable preservation conditions. These are studied to determine the diet and health of the people who produced them through the analysis of seeds, small bones, and parasite eggs found inside. Feces may contain information about the person excreting the material as well as information about the material. They also may be analyzed chemically for more in-depth information on the individual who excreted them, using lipid analysis and ancient DNA analysis. The success rate of usable DNA extraction is relatively high in paleofeces, making it more reliable than skeletal DNA retrieval.

The reason this analysis is possible at all is due to the digestive system not being entirely efficient, in the sense that not everything that passes through the digestive system is destroyed. Not all of the surviving material is recognizable, but some of it is. Generally, this material is the best indicator archaeologists can use to determine ancient diets, as no other part of the archaeological record is so direct an indicator.

A process that preserves feces in a way that they may be analyzed later is the Maillard reaction. This reaction creates a casing of sugar that preserves the feces from the elements. To extract and analyze the information contained within, researchers generally have to freeze the feces and grind it up into powder for analysis.

=== Other uses ===
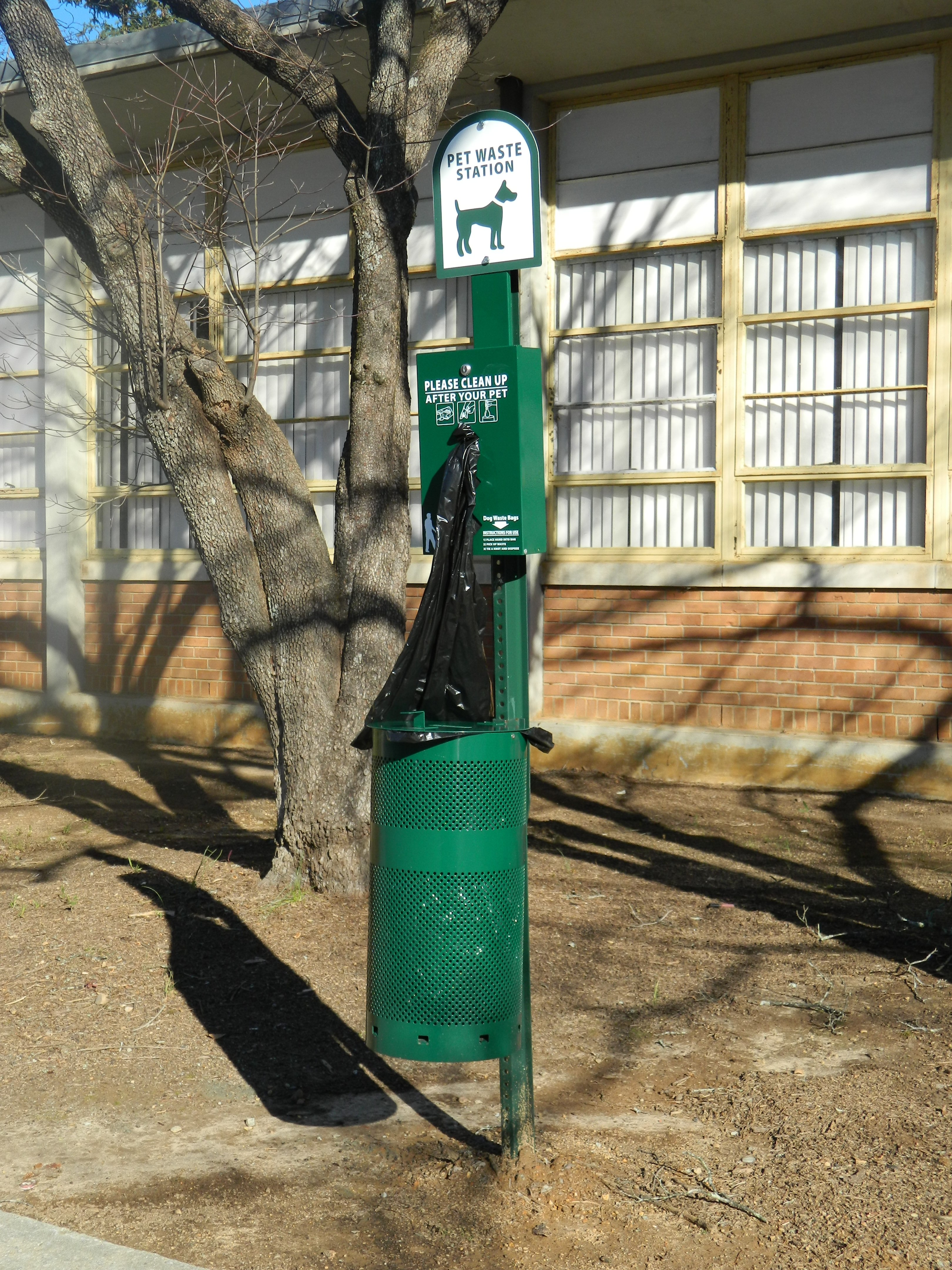
A pet waste station in Tucker, Georgia, US

Animal dung occasionally is used as a cement to make adobe (mudbrick) huts, or even in throwing sports, especially with cow and camel dung.

Kopi luwak, or civet coffee, is coffee made from coffee beans that have been eaten and excreted by Asian palm civets (Paradoxurus hermaphroditus).

Giant pandas provide fertilizer for the world's most expensive green tea. In Malaysia, tea is made from the droppings of stick insects fed on guava leaves.

In northern Thailand, elephants are used to digest coffee beans in order to make Black Ivory coffee, which is among the world's most expensive coffees. Paper is also made from elephant dung in Thailand. Haathi Chaap is a brand of paper made from elephant dung.

Dog feces was used in the tanning process of leather during the Victorian era. Collected dog feces, known as "pure", "puer", or "pewer", were mixed with water to form a substance known as "bate", because proteolytic enzymes in the dog feces helped to relax the fibrous structure of the hide before the final stages of tanning. Dog feces collectors were known as pure finders.

Elephants, hippos, koalas and pandas are born with sterile intestines, and require bacteria obtained from eating the feces of their mothers to digest vegetation.

In India, cow dung and cow urine are major ingredients of the traditional Hindu drink Panchagavya. Politician Shankarbhai Vegad stated that they can cure cancer.

== Terminology ==
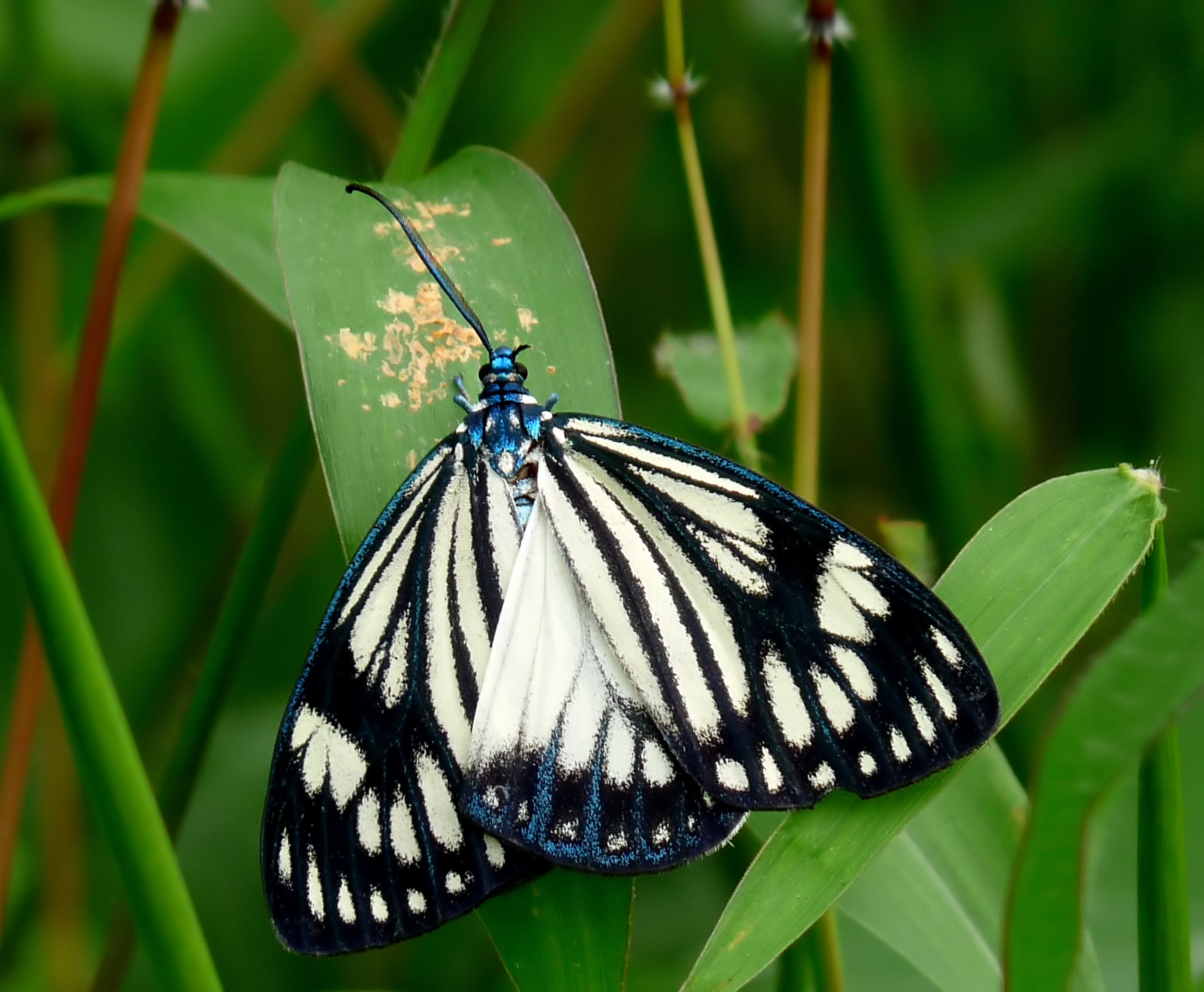
Cyclosia papilionaris consuming bird droppings

Feces is the scientific terminology, while the term stool is also commonly used in medical contexts. Outside of scientific contexts, these terms are less common, with the most common layman's term being poo or poop. The terms shit and crap are also in common use, although these are widely considered vulgar or offensive. There are many other terms, see below.

=== Etymology ===
The word faeces is the plural of the Latin word faex meaning "dregs". In most English-language usage, there is no singular form, making the word a plurale tantum; out of various major dictionaries, only one enters variation from plural agreement.

=== Synonyms ===
"Feces" is used more in biology and medicine than in other fields (reflecting science's tradition of classical Latin and Neo-Latin)

- In hunting and tracking, terms such as dung, scat, spoor, and droppings normally are used to refer to non-human animal feces
- In husbandry and farming, manure is common.
- Stool is a common term in reference to human feces. For example, in medicine, to diagnose the presence or absence of a medical condition, a stool sample sometimes is requested for testing purposes.
- The term bowel movement(s) (with each movement a defecation event) is also common in health care.

There are many synonyms in informal registers for feces, just like there are for urine. Many are euphemistic, colloquial, or both; some are profane (such as shit), whereas most belong chiefly to child-directed speech) or to crude humor (such as crap, dump, load and turd).

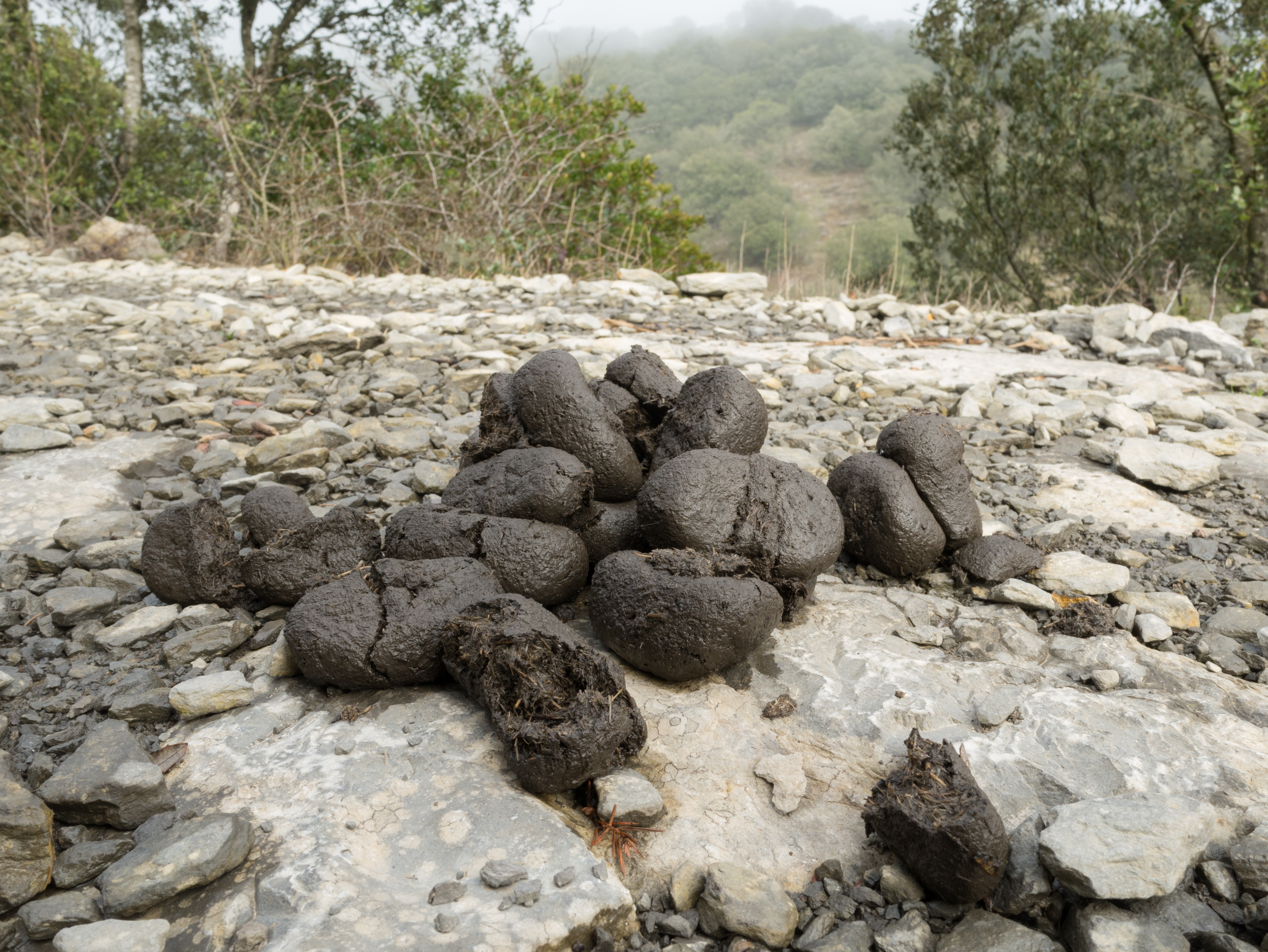
Horse dung

=== Feces of animals ===
The feces of animals often have special names (some of them are slang), for example:

- Non-human animals
  - As bulk material – dung
  - Individually – droppings
- Cattle
  - Bulk material – cow dung
  - Individual droppings – cow pats, meadow muffins, etc.
- Deer (and formerly other quarry animals) – fewmets
- Wild carnivores – scat
- Otter – spraint
- Birds (individual) – droppings (also include urine as white crystals of uric acid)
- Seabirds or bats (large accumulations) – guano
- Herbivorous insects, such as caterpillars and leaf beetles – frass
- Earthworms, lugworms etc. – worm castings (feces extruded at ground surface)
- Feces when used as fertilizer (usually mixed with animal bedding and urine) – manure
- Horses – horse manure, roadapple (before motor vehicles became common, horse droppings were a big part of the rubbish communities needed to clean off roads)

== Society and culture ==
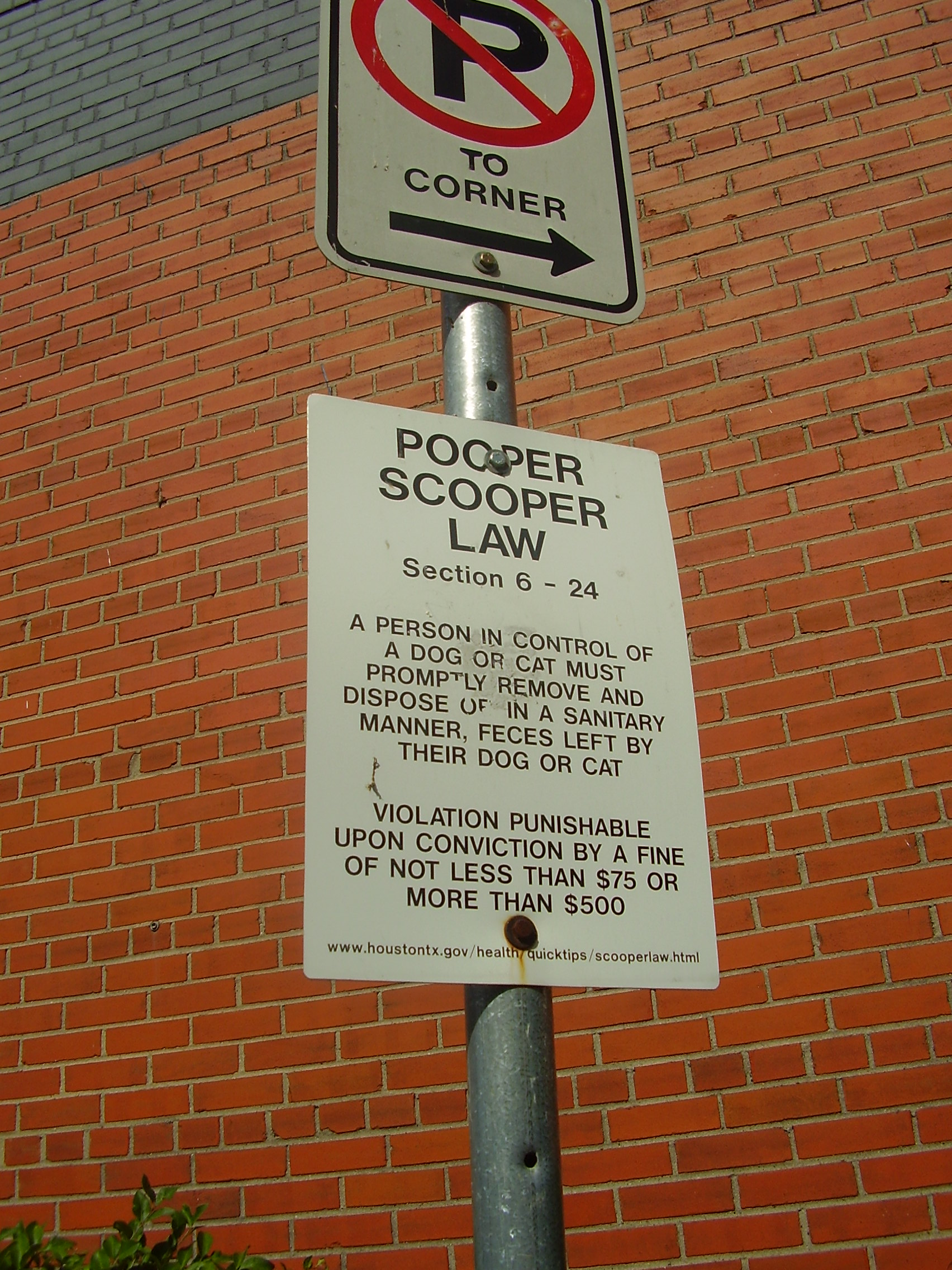
Sign ordering owners to clean up after pets, Houston, Texas, 2011

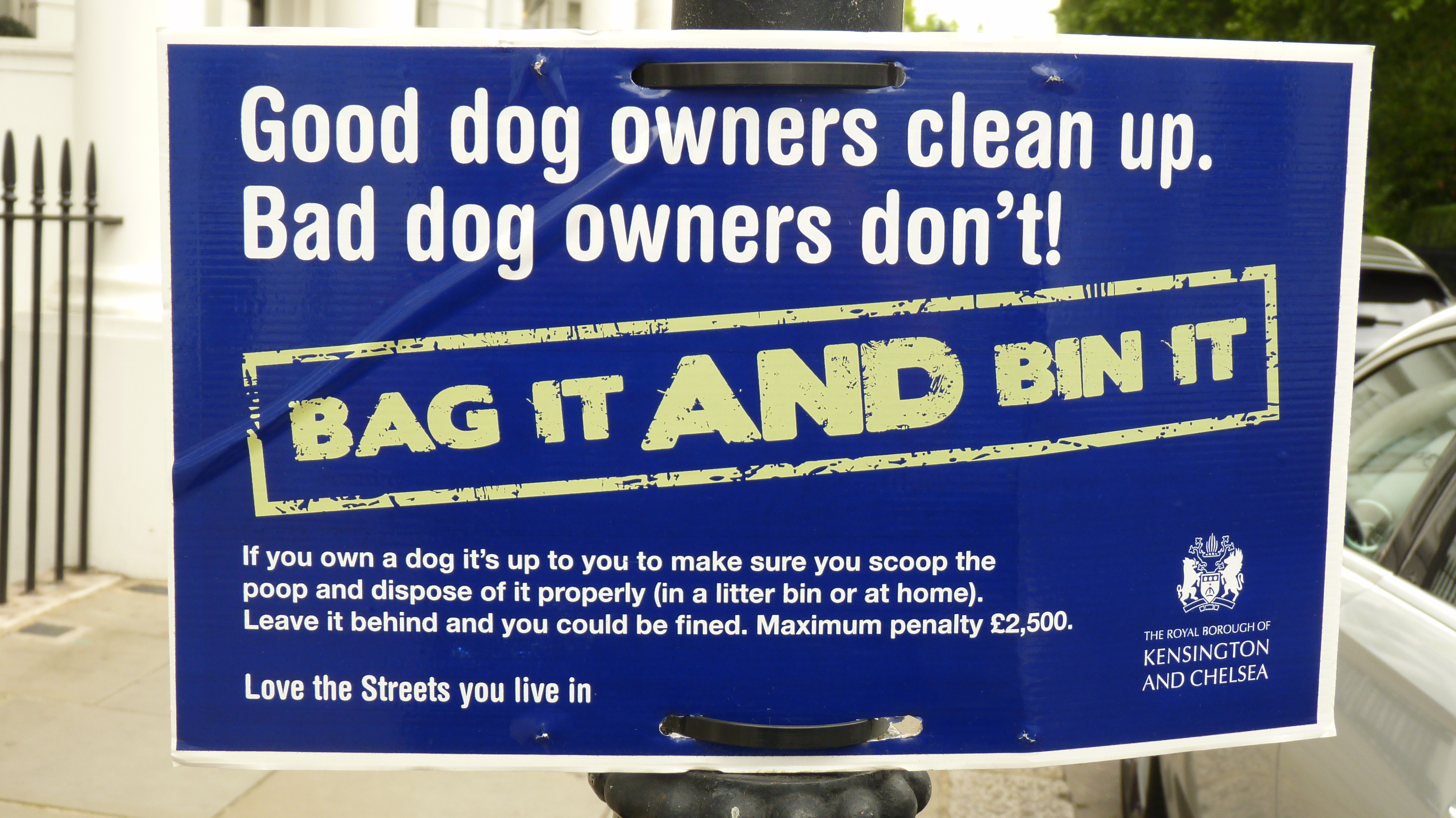
Sign in Kensington, 2024

=== Feelings of disgust ===
In all human cultures, feces elicit varying degrees of disgust in adults. Children under two years typically have no disgust response to it, suggesting it is culturally derived. Disgust toward feces appears to be strongest in cultures where flush toilets make olfactory contact with human feces minimal. Disgust is experienced primarily in relation to the sense of taste (either perceived or imagined) and, secondarily to anything that causes a similar feeling by sense of smell, touch, or vision.

=== Social media ===
There is a Pile of Poo emoji represented in Unicode as U+1F4A9 💩 PILE OF POO, called unchi or unchi-kun in Japan.

=== Jokes ===
Poop is the center of toilet humor, and is commonly an interest of young children and teenagers.

== See also ==
- Coprophagia
- Coprophilia
- Coprophilous fungi
- Cow dung
- Dung paper
- Excretory system
- Fecal microbiota
- Fecal plug
- Jenkem
- Manure
- Metabolic waste
- Night soil
- Sanitation
- Scatology
- Whale feces
- Zooplankton fecal pellets
