= Boar taint =

Offensive odor or taste of pork from non-castrated adult male pigs

Boar taint is the offensive odor or taste that can be evident during the cooking or eating of pork or pork products derived from non-castrated male pigs once they reach puberty. Boar taint is found in around 20% of entire male finishing pigs. Skatole may also be detected in young female swine, but this is linked with fecal contamination of the skin. Studies show that about 75% of consumers are sensitive to boar taint, leading pork producers to control this in order to maximize profits.

== Causes ==
Boar taint is caused by the accumulation of two compounds – androstenone and skatole – in the fat of male pigs. Androstenone (a male pheromone) is produced in the testes as male pigs reach puberty and gives the meat a urine or sweat flavour, while skatole (a byproduct of intestinal bacteria, or bacterial metabolite of the amino acid tryptophan) is produced in both male and female pigs and gives the meat a 'fecal' flavour. However, levels are much higher in intact boars, because testicular steroids inhibit its breakdown by the liver. As a result, skatole accumulates in the fat of male pigs as they mature.

== Controlling boar taint ==
For centuries, pigs have been castrated to prevent boar taint. Castration rates vary from country to country, and most still do not use anesthesia or analgesia when castrating pigs. Commercial farms that do castrate will do so in the pig's first week of life.

Another possible method to control boar taint is to use sex sorted semen for artificial insemination so as to produce mostly female offspring. This method has been successfully used in cattle breeding, but the technique is still under research and no economical or practical solution yet exists in pig production.

As castration has received criticism in recent years, for welfare reasons, some producers and producer associations are seeking alternative methods to control boar taint. Some producers are breeding out the taint and avoiding the few breeds of pigs that are high in taint. Yorkshire, Hampshire and other lighter-colored pigs are known to be particularly low in the androstenone-based taint while Duroc pigs are high in the taint.

=== Vaccination ===
Vaccination against boar taint with Improvac, which has been used in Australia and New Zealand since 1998, is a solution that uses the pig's immune system to control boar taint. The use of the vaccine is claimed to be as simple and reliable as physical castration in controlling boar taint. It can be administered by trained farm personnel and enables the production of pork meat that is claimed to be of high quality and to be safe for consumers to eat.

The vaccine works by stimulating the pig's immune system to produce specific antibodies against gonadotropin-releasing hormone (GnRH). This temporarily inhibits testes function and thus stops the production and accumulation of boar taint–causing compounds.

By stimulating production of antibodies specific to GnRH, the vaccine stops the chain of events that lead to the release of testosterone and other steroids from the testes, including androstenone, one of the two causes of boar taint. The other major taint-causing compound, skatole, is also eliminated, because the lower steroid levels allow the liver to more efficiently metabolise it.

Each pig must be immunised twice to successfully control boar taint. The timing of the first dose is relatively flexible, but there must be a minimum of four weeks between the two doses, with the second taking place four to six weeks before slaughter. After the second dose, the boar's testicles stop growing. The handler should be trained in the use of the vaccine and the vaccinator with enhanced safety features.

The vaccine is claimed to offer an animal-friendly and a more environmentally sustainable solution to boar taint, and to allow getting benefits of natural boar growth while preserving eating quality. However concerns about the effect of the drugs on animal and consumer health have been expressed.

The vaccine will work in multiple mammalian species and is commonly used for contraceptive purposes in zoo animals and oestrus suppression in horses. The vaccine would also work to temporarily prevent sexual function in humans, but no cases of this have ever been recorded.
