= Poland China =

American breed of pig

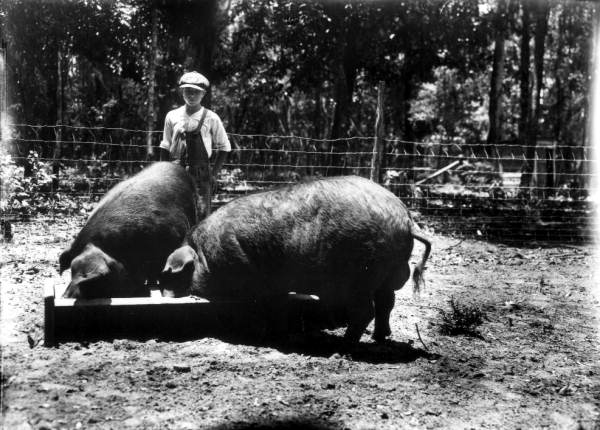
- Boars in Florida in about 1917
- Conservation status: FAO (2007): not at risk; DAD-IS (2026): not at risk
- Other names: Warren County Hog; Miami; Big China; Poland; Poland-China
- Country of origin: United States

Traits
- Weight: Male: 290 kg (640 lb); Female: 240 kg (530 lb)
- Skin color: black with six white points – nose, tail and feet

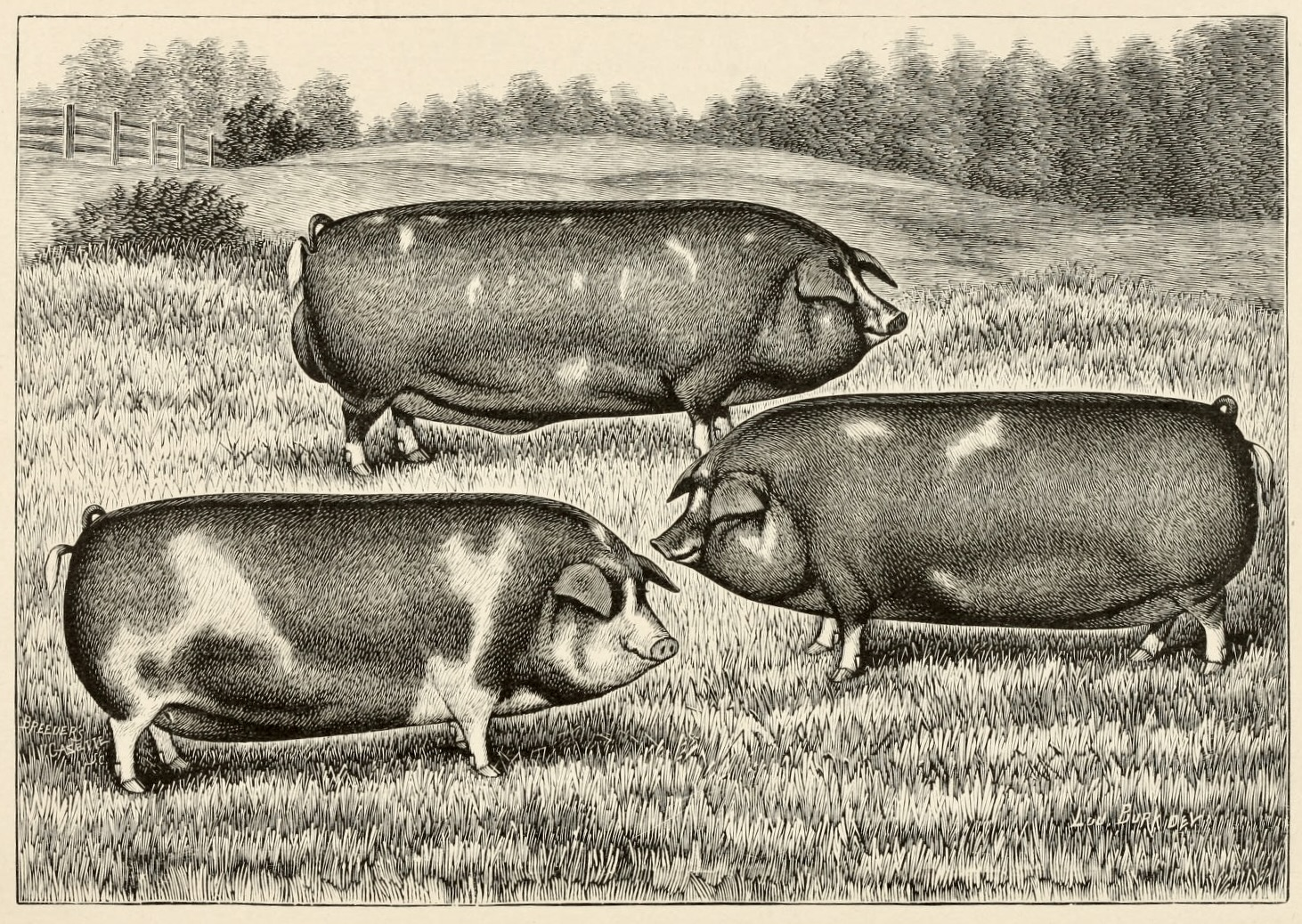
Six-month-old boar and sows showing white spotting, illustration from 1887

The Poland China is an American breed of domestic pig. It was first bred in Warren County in Ohio, in the American Midwest. Its origins lie in a small number of pigs of Chinese type bought in 1816, which were cross-bred with a variety of breeds of European origin including the Berkshire. It was bred as a lard pig, and is among the largest of all pig breeds.

== History ==
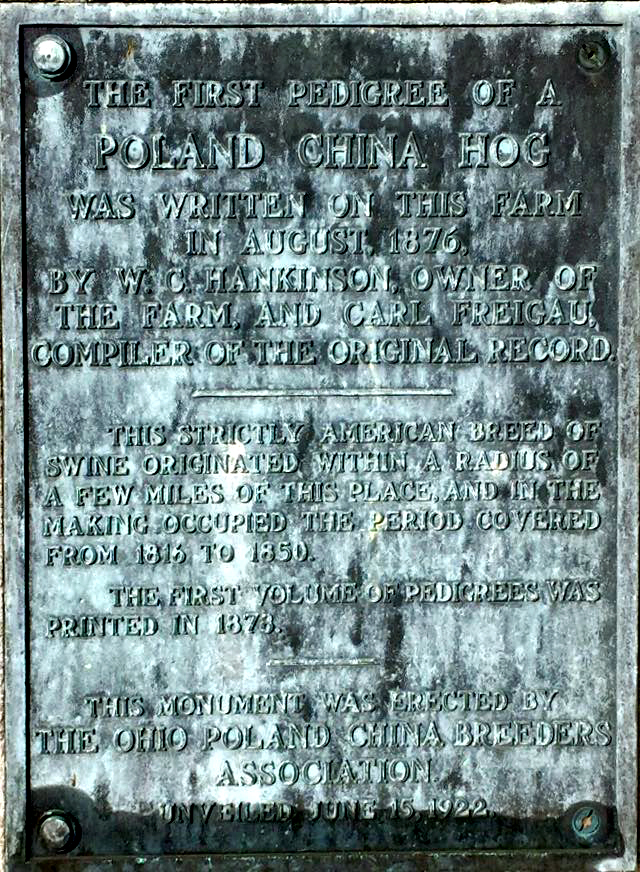
Bronze plaque in Blue Ball, Ohio, commemorating the first Poland China pedigree, written on the Hankinson farm in 1876

The origins of the Poland China lie in the purchase in Philadelphia in 1816 by John Wallace, a trustee of the Shaker Society of Union Village in Warren County, Ohio, of four pigs of the breed or type known as Big China; it is possible that they were in fact of the now-extinct Bedford breed. Three sows and a boar were brought to the village of Union, where Shaker farmers cross-bred them with local pigs of the types known as Russia or Byfield, both large pale-skinned pigs. Further crossing with other breeds of European origin including the British Berkshire and the Irish Grazier – a slow-growing pig with good ability to forage for itself – led to the consolidation of a type which by about 1846 was usually known as the Warren County Pig, but also as the Poland or Big China.

The name Poland China was agreed on at a meeting of the National Swine Breeders Convention in Indianapolis in 1872; at the same meeting the convention rejected the claim of David M. Magie, a successful Poland China breeder of the Austin-Magie Farm near Oxford, Ohio, to be the creator of the breed. The first pedigree was drawn up in Blue Ball, Ohio, by W.C. Hankinson and Carl Freigau in 1876, and a herd-book was started in 1878.

The breed became widespread in the United States, and by the end of the nineteenth century was among the most numerous pig breeds in the country. Numbers fell in the twentieth century as demand for lard decreased. In 1990 the registered population was about 18000 head. (Note: For comparison, the corresponding figure for each of the three dominant breeds – the American Yorkshire, the Duroc and the Hampshire – was more than ten times greater.) In 2018 a total population of 12300 was reported.

The Poland China has been exported to a number of countries in Central and South America, in Asia and in Oceania. In 2026 it was reported to DAD-IS by thirteen countries, of which two – Argentina and the United States – also reported population numbers; approximately seven-eighths of the total estimated number of the pigs world-wide, 62795, were in Argentina. The Poland China was formerly reared in very large numbers there, principally for export. In 1944 about 1.3 million head were slaughtered, approximately a third of total production in the country.

In the 1920s and 1930s, agricultural reformers introduced the Poland China pig into China, with mixed success. The pigs were not adapted to the climate, and Chinese farmers were more interested in a pig's ability to produce fertilizer than its meat capacity.

== Characteristics ==
The Poland China usually displays the coloration of the Berkshire: solid black, with white points on the nose, tail and feet. It is a large pig, heavy-jowled, lop-eared and short-legged. It is among the heaviest of pig breeds: sows average some 240 kg, boars about 50 kg more. The heaviest pig on record is a Poland China named Big Bill, who in Tennessee in 1933 was found to weigh 1158 kg (2552 lb), with a length of about 2.75 m (9 ft).
