= Dung paper =

Type of paper using natural fibers from cellulose-rich herbivorous feces

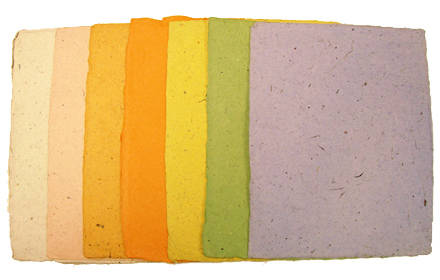
- Elephant dung paper
- Type: Paper; recycled paper
- Material: Herbivore feces
- Introduced: 1997, Kenya

Dung paper is a type of paper using natural fibers from cellulose-rich herbivorous feces. Many dung paper producers mix waste paper to make the paper more appealing while remaining eco-friendly.

== History ==
=== Elephant dung paper ===
Dung paper was invented by Kenyan conservationist Mike Bugara by late 1996, using African elephant dung. He found success with the Kenya Wildlife Service, which in 1997 commissioned his paper for special events. In the early 2000s, the KWS began to encourage other Kenyan farmers to collect elephant dung and produce elephant dung paper. As of 2025, 17 elephant dung paper companies operate in Kenya, with more in neighboring countries.

Elephant dung paper quickly spread outside of East Africa to Asia. In 1997, shortly after the introduction of African elephant dung paper, Thusitha Ranasinghe of Sri Lanka founded Eco Maximus to produce Indian elephant dung paper. Ranasinghe was inspired by reading about the Kenyan elephant dung paper in the news. Following two years of experimentation, in 2001 former paralegal Wanchai Asawawibulkij started a Thai elephant dung paper mill at the Thai Elephant Conservation Center in Lampang. In 2004 in Jaipur, India, papermakers Mahima Mehra & Vijendra Shekhawat founded Haathi Chaap to produce elephant dung paper from Indian elephants. The company initially had difficulty overcoming local workers' taboo against feces, but found success contextualizing the work as indirect worship of Ganesha.

=== Novel dung papers ===
Bugara's concept inspired other novel dung papers using other types of dung.

Elk (Moose)
Sweden, 2000, Ann-Mari Remahn & Sune Häggmark, Moose Garden)
Bison
Idaho, US, invented c. 2002, available 2005, Victor Bruha & Daniel Hidalgo, Dung and Dunger; inspired by Thai elephant dung paper.
Kangaroo and wallaby
Tasmania, Australia, 2005, Creative Paper Tasmania; inspired by African elephant dung paper and Scandinavian elk dung paper.
Domestic sheep
Wales, 2008, Lez Paylor & Lawrence Toms, Creative Paper Wales; inspired by kangaroo & wallaby dung paper.
Rhinoceros
Assam, India, 2013, Mahesh Bora, ElRhino; inspired by Rajasthan elephant dung paper.
Cattle
Rajasthan, India, 2018, Kumarappa National Handmade Paper Institute, Khadi and Village Industries Commission

== Production and use ==
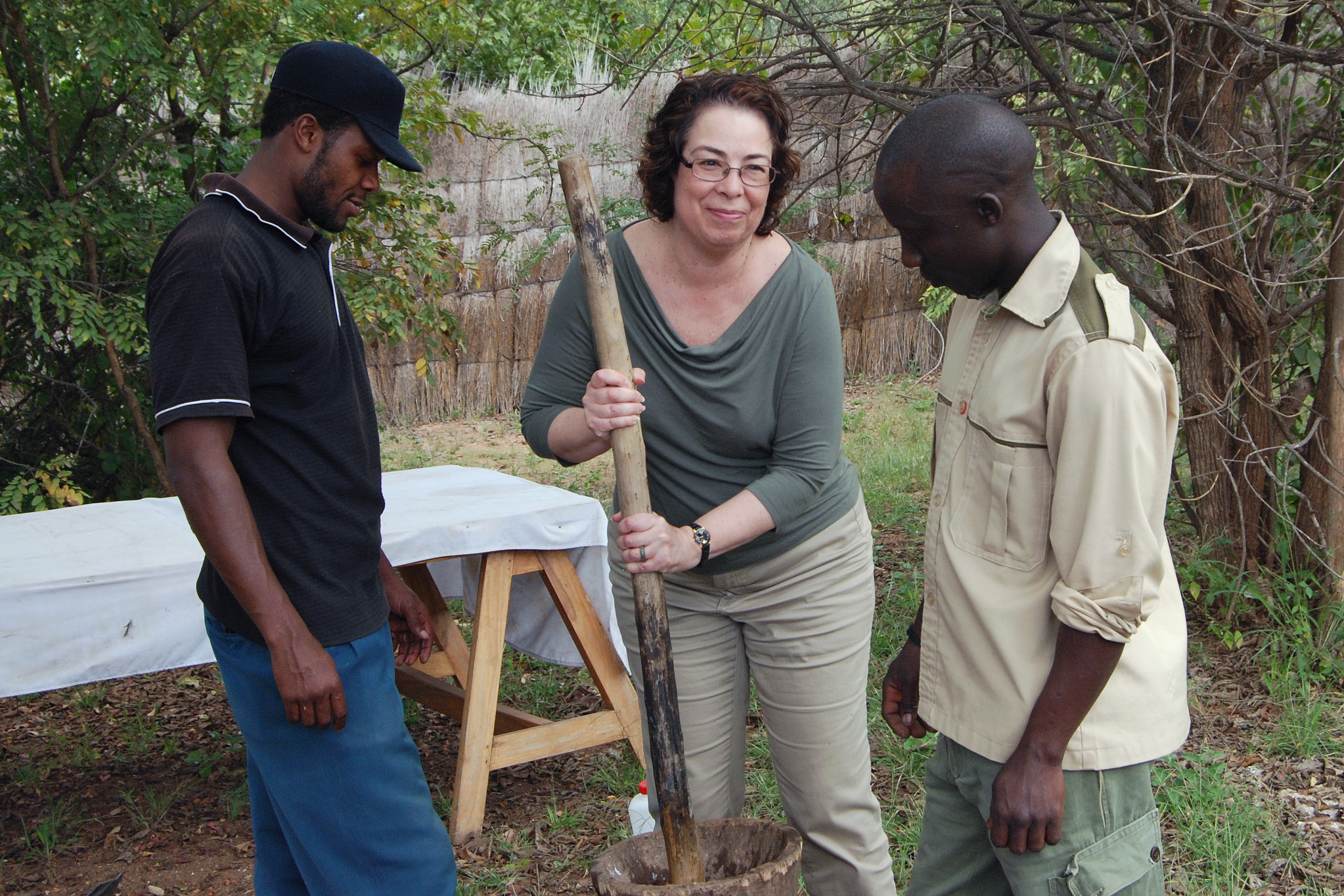
Tourist on safari pounding elephant dung

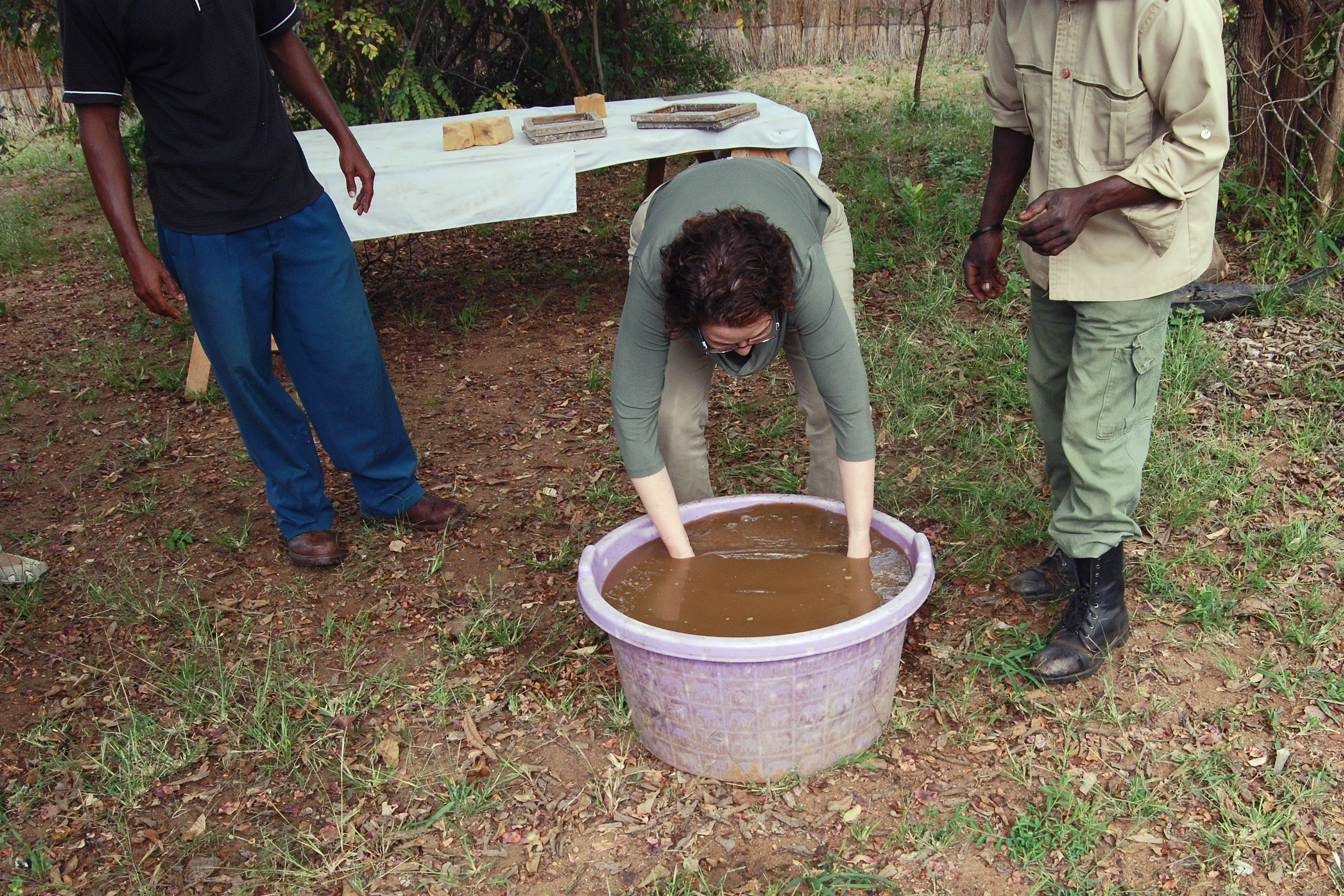
Washing pounded elephant dung

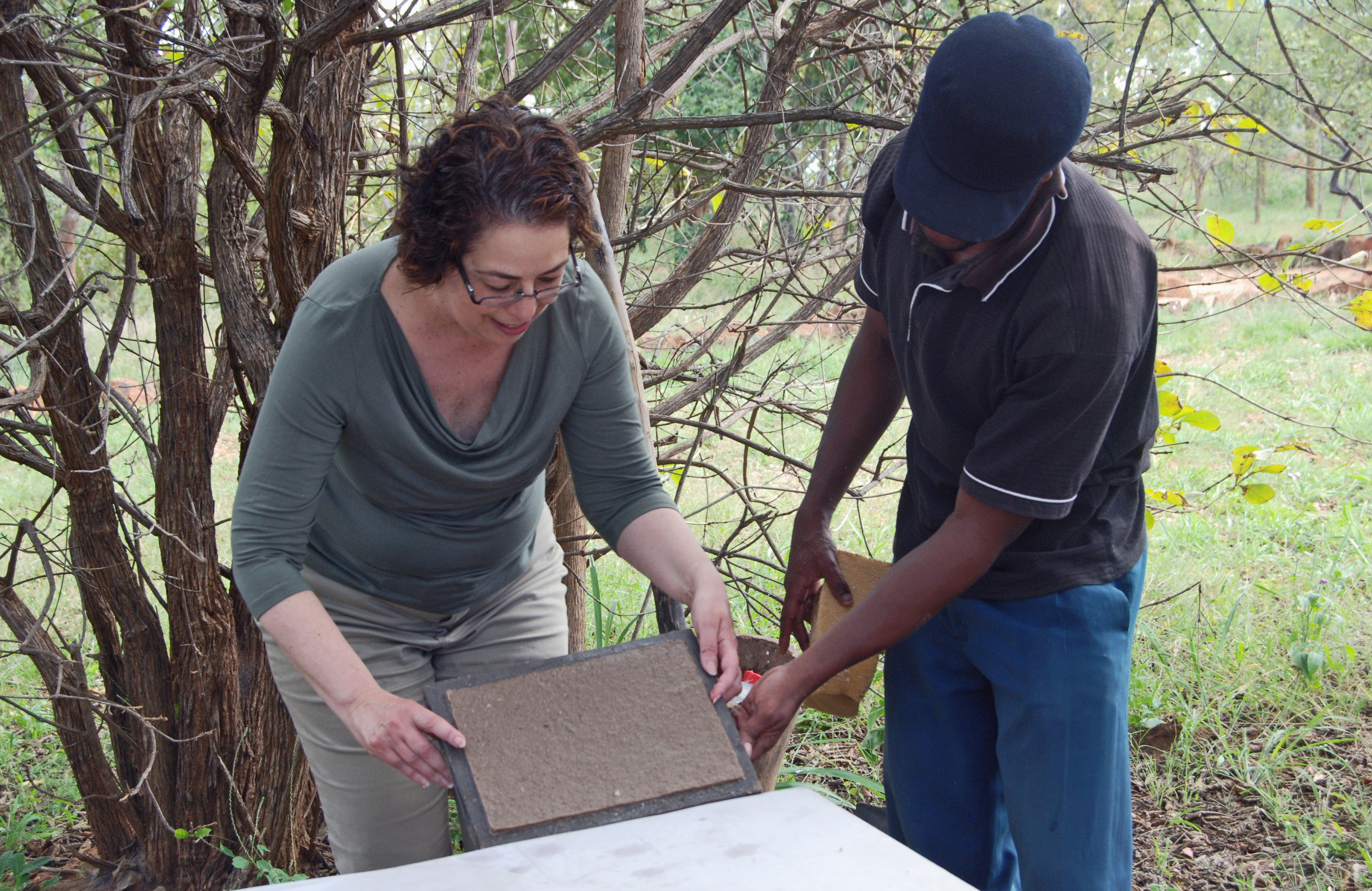
Formation of dung paper sheet using a deckle

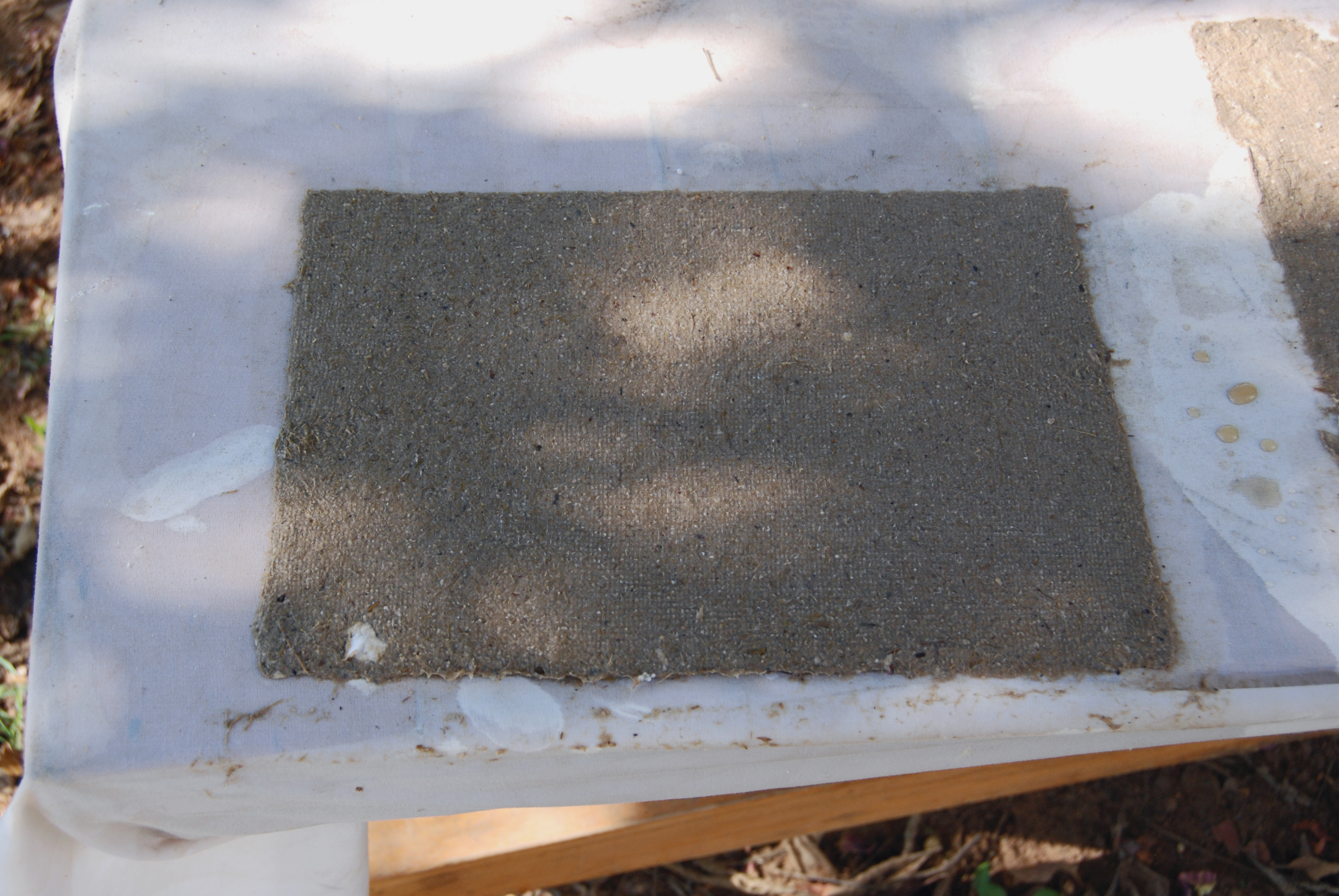
Dung paper sheet left to dry

All dung paper production follows the same general steps:

1. The collected dung is ground as needed into a paste;
2. The paste is washed as needed to separate the cellulose fibers from other fecal matter;
3. Additional fiber and liquids are added as desired, to adjust final paper properties;
4. The resulting slurry is screened into a sheet;
5. After final adjustments, the wet sheet is dried.

Dung paper is marketed in various ways across many companies, including as a novelty item, an eco-friendly good, a souvenir, and as folk art.

== See also ==
- Crop residue
- Upcycling
- Paper recycling
