= Blue Ball, Ohio =

Community in Ohio, United States

Coordinates: 39°29′36″N 84°20′11″W

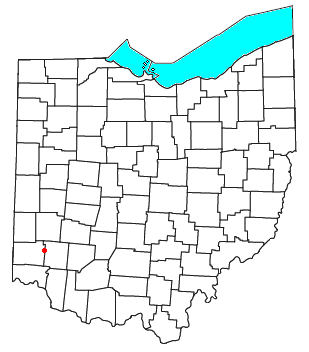
Location of Blue Ball, Ohio

Blue Ball is a community in Butler and Warren counties, in the U.S. state of Ohio. The community was established in 1820 at the intersection of the Dixie Highway (later U.S. Route 25). Blue Ball was annexed by nearby Middletown in 1994.

Blue Ball was so named because that image appeared on its tavern's signboard for the benefit of the illiterate.
