= American Berkshire =

American breed of pig

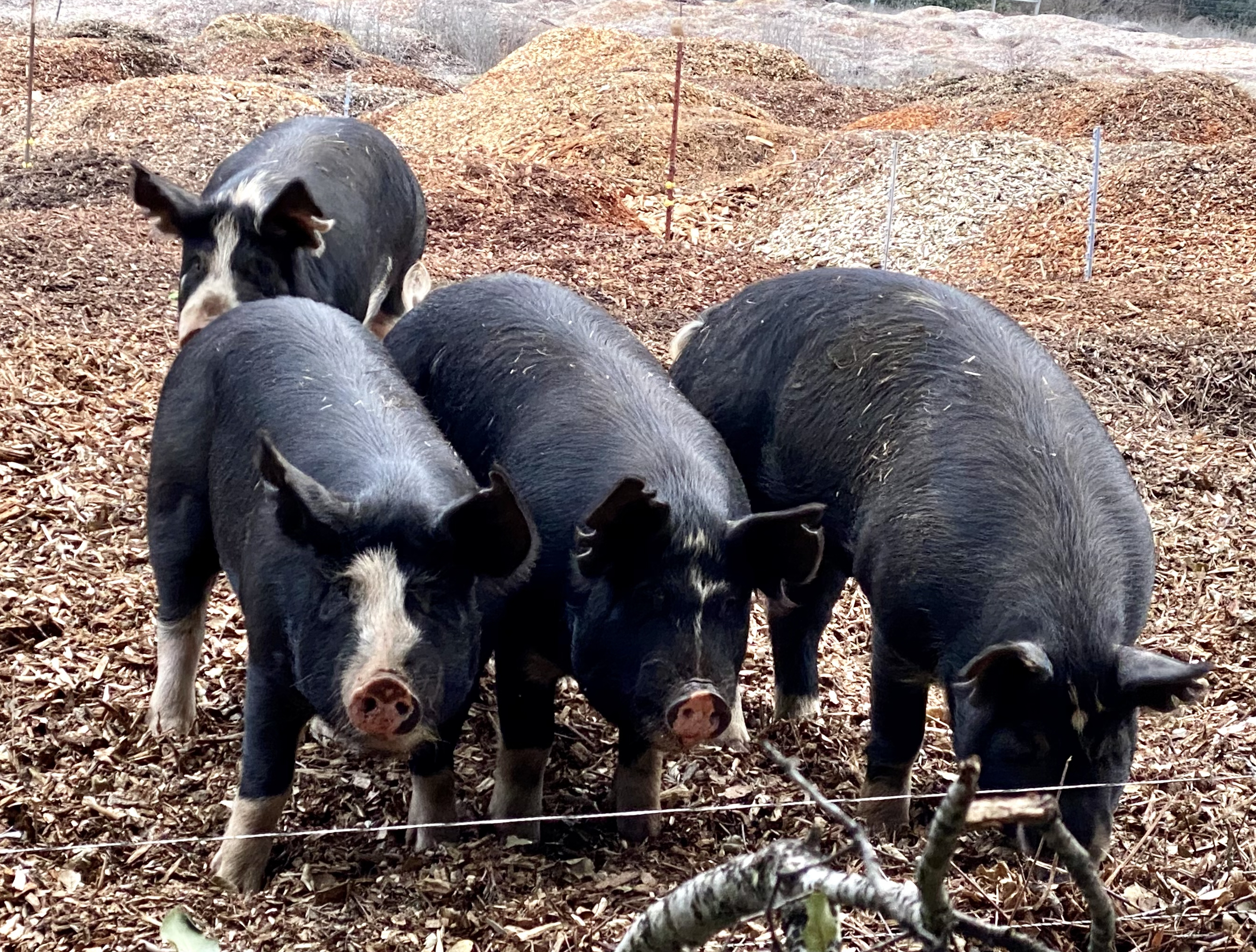
- Conservation status: FAO (2007): not at risk; DAD-IS (2026): not at risk
- Country of origin: United States
- Use: meat

Traits
- Weight: Male: 280 kg; Female: 220 kg
- Skin colour: black
- Hair: black

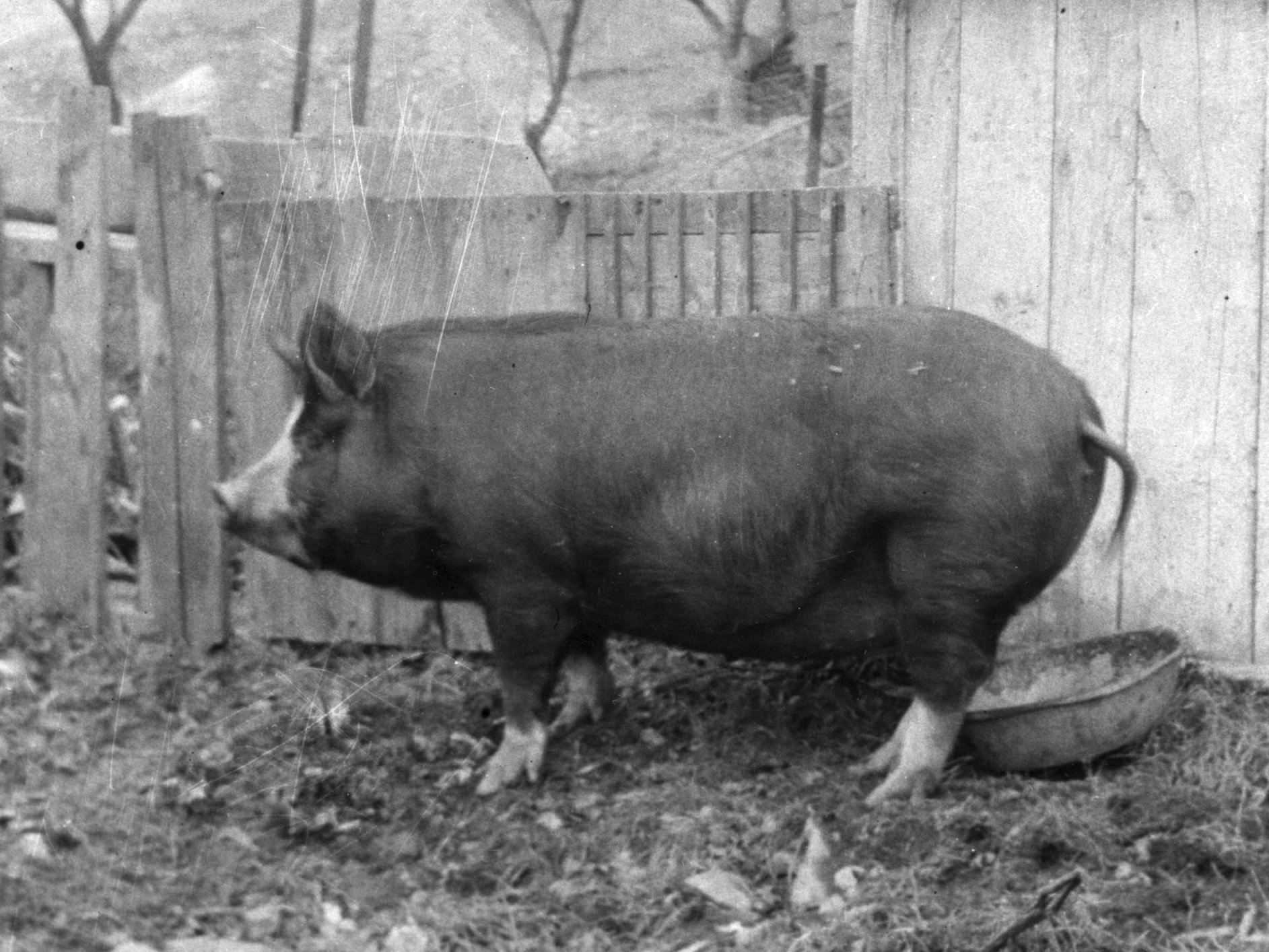
A sow in about 1910

The American Berkshire is an American breed of domestic pig. It derives from the Berkshire of the United Kingdom – which originated in the English county of the same name – but has evolved differently. It is normally black, with some white markings on the snout, on the lower legs, and on the tip of the tail.

The original Berkshire of the United Kingdom is a rare breed; the American breed is not endangered, and is not included in the Conservation Priority List of the Livestock Conservancy.

== History ==
The Berkshire is a traditional breed of the English county of the same name. Until the eighteenth century it was a large tawny-coloured pig with lop ears, often with darker patches. In the late eighteenth and early nineteenth centuries it was substantially modified by cross-breeding with small black pigs imported from Asia.

Exports to the United States began in about 1823. A breed society, the American Berkshire Association, was established in 1875 and is believed to have been the first such society for a pig breed. The first pig to be registered was a boar named Ace of Spades, who had been bred on an estate belonging to Queen Victoria.

For much of the nineteenth century and most of the first half of the twentieth, the Berkshire was one of the three breeds principally used in cross-breeding for stock improvement; the others were the Big Poland and the Irish Grazier. After the Second World War pig-farming was gradually industrialized and focused only on cross-breeding of three breeds, the Duroc, the Hampshire and the American Yorkshire; the importance of the other principal commercial breeds – including the Berkshire – decreased, and so did breed numbers. In the twenty-first century the Berkshire is not an endangered breed: it was listed as 'not at risk' by the Food and Agriculture Organization of the United Nations in 2007 and again in DAD-IS in 2026; in that year it was not included in the Conservation Priority List of the Livestock Conservancy.

== Characteristics ==
The American Berkshire is black with white markings in six points: four white socks, a white splash on the snout, and a white tip to the tail. It is prick-eared and has an up-turned snout.

== Use ==
The pigs are reared for pork. Although the meat has a relatively low pH, and high pH is normally correlated with consumer satisfaction, Berkshire pork was highly rated in taste tests in the United States.
