= Haathi Chaap =

Brand of paper manufactured in India

Logo of "Haathi Chaap"

Haathi Chaap is a brand of paper manufactured in Rajasthan, India, out of elephant dung. The name comes from 'Haathi', meaning 'Elephant' in Hindi and 'Chaap' which means 'press' or 'imprint'. Elephant dung paper was first made by Vijendra Singh Shekhawat. Other than in India, elephant dung paper is also being manufactured in Sri Lanka and South Africa.

Haathi Chaap was founded by entrepreneur Vijendra Singh Shekhawat in 2003. For the first four years, they exported their paper to Germany. In 2007, it was launched in India.

The cleaning of the dung is one of the most important processes. The dung is washed thoroughly with water in large water tanks. The water of the dung is used as fertilizers in the field, and the dung is dried up and used to manufacture paper.

== History ==
Few years ago Vijendra Shekhawat went to a shrine atop a hill in Jaipur. While he was walking at the foot of the hill, he realized that most of the pilgrims preferred to ride on an elephant's back. He observed a few elephants trampling dry elephant dung underfoot. It occurred to him that this smashed dung looks like raw fibre from which paper might be made.

Later on many experiments were done on elephant dung until paper was successfully produced. Later, it was named Haathi Chaap.

== Manufacturing Process ==
- First, elephant dung is dried, washed and disinfected, so that only clean fibre remains.
- This fibre is sorted to remove all non-dung fibres (which might have stuck to the dung that is often collected from roadsides or reserved forests).
- The sorted fibre is boiled for at least four hours in a vat to ensure the fibres are clean and soft.
- The manufacturing process thereafter is similar to that of handmade paper. The boiled pulp is then put through pulp beaters. Colours or dyes are added when the pulp is beaten in the beater. Then the pulp is mixed with water, and lifted up on flat sieves, to dry into reams of paper. Once the paper has dried, it is either smoothened by stones or by passing it through a calendering machine to make it smooth and usable.

== Products ==
Various products were made using elephant dung:

- Bags
- Frames
- Photo Albums
- Stationery
- Cards
