= 2-Methylindole =

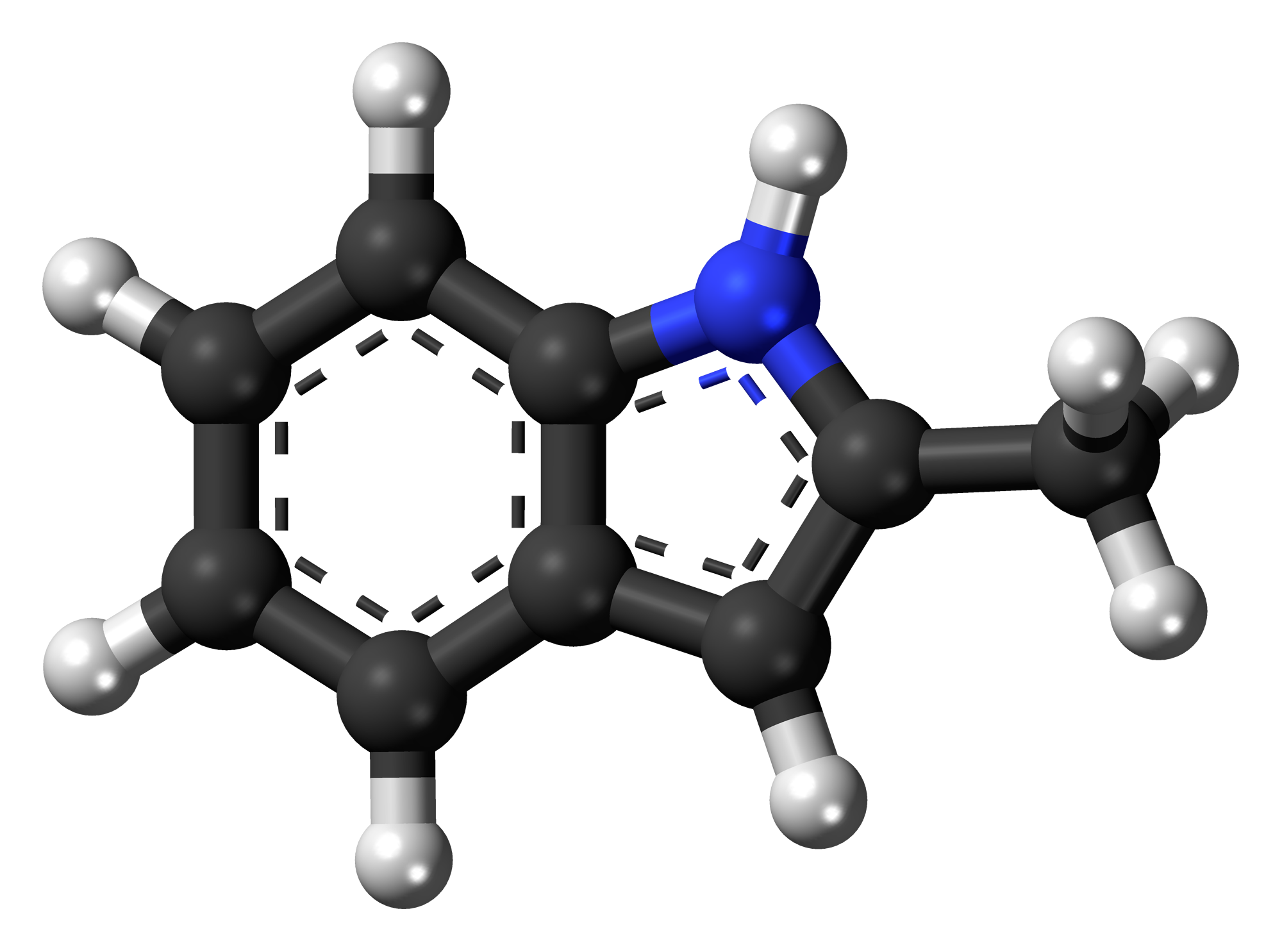

Names
- Preferred IUPAC name 2-Methyl-1H-indole

Identifiers
CAS Number	95-20-5
3D model (JSmol)	Interactive image
ChEMBL	ChEMBL259419
ChemSpider	6954
ECHA InfoCard	100.002.181
PubChem CID	7224
UNII	I7CN58827I
CompTox Dashboard (EPA)	DTXSID5059117
- InChI: InChI=1S/C9H9N/c1-7-6-8-4-2-3-5-9(8)10-7/h2-6,10H,1H3 Key: BHNHHSOHWZKFOX-UHFFFAOYSA-N
- SMILES: Cc2cc1ccccc1[nH]2

Properties
Chemical formula	C_{9}H_{9}N
Molar mass	131.178 g·mol^{−1}
Appearance	Light brown crystalline solid
- Except where otherwise noted, data are given for materials in their standard state (at 25 °C [77 °F], 100 kPa). verify (what is ?) Infobox references

Methylketol or 2-methylindole is a mildly toxic and slightly flammable organic compound which occurs as a white solid which turns brown over time. It has chemical formula C_{9}H_{9}N.

Methylketol is used as an intermediate for synthesizing dyes, pigments, optical brighteners, and pharmaceuticals.

== See also ==
- Indole
- Methyl
- 1-Methylindole
- 5-Methylindole
- 7-Methylindole
- Skatole (3-methylindole)
