= 5-Methylindole =

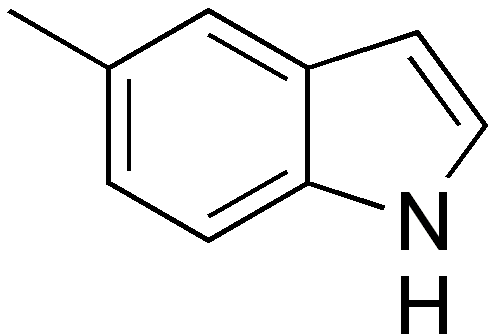

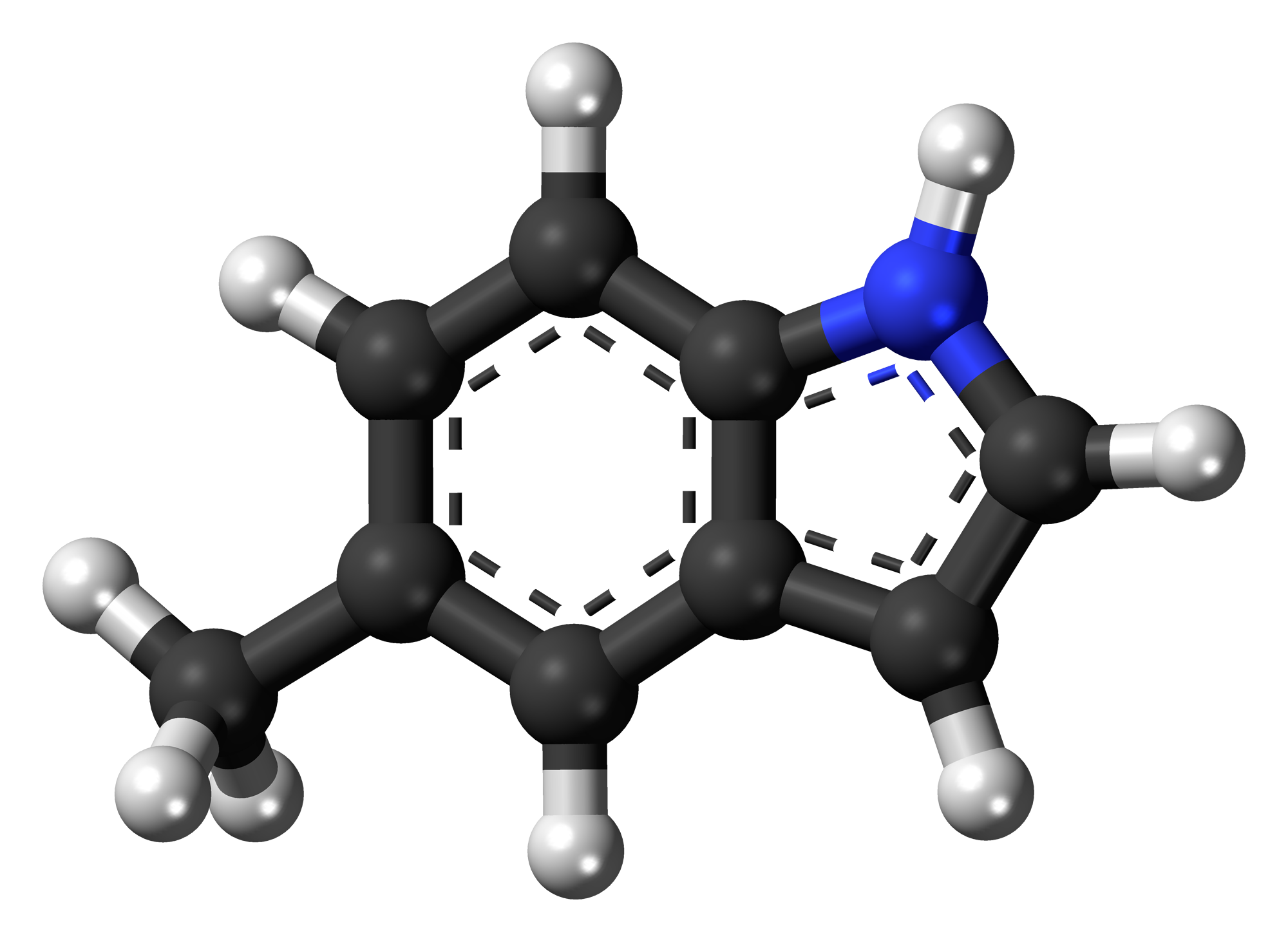

Names
- IUPAC name 5-Methyl-1H-indole

Identifiers
CAS Number	614-96-0
3D model (JSmol)	Interactive image; Interactive image
ChEMBL	ChEMBL112462
ChemSpider	11483
ECHA InfoCard	100.009.456
PubChem CID	11978
UNII	KT52363RI5
CompTox Dashboard (EPA)	DTXSID6060638
- InChI: InChI=1S/C9H9N/c1-7-2-3-9-8(6-7)4-5-10-9/h2-6,10H,1H3 Key: YPKBCLZFIYBSHK-UHFFFAOYSA-N; InChI=1/C9H9N/c1-7-2-3-9-8(6-7)4-5-10-9/h2-6,10H,1H3 Key: YPKBCLZFIYBSHK-UHFFFAOYAI
- SMILES: CC1=CC2=C(C=C1)NC=C2; Cc1ccc2c(c1)cc[nH]2

Properties
Chemical formula	C_{9}H_{9}N
Molar mass	131.178 g·mol^{−1}
Melting point	58 to 61 °C (136 to 142 °F; 331 to 334 K)

Related compounds
Related compounds	Indole; 1-Methylindole; 2-Methylindole (methylketol); Skatole (3-methylindole); 4-Methylindole; 6-Methylindole; 7-Methylindole
- Except where otherwise noted, data are given for materials in their standard state (at 25 °C [77 °F], 100 kPa). verify (what is ?) Infobox references

5-Methylindole is an irritating organic compound with chemical formula C_{9}H_{9}N. 5-Methylindole is used as an intermediate in the synthesis of compounds with a variety of pharmacological properties, such as staurosporine-like bisindole inhibitors of protein kinases.
