= Skatole =

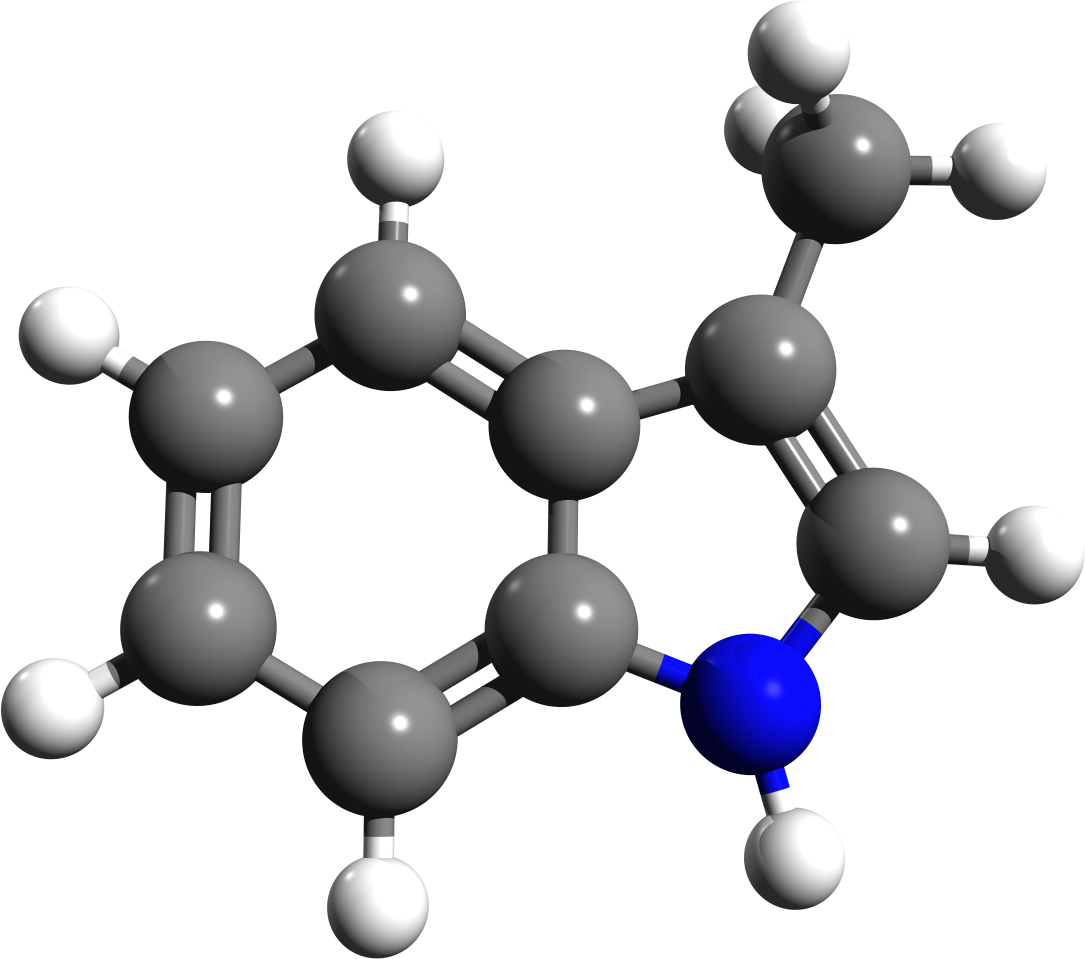

Names
- Preferred IUPAC name 3-Methyl-1H-indole
- Other names 3-Methylindole; 4-Methyl-2,3-benzopyrrole

Identifiers
CAS Number	83-34-1
3D model (JSmol)	Interactive image; Interactive image
ChEBI	CHEBI:9171
ChemSpider	6480
ECHA InfoCard	100.001.338
PubChem CID	6736
UNII	9W945B5H7R
CompTox Dashboard (EPA)	DTXSID8021775
- InChI: InChI=1S/C9H9N/c1-7-6-10-9-5-3-2-4-8(7)9/h2-6,10H,1H3 Key: ZFRKQXVRDFCRJG-UHFFFAOYSA-N; InChI=1/C9H9N/c1-7-6-10-9-5-3-2-4-8(7)9/h2-6,10H,1H3 Key: ZFRKQXVRDFCRJG-UHFFFAOYAZ
- SMILES: Cc1c[nH]c2ccccc12; c1cccc2c1c(c[nH]2)C

Properties
Chemical formula	C_{9}H_{9}N
Molar mass	131.178 g·mol^{−1}
Appearance	White crystalline solid
Odor	Fecal matter (pleasant flowery aroma in low concentrations)
Melting point	93 to 95 °C (199 to 203 °F; 366 to 368 K)
Boiling point	265 °C (509 °F; 538 K)
Solubility in water	Insoluble
- Except where otherwise noted, data are given for materials in their standard state (at 25 °C [77 °F], 100 kPa). verify (what is ?) Infobox references

Skatole (also spelled skatol) or 3-methylindole is an organic compound belonging to the indole family. It occurs naturally in the feces and farts of mammals and birds and is the primary contributor to fecal odor. At high to moderate concentrations, its aroma is described as "animal, fecal, naphthyl, civet". In low concentrations, it has a flowery smell and is found in several flowers and essential oils, including those of orange blossoms, jasmine, and Ziziphus mauritiana. It has also been identified in certain cannabis varieties.

Skatole is one of the volatile compounds in human breath associated with halitosis.

It is used as a fragrance and fixative in many perfumes and as an aroma compound. It is also used in low concentrations in some ice cream as a flavor enhancer. Its name derives from the Greek root skato-, meaning feces. Skatole was discovered in 1877 by the German physician Ludwig Brieger (1849–1919).

Ich habe mich zuerst mit der Untersuchung der flüchtigen Bestandtheile der Excremente aus sauerer Lösung beschäftigt. Es wurden dabei die flüchtigen Fettsäuren: Essigsäure, normale und Isobuttersäure, sowie die aromatischen Substanzen: Phenol, Indol und eine neue dem Indol verwandte Substanz, die ich Skatol nennen werde, erhalten.

[I was occupied initially with the investigation of the volatile components of excrement in acidic solution. One obtained thereby volatile fatty acids: acetic acid; normal and isobutyric acid; as well as the aromatic substances: phenol, indole and a new indole-derived substance which I will name "skatole".]

— Brieger, (1878), page 130

== Biosynthesis, chemical synthesis, and reactions ==
Skatole is derived from the amino acid tryptophan in the digestive tract of mammals. Tryptophan is converted to indoleacetic acid, which decarboxylates to give the methylindole. Once it is created in the digestive tract of mammals, it is metabolized by cytochrome P450 enzymes in the liver.

Skatole can be prepared in the laboratory via the Fischer indole synthesis, a method for the formation of indole derivatives from phenylhydrazines and carbonyl compounds. Phenylhydrazine and propanal can be used. A simplified reaction scheme is shown below.

It gives a violet color upon treatment with potassium ferrocyanide.

== Insect studies ==
Skatole is one of many compounds that are attractive to males of various species of orchid bees, which apparently gather the chemical to synthesize pheromones; it is commonly used as bait for these bees for study. It is also known for being an attractant for the Tasmanian grass grub beetle (Aphodius tasmaniae).

Skatole has been shown to be an attractant to gravid mosquitoes in both field and laboratory conditions. Because this compound is present in feces, it is found in combined sewage overflows (CSO), as streams and lakes containing CSO water have untreated human and industrial waste. CSO sites are thus of particular interest when studying mosquito-borne diseases such as West Nile virus.

The release of skatole by certain parasitic wasps in the family Bethylidae is used to determine which subfamily the species belongs to. Species of the Epyrinae subfamily release skatole, while those in the Bethylinae subfamily release a different chemical, spiroacetal.

== Animal studies ==
Skatole occurs naturally in the feces of all species of mammals and birds, and in the bovine rumen.

Skatole has been shown to cause pulmonary edema in goats, sheep, rats, and some strains of mice. It appears to selectively target club cells, which are the major site of cytochrome P450 enzymes in the lungs. These enzymes convert skatole to a reactive intermediate, 3-methyleneindolenine, which damages cells by forming protein adducts.

With the testicular steroid androstenone, skatole is regarded as a principal determinant of boar taint. High amounts of skatole stored in the fat tissue of pigs corresponds with boar taint. To address this, vaccinations with an immunogenic amount of Lawsonia intracellularis antigen are being studied. This antigen reduces the uptake of skatole into the fat of pigs, thus reducing the effect of boar taint. Another method used to address skatole concentration in fat tissue is supplementing the pig's diet with 3% chestnut wood extract. This method showed that intestinal skatole concentration decreased by more than 50%.

== Applications ==
Skatole is the starting material used in the synthesis of:

- Atiprosin
- Nerispirdine (besipirdine analog).
- 3-Methyl-3-piperidinooxindole [55490-24-9] (see page 751):
- Retrosynthetic analysis demonstrated that upon distillation with Zn dust, rauwolscine yields harman, skatole and isoquinoline.

== See also ==
- 1-Methylindole
- 2-Methylindole (methylketol)
- 5-Methylindole
- 7-Methylindole
- Cadaverine
