= 1-Methylindole =

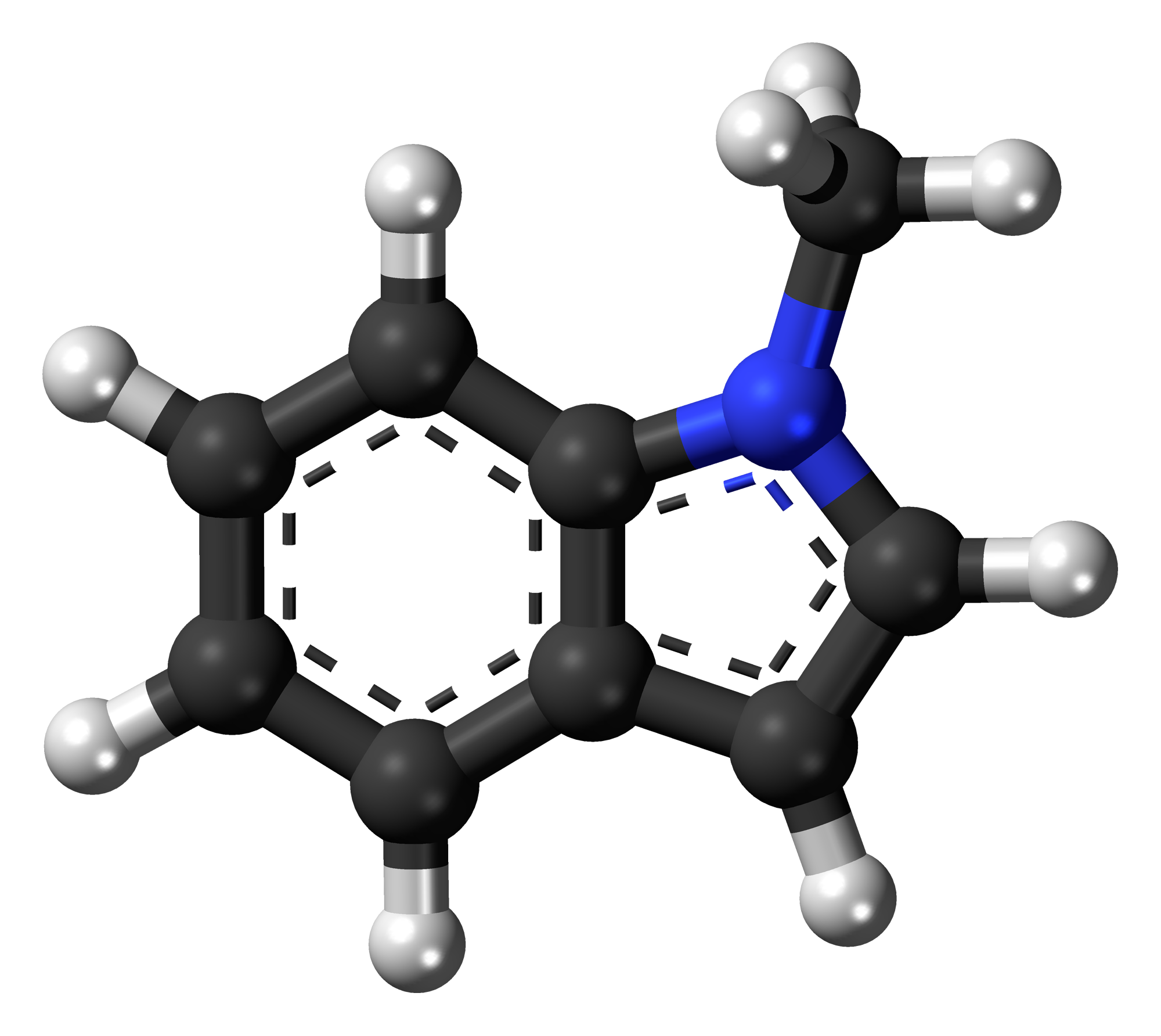

Names
- Preferred IUPAC name 1-Methyl-1H-indole

Identifiers
CAS Number	603-76-9
3D model (JSmol)	Interactive image; Interactive image
ChEMBL	ChEMBL19912
ChemSpider	11288
ECHA InfoCard	100.009.143
EC Number	210-057-5
PubChem CID	11781
UNII	8H698ROJ5F
CompTox Dashboard (EPA)	DTXSID3060534
- InChI: InChI=1S/C9H9N/c1-10-7-6-8-4-2-3-5-9(8)10/h2-7H,1H3 Key: BLRHMMGNCXNXJL-UHFFFAOYSA-N; InChI=1/C9H9N/c1-10-7-6-8-4-2-3-5-9(8)10/h2-7H,1H3 Key: BLRHMMGNCXNXJL-UHFFFAOYAN
- SMILES: c1cccc2c1ccn2C; Cn1ccc2c1cccc2

Properties
Chemical formula	C_{9}H_{9}N
Molar mass	131.177
Boiling point	236 to 239 °C (457 to 462 °F; 509 to 512 K)

Hazards
- GHS labelling
Pictograms	(GHS07: Exclamation mark)
Signal word	Warning
Hazard statements	H302, H312, H315, H319, H332, H335
Precautionary statements	P261, P264, P270, P271, P280, P301+P312, P302+P352, P304+P312, P304+P340, P305+P351+P338, P312, P321, P322, P330, P332+P313, P337+P313, P362, P363, P403+P233, P405, P501
Safety data sheet (SDS)	External MSDS from Oxford University
- Except where otherwise noted, data are given for materials in their standard state (at 25 °C [77 °F], 100 kPa). verify (what is ?) Infobox references

1-Methylindole is an irritating, potentially toxic organic compound which occurs as a deep yellow viscous liquid with a very strong unpleasant odor. It has the chemical formula C_{9}H_{9}N.

== See also ==
- Indole
- Methyl
- 2-Methylindole (methylketol)
- 5-Methylindole
- 7-Methylindole
- Skatole (3-methylindole)
