= 7-Methylindole =

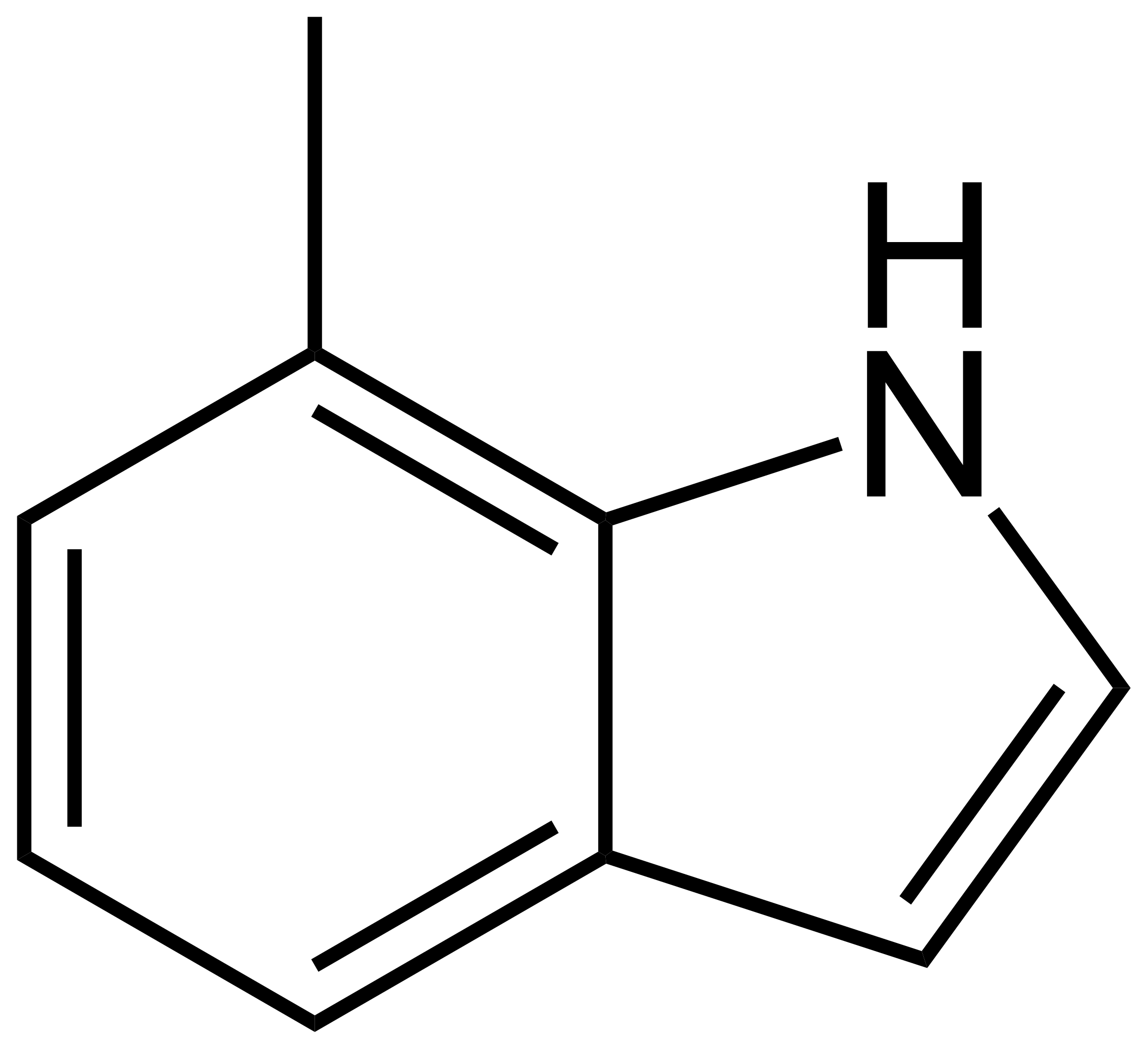

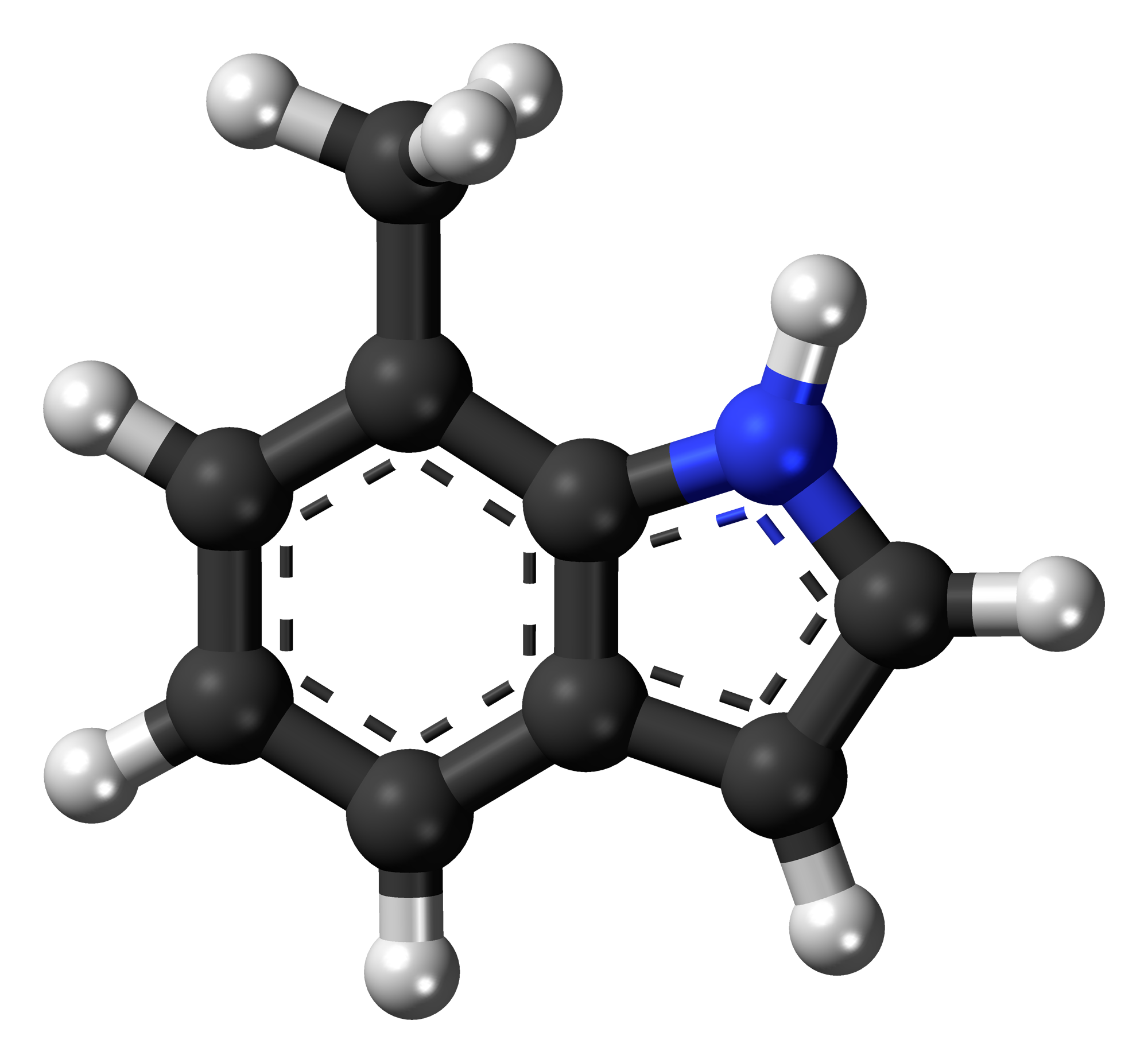

Names
- Preferred IUPAC name 7-Methyl-1H-indole

Identifiers
CAS Number	933-67-5
3D model (JSmol)	Interactive image; Interactive image
ChEMBL	ChEMBL326430
ChemSpider	63459
ECHA InfoCard	100.012.064
EC Number	213-270-1
PubChem CID	70275
UNII	7Z1E6HIT9S
CompTox Dashboard (EPA)	DTXSID60239374
- InChI: InChI=1S/C9H9N/c1-7-3-2-4-8-5-6-10-9(7)8/h2-6,10H,1H3 Key: KGWPHCDTOLQQEP-UHFFFAOYSA-N; InChI=1/C9H9N/c1-7-3-2-4-8-5-6-10-9(7)8/h2-6,10H,1H3 Key: KGWPHCDTOLQQEP-UHFFFAOYAX
- SMILES: CC1=C2C(C=CN2)=CC=C1; Cc1cccc2c1[nH]cc2

Properties
Chemical formula	C_{9}H_{9}N
Molar mass	131.178 g·mol^{−1}

Hazards
- GHS labelling
Pictograms	(GHS07: Exclamation mark)
Signal word	Warning
Hazard statements	H315, H319, H335
Precautionary statements	P261, P264, P271, P280, P302+P352, P304+P340, P305+P351+P338, P312, P321, P332+P313, P337+P313, P362, P403+P233, P405, P501
- Except where otherwise noted, data are given for materials in their standard state (at 25 °C [77 °F], 100 kPa). verify (what is ?) Infobox references

7-Methylindole is a mildly toxic off-white crystalline organic compound with chemical formula C_{9}H_{9}N.

== Preparation ==
7-Methylindole can be prepared from 2,6-dimethylformanilide by reaction with potassium ethoxide.

== Uses ==
7-Methylindole is used in the production of agricultural chemicals and pharmaceuticals.

== See also ==
- Indole
- Methyl
- 1-Methylindole
- 2-Methylindole (methylketol)
- 5-Methylindole
- Skatole (3-methylindole)
