= Hampshire pig =

American breed of pig

Hampshire
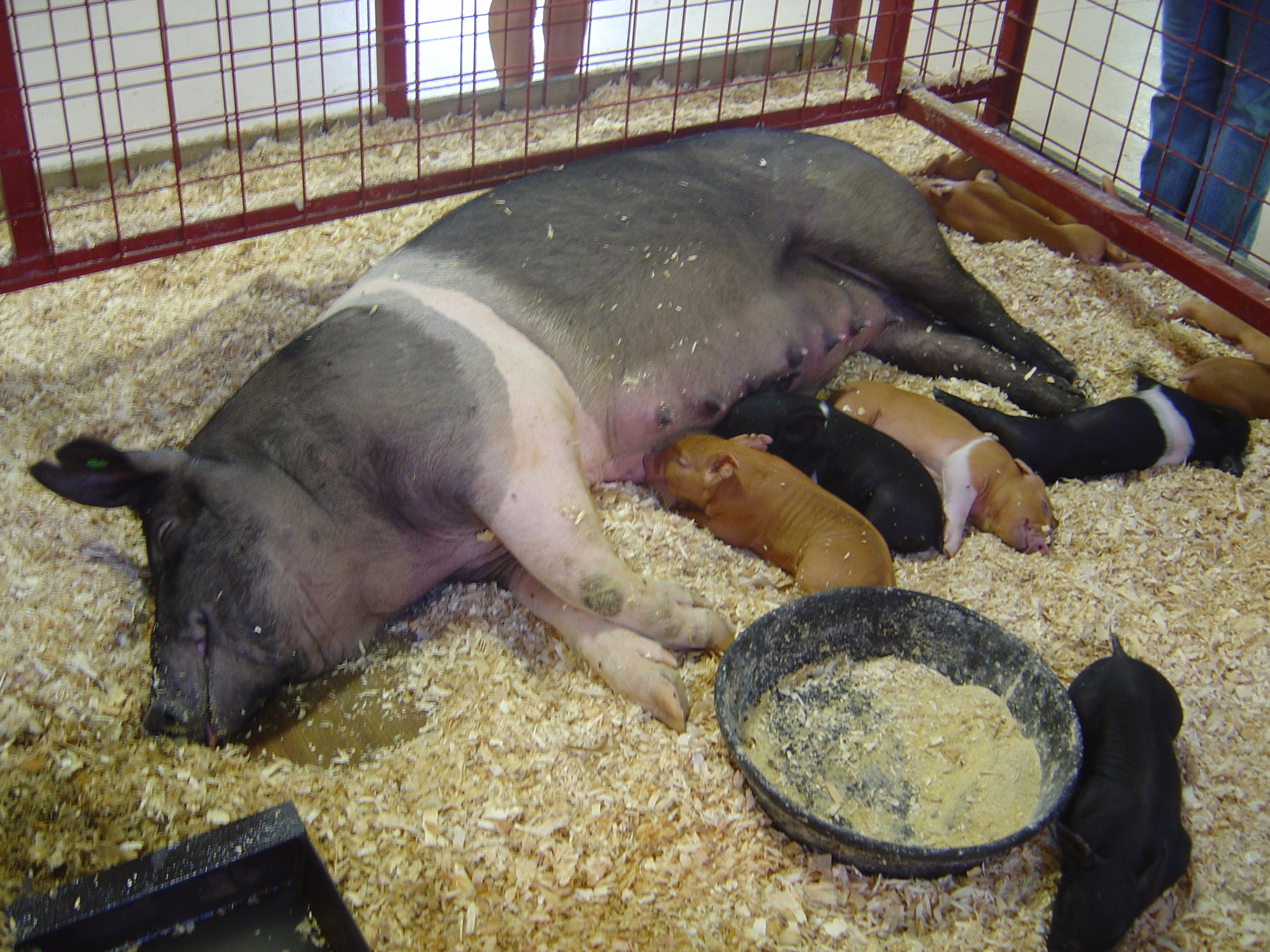
- Sow with cross-bred piglets
- Conservation status: FAO (2007): not at risk; DAD-IS (2024): nota at risk
- Country of origin: United States

Traits

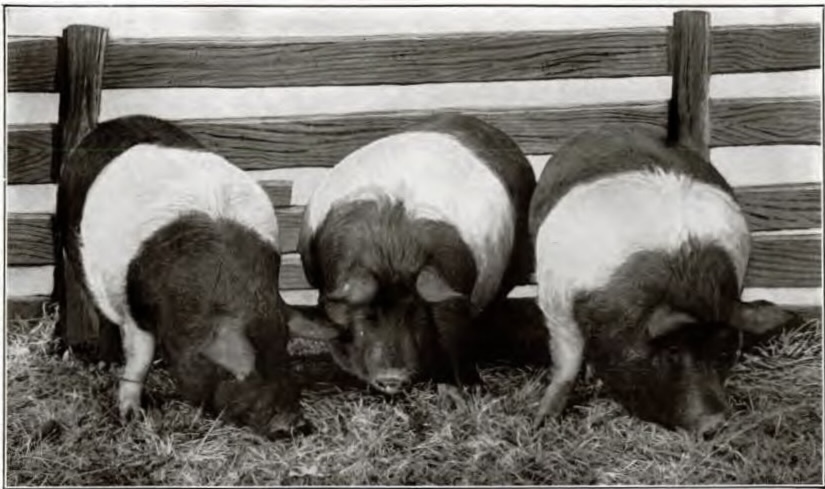
Barrows at the Chicago International Show in 1907

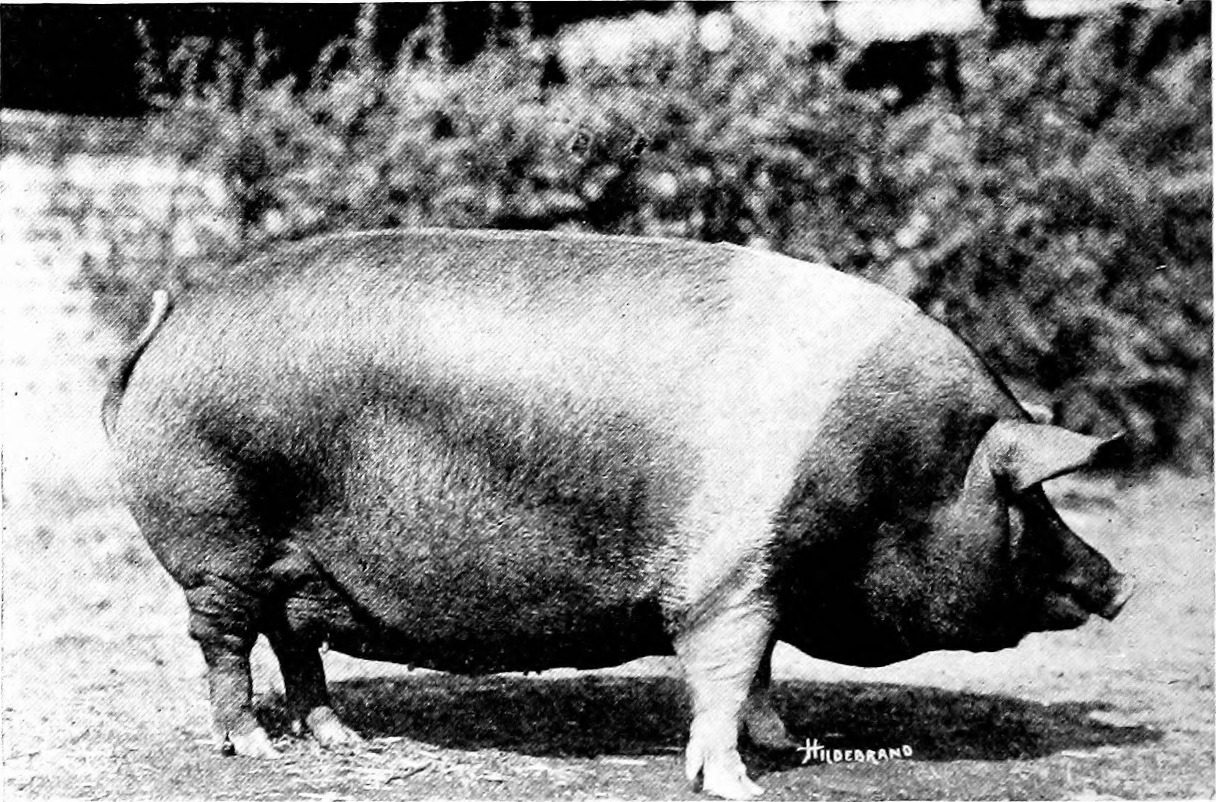
Champion sow, Iowa, 1914

The Hampshire is an American breed of domestic pig. It derives from saddlebacked pigs imported to Kentucky from about 1825 from the English county of Hampshire. It has a black body with a white band or sheet over the shoulders and extending down the front legs; the ears are erect.

== History ==
The Hampshire derives from pigs imported to Massachusetts between about 1820 and 1830 by a Captain John Mackay of Boston, a ship-owner. They were said to originate in the county of Hampshire in south-east England, and were initially known as Mackay Hogs; it is not certain that they were belted. Some of these were taken in 1835 from Pennsylvania to Kentucky by a Major Joel Garnet, where they came to be known as the Thin-Rind. A breed society, the American Thin-Rind Record Association, was formed in 1893, and in 1904 changed its name to become the American Hampshire Swine Record Association. The American Hampshire was not widespread at this time: a census in Indiana in 1907 found 337 head in a total of over 65000 in the state, while an estimate of the numbers of pure-bred pigs nationwide reported 3000 Hampshires in a total of just under 164000, in fifth place behind the Poland-China, the Duroc-Jersey, the American Berkshire and the Chester White.

In the twenty-first century it is among the most numerous pig breeds of the United States, where approximately three quarters of all registrations are of Duroc, American Yorkshire or Hampshire stock.

It has been exported to almost sixty countries, in all five inhabited continents. The total population reported world-wide is approximately 160000, of which over 20000 are in the United States; the largest population is in Argentina, where there are more than 125000 head. Its conservation status world-wide is "not at risk".

== Characteristics ==
It has a black body with a white band or sheet over the shoulders and extending down the front legs; the ears are erect.

== Use ==
Hampshire hogs are noted for being well-muscled and rapid growers, and for exhibiting good carcass quality when used as meat animals. When used as breeding stock, the sows of this breed have been praised for their capacity as mothers, having "extra longevity in the sow". Hampshires are good-tempered; they do not grow as fast as many cross-breds, but they do grow faster than American Yorkshires.
