= Duroc pig =

American breed of pig

Duroc
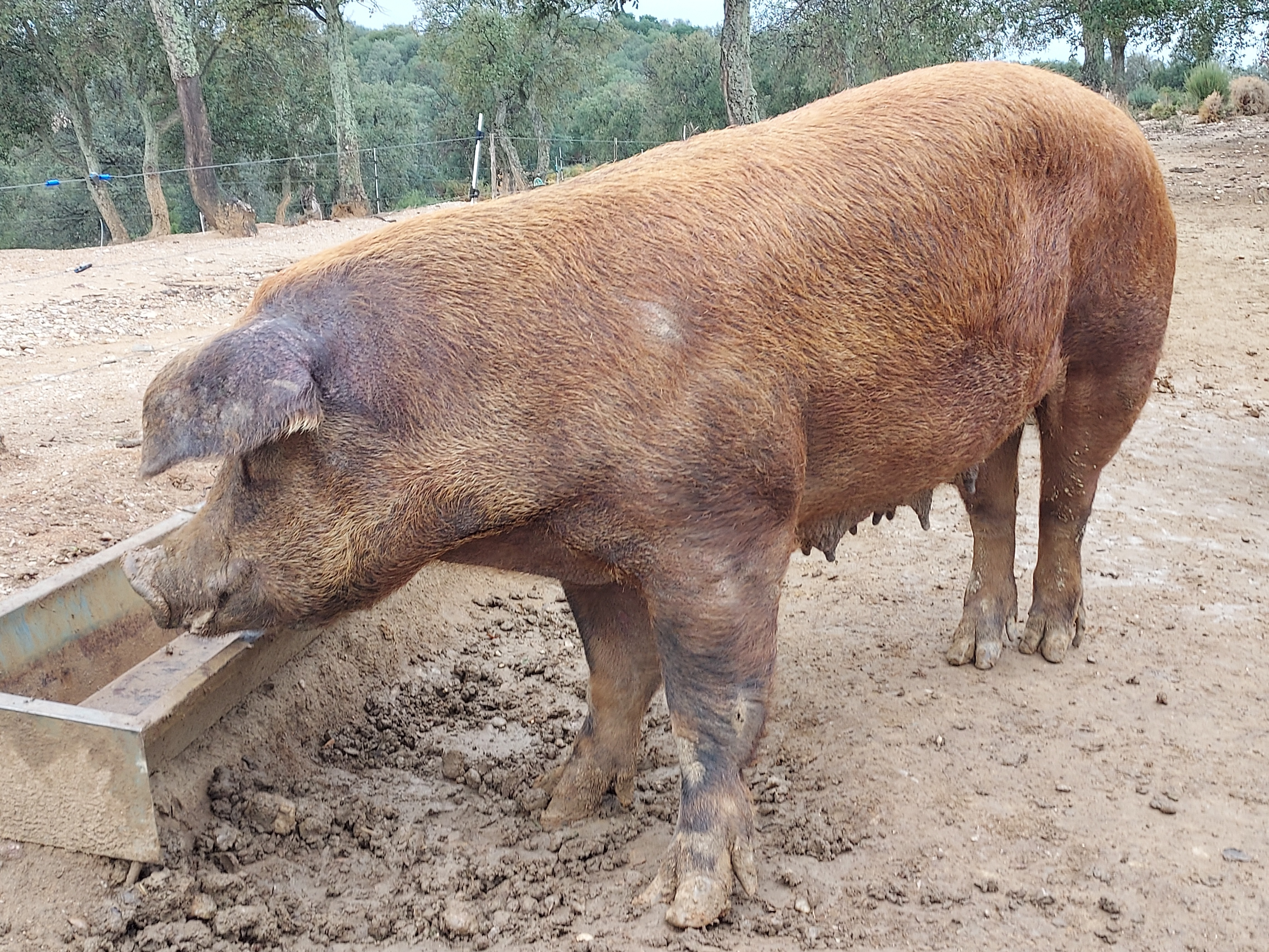
- Sow

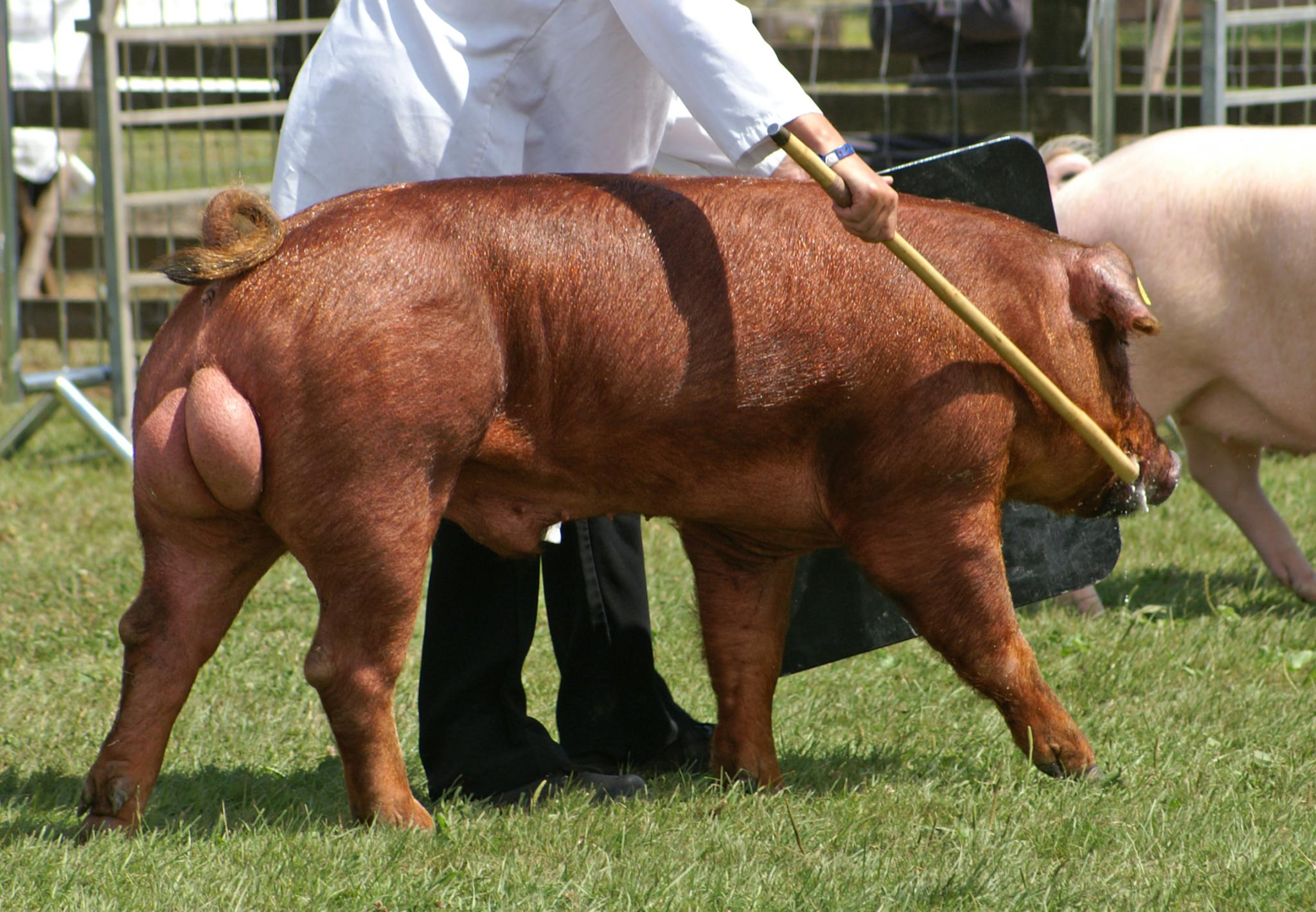
- Boar
- Conservation status: FAO (2007): not at risk; DAD-IS (2026: not at risk
- Other names: Duroc-Jersey
- Country of origin: United States
- Distribution: over 100 countries world-wide
- Use: pork

Traits

The Duroc is an American breed of domestic pig. It varies in color from golden to a dark reddish-brown; it is large-framed and muscular, of medium length, with partially-drooping ears.

== History ==
The breed, one of several red pig strains which developed around 1800 in New England, originated in Africa. One theory is that the pigs were imported from the Guinea coast of Africa at the time of the slave trade. Another suggestion is that the red color came from the Berkshire pig from Britain, a breed that is now black, but at that time was rusty brown. Another influence on the breed may have been four shoats from Spain and Portugal that were imported around 1837, but it is unclear whether these formed part of the breed's ancestry.

The breed is said to have been named for a stallion belonging to Harry Kelsey in New York state (1820s) or that "the breed was named after a race horse and he in turn was named after Napoleon's Aide, Gen. Christoph Duroc ...."

The modern Duroc originated circa 1850 from crosses of the Jersey Red and New York's older Duroc.

A complete pig genome was sequenced from clones of a Duroc sow at the University of Illinois in Urbana-Champaign in 2012.

The Duroc is distributed in many countries of the world, and in almost all of those where pigs are reared.. In 2026 it was reported by 108 countries, of which 32 also reported population numbers. The total number world-wide was estimated at slightly over 2.5 million; numbers over 100000 were reported by Argentina, China and Uganda, and numbers over 10000 were reported by Canada, Spain and the United States.

== Characteristics ==
Originally, the Duroc was a very large pig, but not as large as was the Jersey Red. Today, it is a medium-sized breed with a moderately long body and a slightly dished face. The ears are drooping and not held erect. The color is often an orangish-brown, but ranges from a light-golden shade to a deep mahogany-red. The weight of a mature boar is about 882 pounds, and the sow is about 772 pounds.

== Use ==
The breed started being used in shows around the 1950s. Durocs are predominantly kept for their meat, and are appreciated for their hardiness and quick but thorough muscle growth.
