= Lincolnshire Curly Coat =

Extinct breed of pig

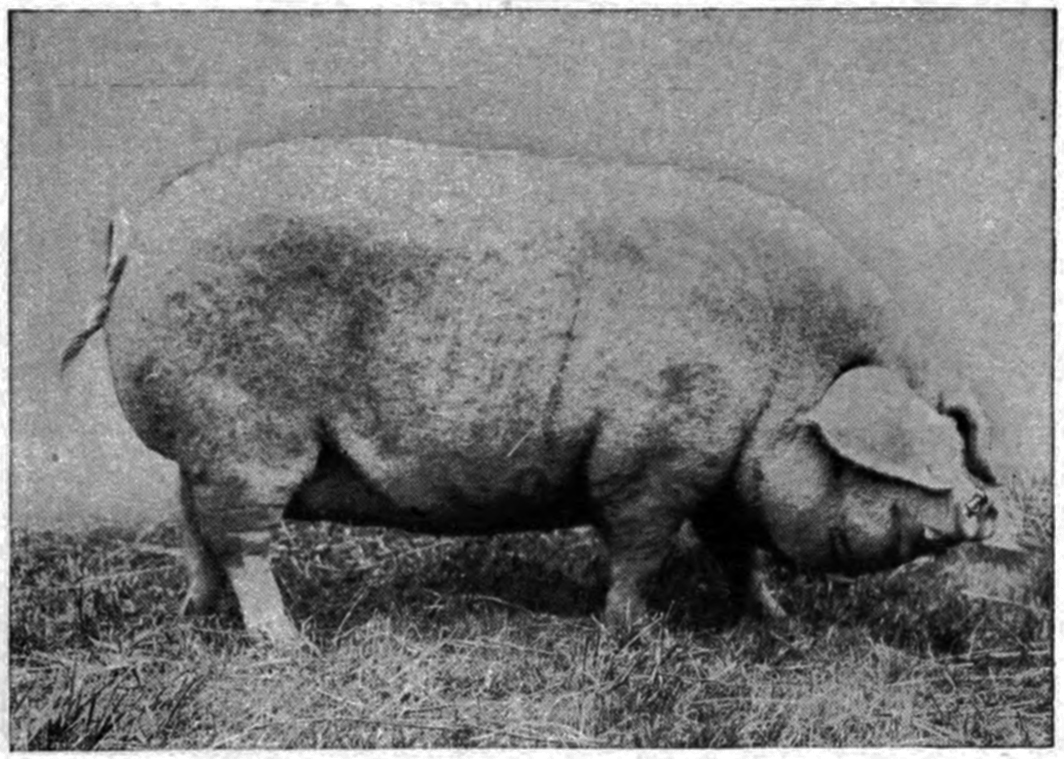
- Sow, photograph from 1928
- Conservation status: Extinct
- Other names: Lincolnshire Curly-coated; Baston Pig
- Country of origin: United Kingdom

Traits

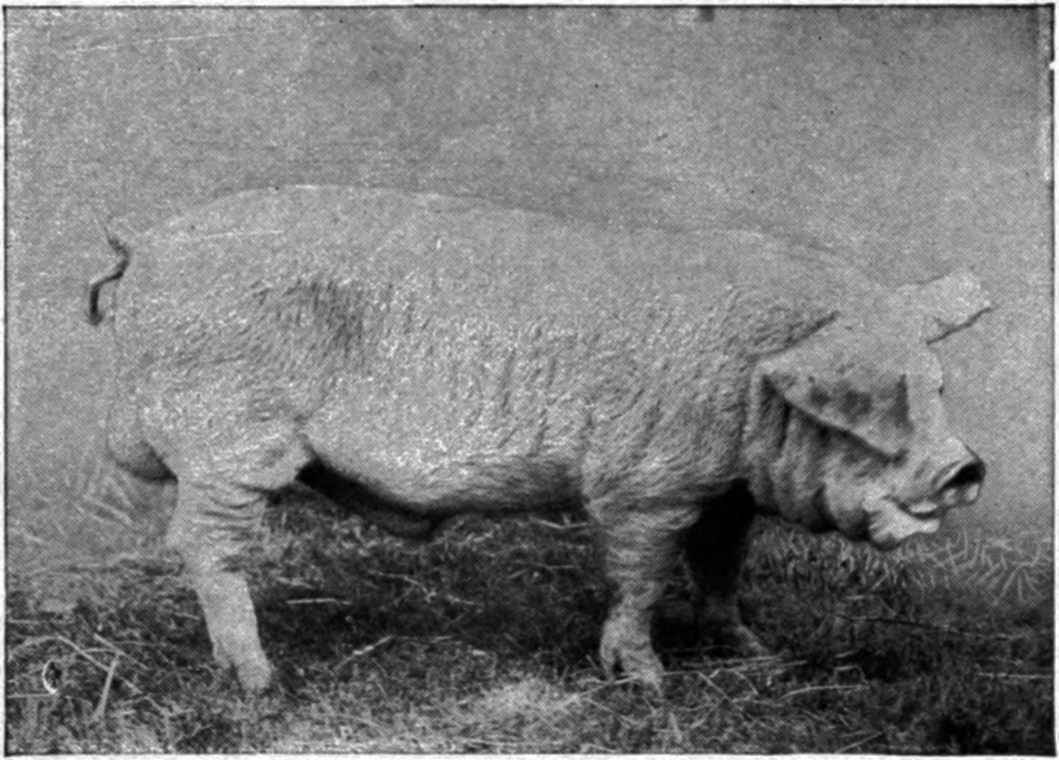
Boar, photograph from 1928

The Lincolnshire Curly Coat or Lincolnshire Curly-coated, also known as the Baston Pig, is an extinct British breed of domestic pig. It originated in, and was named for, the county of Lincolnshire, in the East Midlands. Like many other traditional pig breeds, it became rare after the Second World War. By 1970, it had disappeared. An older, still-existing breed of similar-looking pig is the Hungarian Mangalica.

== History ==
The Lincolnshire Curly Coat was one of the oldest breeds in the United Kingdom and was formerly common in its county of origin. It was traditionally reared mainly in coastal areas of Lincolnshire, inland from the North Sea about as far as the city of Lincoln and the towns of Grantham, Louth, and Spalding.

A Lincolnshire Curly-coated Pig Breeders' Association (with herd book) was started in 1906. By the 1930s, selective breeding had developed its fattening abilities, and large specimens were exported to Russia and other countries, including Hungary. The breed, however, dwindled in the period after the Second World War, possibly partly due to changing farming patterns and a taste for leaner meat. The principal cause of the decline was the publication in 1955 of the Howitt report, which found breed diversity to be a handicap to the pig industry in Britain, and established a policy of concentrating production on three breeds only: Welsh, the British Landrace, and the Large White. Of the 16 British pig breeds, four – the Cumberland, the Dorset Gold Tip, the Lincolnshire Curly Coat, and the Yorkshire Blue and White – became extinct. The Lincolnshire Curly Coat was the last of these to disappear; a survey conducted in 1970 by the University of Reading found none.

== Characteristics ==
The Lincolnshire Curly Coat, in common with other of the old "local" breeds in the United Kingdom, was bred to be tough and hardy, suitable for keeping by smallholders. It was a large pig with lop ears; its most prominent feature was its long, curly white coat, which helped it to weather the damp, cold winters of the Lincolnshire fens.
