= Pork in Ireland =

Pork in Ireland has been a key part of the Irish diet since prehistory. Ireland's flora and fauna overwhelmingly arrived via a Neolithic land bridge from Great Britain prior to its submerging around 12,000 BP. When the very first hunter-gatherers arrived around 2,000 years later, the local ecosystem largely resembled that of modern Ireland.

Dating back to Neolithic times, large amounts of pig bones have been found near habitations. There is evidence of wild boar consumption dating as early as 9000 BP, at a Mesolithic site in, about 1,000 years before farming began in Ireland.

Evidence of Stone Age farming survives in the Céide Fields in north County Mayo. Discovered in the 1930s, they are the world's oldest known extant field system and among the world's most extensive Stone Age ruins. Excavations of animal bones at the Newgrange site in County Meath in the 1960s confirmed that cattle and pigs were the primary food animals circa 4000 BP, with pig bones the more dominant of the two.

== Medieval Ireland ==
Pink and black in colour, "long-snouted, thin-spare, muscular, and active" the breed of pigs most commonplace in ancient Ireland were called greyhound pigs; woodland animals, they foraged on fallen acorns, hazelnuts, chestnuts and other natural foodstuffs abundantly available in a landscape almost entirely under forest. This breed remained the basis for virtually all Irish pig farming until supplanted by new breeds in the 20th century.

The Irish word for pig muc is closely linked with the Welsh equivalent mochyn and, further afield, the swine god worshipped by the ancient Continental Gauls Moccus. The wild boar has a significant place in Celtic iconography and Celtic myths, a telling example being the story of Diarmait and the Boar of Benn Gulbain. The role of pig-keepers (muccaid) in tales like The Contention of the Two Swineherds, and the Finding of the Rock of Cashel suggest a degree of importance. Stories like The Story of Mac Dá Thó's Pig, Bricriu's Feast and The Adventure of Cormac Grandson of Con seem to indicate likewise associations both with warrior-culture and hidden knowledge, though how much this reflected actual practice is debatable.

Pork, perhaps because it was so freely and widely available, was a mainstay of consumption in ancient Ireland. Large herds were kept by kings and other nobles as they required no expense in their upkeep "beyond the pay of a swineherd". With the coming of Christianity and literacy from the 4th century onward, written records throw light on contemporary social and agricultural practice in Ireland. St Patrick, who was captured as a slave by Irish pirates in the early 4th century AD herded pigs as well as sheep while a shepherd on Sliabh Mish.

The Brehon laws, Ireland's indigenous legal code, covered virtually almost every aspect of life and society. These were first written down in the 7th century and make frequent references to pigs and pigmeat both as a food item and a payment of tribute. The potential damage wrought by pigs, for example, was recognised as the most serious of all farm animals and "for the trespass of a large pig in a growing field of corn the fine was one sack of wheat."

Irish agricultural practice came under the scrutiny of the 12th century historian Giraldus Cambrensis who accompanied Henry II in the course of his invasion of Ireland in 1171. In his Topography of Ireland Giraldus notes the ubiquity of pigs in Irish life.

"In no part of the world are such vast herds of boars and wild pigs to be found,"

he wrote. Unimpressed by the greyhound pig he described it as "a small, ill-shaped and cowardly breed, no less degenerate in boldness and ferocity than in their shape and size."

Over 500 years later, the number of pigs in Ireland would continue to surprise observers. In 1780, one observer commented "hogs are kept in such numbers that the little towns and villages swarm with them".

== Early modern Ireland ==
Throughout the centuries, pigmeat invariably featured in any description of the Irish life and the Irish diet, particularly among ordinary people. Town bye-laws frequently regulate the keeping of pigs. In 1382, the citizens of Waterford agreed that any pig found wandering of the streets could be immediately killed by the specially appointed pig wardens. Writing in the 17th century one English observer commented of the "wild… mere Irish" that "they devour great morsels of beef unsalted, and they eat commonly swine’s flesh, seldom mutton."

Over the period 1500 to 1800, the Irish landscape gradually underwent a process of deforestation which, among other consequences, eliminated the natural habitat of the wild boar.

Although pork remained important to the Irish diet, from the 18th century onward, a new political climate saw the export of food become a significant economic priority. "Much [Irish] pork and bacon did not enter the Irish market, but was exported. Shipments of pork and bacon soared after 1760, probably at the expense of domestic consumption." Evidence of domestic records from households in Ireland in the late 18th century also confirms that pigmeat, previously cheap and plentiful, had become more expensive than other meats at this time, and that meat in general was a considerably more expensive commodity in Ireland than in Britain.

In 1841, on the eve of the Famine, the number of pigs in Ireland was put at 1.4 million, and the link between pigs and the small farmer and the poor was demonstrated by the collapse in pig numbers to just over half a million by 1848.

== 18th and 19th centuries ==
Throughout the 18th century, Ireland was a major exporter of pork, along with other commodities such as beef, butter and cheese. The principal routes of export were through Limerick, Waterford and Cork, which were also important centres of pork production, and the principal markets were Britain, the supply of British interests in 'the Atlantic' as well as the Royal Navy itself.

The 'Atlantic' market for Irish pork waned in the last decades of the 18th century as other countries such as the USA entered the market. However, in the 19th century, with the emergence of a commercial pork sector, Ireland was once again an important supplier to the British market. In 1860, it was noted that "live animals and bacon now provide the staple of the Irish provision trade… Waterford produces nearly two thirds of the Irish bacon imported into London". A growing export trade was fuelled by the industrial and agricultural revolutions that took place in the 18th and 19th centuries, as a more scientific approach to breeding transformed levels of productivity. Meanwhile, a growing urban population in the UK encouraged producers to take advantage of new technologies to accelerate production. In the mid-19th century, successful efforts were made to improve the quality of the greyhound pig through better feeding and housing and through cross breeding with English breeds such as the Large Yorkshire. The development of the Large White Ulster pig was one of the most successful outcomes of this interbreeding process and was the principal pig breed in the province of Ulster in the first part of the 20th century. The Tamworth, a breed which although it originated at Tamworth, Staffordshire in 1812 was also the result of interbreeding of the traditional Irish pig breed with an existing herd, however it never found significant popularity in Ireland. Today, of all commercial breeds, the Tamworth is considered to be among closest to the original wild boars that roamed European forests.

== Innovation in the late 19th and early 20th centuries ==
Munster, being the most significant dairying region of Ireland, was also one of the most important areas for pork production as buttermilk made an excellent feed for pigs. Irish pork producers embraced innovation in the course of the late 19th century. In 1862, when a new method of curing bacon was developed it was immediately employed by Irish pork processors. Similar advances were made in breeding. In 1887, the Bacon Curers' Pig Improvement Association was established and played a central role in popularising the Large White Ulster breed across Munster. In 1820, Henry Denny began business as a provisions merchant in Waterford and, over the following decades, patented a number of production methods of bacon as well as establishing of the Denny 'star' brand in Britain. In 1880s, Henry's son Edward established pork processing plants in Germany, Denmark and America with Denny technological expertise in particular helping the Danish bacon industry to develop. Another large Irish pork processor of the era, O'Mara's, meanwhile set up bacon curing facilities in Russia in 1891.

The famous Limerick cured ham was also developed around this era. According to a 1902 document from the Department of Agriculture, it came about largely by accident: '1880... Limerick producers were short of money...they produced what was considered meat in a half cured condition. The unintentional cure proved extremely popular and others followed suit.' The decreasing use of salt was additionally supported by advances in technology and transport which meant pork did not need to be stored at ambient temperatures for a long period of time. Recognising the change in tastes that favoured mild cure, Alexander Shaw commented in 1902 that 'the hard cured bacon of former days would [today] be looked on as akin to Lot's wife.'

One of the by-products of an export-oriented commercial pork industry was the plentiful availability of cheaper cuts to the local populace. In the major Irish production centres such as Limerick, Waterford and particularly Cork, crubeens (pigs totters), drisheen (blood pudding) and tripe were staples of the local diet throughout the 19th and much of the 20th centuries as a result of their plentiful availability. Key brands established in the 19th and early 20th century such as Denny, Galtee, Roscrea and Shaw's remain today among the leading pork, bacon and sausage brands in Ireland. All are owned by Irish food company Kerry Group, which also owns the UK sausage brand Richmond. Richmond Irish sausages has the largest number of sausages sold by any company in the UK. Denny's sausages receive a mention in James Joyce's Ulysses. 'And a pound and a half of Denny's sausages...The ferreteyed porkbutcher folded the sausages he had snipped off with blotchy fingers, sausage pink' and the company also claims to have invented the skinless sausage in 1941.

== Pork as a part of rural life ==
In 2008, the Taste Council of Ireland undertook an oral history project Lost and forgotten skills in rural Ireland in which interviewees reflected on food skills which had largely died out in the course of the modernisation of Ireland in the latter part of the 20th century.

Interviewees reflected that...

pigs were routinely kept in even the smallest of farms. A few would be kept for the family's own use with others reared and sold on. There would normally be two kills on the farm per year, one in April and one in October.

To begin the home slaughter of pigs, a tub of brine was prepared and covered. The pigs would be killed on site by the man of the house, with blood drained into an enamel dish for his wife to make blood pudding (she would also take the intestine, which was rinsed out to hold the pudding). Entrails were removed and the liver and kidneys would be saved. The head would be removed and boiled for hours to salvage whatever was possible.
Salt was fundamental to the curing of pork, not only to preserve the meat but to eliminate pathogens. Split down the middle, the sides of the pig would be set on a bench and handfuls of salt rubbed in, first on the flesh side and then the skin side. Often, two people would be involved, and hours would be spent ensuring the sides were thoroughly salted – around 4lbs of salt for each flank. Laid then on the floor, skin-side down, often on a bed of straw, sacking or jute would then be thrown over and, after a few days, the salt would be further trampled in by men standing on the jute. Hung up on hooks with sacking over, portions were cut off as required. Pork/bacon could also be smoked in the chimney. Hanging sides of pork would be wrapped in muslin to keep off flies.

When the pig was stunned and the throat slit, an enamel basin or bucket was used to catch the blood drained from the pig. Salt was added to prevent coagulation. Intestines were washed in running water. Oatmeal was mixed in, along with some herbs and spices, salt and pepper. Sometimes using a funnel, the mixture was then fed into the intestine, cut and tied at lengths of a foot, put on a tray and steamed over hot water for several hours. The lengths of pudding were then left out into the 'dairy' or outhouse and sliced off for frying at suppertime as required.

The taste of home-made pudding was said by all respondents to be incomparable to the manufactured alternative. Those few respondents who still make it the traditional way report huge demand among friends and neighbours.

== 20th century ==
The evolution of modern farming in Ireland in the 20th century is closely linked to the activities of Horace Plunkett, founder of the co-operative movement and the Department of Agriculture and Technical Instruction for Ireland in 1899.

As the co-operative movement evolved largely to support dairy farming and butter production in the early part of the 20th century, it was natural that pig farming would continue to develop alongside it as the by-products of dairy (whey from cheese and casein production, and skim milk) provided an excellent and cheap source of feed for pigs. Significant pork production facilities were established, for example, in the town of Mitchelstown, County Cork, which was also a major centre of dairy and cheese production.

The modern pig industry began to take shape from the 1960s, when the first large pig units were developed and coincided with introduction of the Landrace breed, which had its origins in Denmark, from the 1950s onward. The Landrace and the Large White are, today, the dominant breed of pig in commercial production in Ireland. In the decades 1960 to 1990, a government breeding programme brought about rapid improvements in carcass leanness in both, a process further supported by importation of high-quality breeding stock.

From the 1990s onward, a new breeding model has emerged reflecting the disappearance of traditional small breeders and the large-scale uptake of artificial insemination (AI) in the commercial sector. The majority of pig units now use almost 100 per cent AI. Internationally, there are three main models for pig production: vertical integration; co-operative ownership; and independent producer. The majority of pig production units in Ireland are of the third kind, independently operated and family owned.

As of 2006, there were approximately 440 commercial pig units in Ireland, of which some 290 were fully integrated breeding to finishing units. Areas where pig production is particularly concentrated include County Cavan, County Cork and South Tipperary. Though pig farming is, in the majority of cases, a farm-family operated business it is also predominantly a specialised undertaking, i.e., the sole or main enterprise on the farm.

Five major pig producing counties of Ireland (2006)*
County	Quantity (sows)
Cavan	40,000
Cork	38,000
Tipperary	14,000
Waterford	9,000
Longford	7,700

- Source: Bord Bia Irish Food Board

== Irish pork and pigmeat industry today ==
The Irish pork and pigmeat industry is the third most important agricultural sector in Ireland, ranking third in Gross Agricultural Output (GAO) after beef and dairy and employing an estimated 7,500 people. Figures from 2006 put pigmeat as amounting to about 6% of GAO in contrast to dairy (30%), beef (25%) and sheep (4%). Approximately 50 per cent of domestic production is exported, with the UK the most important of almost 50 markets worldwide.

In 1989, the introduction of the Pigmeat Quality Assurance Scheme (PQAS in Ireland established a series of measures and controls which all participating pig farmers undertake as best practice in their pigmeat production.

Among the areas included in the farm requirements are:

- Stockmanship and training
- Pig welfare: housing, temperature, ventilation, feed and water
- Herd health: maintenance and control
- Transport: pig haulier code of practice
- Health and safety on the farm
- Environmental protection

The scheme is regularly revisited and updated. In 1997, it was substantially revised to incorporate new developments in International Quality Management Systems, Hazard Analysis and Critical Control Points (HACCP) and EU Food Hygiene Legislation while, in 2007, it was further revised and accredited to the EN45011 standard. Updates in the 2007 revision include farm inspections carried out by qualified independent auditors. Forty Irish pork processing plants, representing the vast majority of Irish processing facilities, and all exporters are part of the Scheme. In addition to meeting regulatory requirements, the scheme lays down additional standards to be complied with at each step of the production chain.

Ireland has a low density of pig production when compared to the larger pig producing regions across Europe. Irish pig producers finish their pigs at lower carcase weights compared to most countries across Europe. As a result, Irish producers do not castrate their male pigs. Castration is carried out across most of Europe as male pigs are generally brought to heavier carcase weights and, without castration, 'boar taint' may become an issue. Boar taint refers to the unpleasant odour and flavour characteristics noted in pork derived from male boars as they reach sexual maturity. Taint is only found in a small minority of boars and can be found in sows as it is actually caused by two different chemicals, one produced in the male testes and the other produced in the intestines.

As the castration of pigs has also become an animal welfare issue across Europe, non-castration is considered a double advantage, as it benefits the welfare of the animal and entire boars produce leaner and better quality meat. Taint can be controlled through breeding away from the few lines that have it (genetics), feed management (higher fibre) and housing management (out on pasture instead of confinement).

== 2008 pork recall ==
On 6 December 2008, as a precautionary measure, the Food Safety Authority initiated a product recall of all Irish pork and bacon products which had been produced since 1 September 2008. This was due to the presence of dioxin in a small sample of Irish pork and bacon products which was confirmed on Saturday, 6 December. The Department of Agriculture, Fisheries and Food (DAFF) identified the source of the contaminant as one animal feed plant which had supplied 10 Irish pig farms which, in turn, account for 8 per cent of the total supply of pigs in Ireland.

Restrictions were immediately placed on these farms to prohibit their animals from entering the food chain. According to the Chief Medical Officer in the Department of Health and Children, "Any risk that arises to health from having consumed Irish pork products prior to the product recall is extremely low and the public should not be concerned". This was a view endorsed by the European Food Safety Authority, and the UK Food Standards Agency.

Irish pork and bacon products returned to the shelves four days after the recall, with a new label authorised by DAFF confirming the products were free from any contaminant. The pork recall generated considerable publicity around the world and the actions of the Food Safety Authority of Ireland (FSAI) in instigating a complete recall, in spite of the financial implications to the sector, were widely praised. According to one BBC commentator "the episode has shown the Irish food industry is really about food safety even where it demands painful disclosure and economic loss."

The impact on the sales of Irish pork and bacon products in the key UK market in 2009 were subsequently described as "slight and temporary" with trade figures up to August 2009 showing a year-on-year rise of 9 per cent. Imports countries worldwide quickly returned to sourcing Irish pork, with all but China to lift their suspension, with progress expected there by mid-2010.

== Irish consumption of pork ==
Potatoes, bacon and cabbage remain today the 'national dish of Ireland' and, while no longer ubiquitous, forms the standard fare of many Irish dinner tables and food service outlets.

A traditional Irish breakfast consists of sausages, black and white pudding, bacon and fried eggs, with additional elements depending on local traditions and personal taste such as toast, fried potato bread, fried tomatoes, mushrooms and even liver.

A modern adaptation of this, widely available in Irish convenience stores, is the breakfast roll. Reflecting its popularity, and the enduring place of pork in the Irish diet, "breakfast roll man" was the name given by economic commentator David McWilliams to a significant segment of Irish workers who enjoyed affluence in the late Celtic Tiger years.

Per capita consumption of pig meat in Ireland is 38.4 kg per year and is significantly greater than any other meat.

Per capita consumption of meat in Ireland (2002)
Meat	Kg per person
Pigmeat	38.3
Poultry	30.5
Beef	17.5
Sheep	5.2
Other	1.6
Total	93.1

== See also ==
- Scottish pork taboo
