= Essex pig =

Breed of pig

Essex
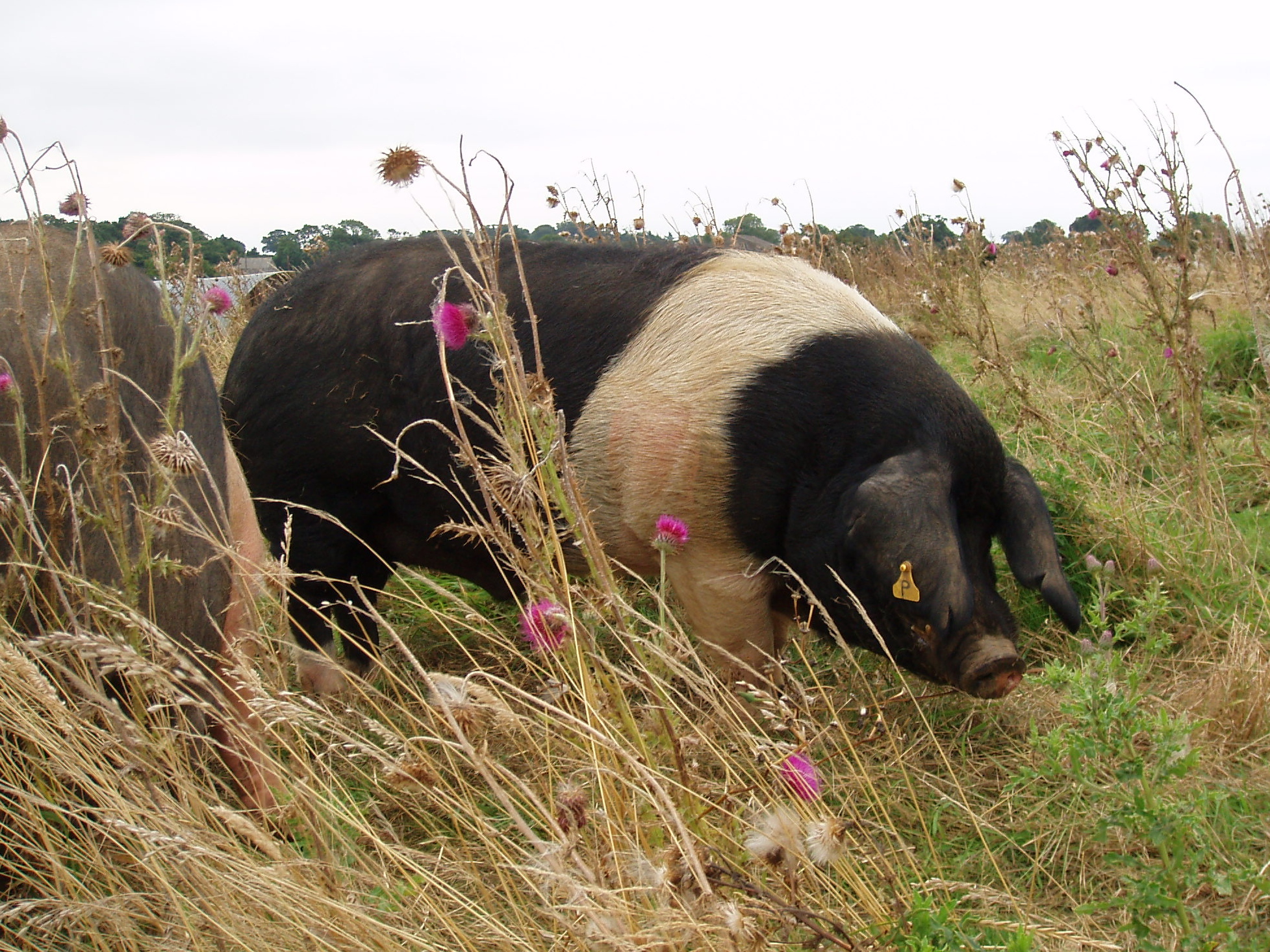
- An Essex boar
- Country of origin: United Kingdom

Traits

The Essex is a breed of domestic pig originating in the United Kingdom.

== Characteristics ==
The Essex, in its traditional form, was a smallish pig with 'pricked' ears and a black ground colour, with a broad band of white 'sheeting' across the shoulders.

== History ==
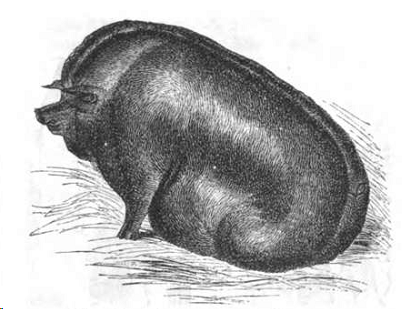
Essex boar at the 1843 Royal Agricultural Show in Derby

Like other old British pig breeds, the ancestor of the Essex may have originated in the county of the same name from selective breeding of local wild pigs. It was originally a smallish, "coarse" black-and-white pig that was noted for being easy to keep and cheap to feed, qualities that ensured its popularity with smallholders. The Old Essex, as it came to be known, was deliberately "improved" in the mid 19th century by crossing it with imported pigs. In the early nineteenth century, while travelling in Italy, Charles Western, 1st Baron Western obtained Neapolitan pigs to cross with his Essex sows. One of his tenants, Fisher Hobbs, bred the resulting Neapolitan-Essex boars with his "coarse" Essex sows and established the Improved Essex. In 1840 an Improved Essex boar and sow, both bred by Hobbs, each took first prize in its class at the second show of the Royal Agricultural Society at Cambridge.

The Essex pig remained locally popular until as recently as the mid-1950s, and had actually increased in numbers during the Second World War and immediately afterwards, based on its reputation for hardiness and its ability to feed itself by foraging. In 1954, 488 Essex boars (2% of the total British stock) were still licensed, and 3,716 sows registered.

The position of the Essex breed changed markedly after the publication of a 1955 report by the Advisory Committee on the Development of Pig Production in the United Kingdom, chaired by Sir Harold Howitt. The report, issued after the end of wartime rationing, expressed concern that the UK's pig farms were poorly placed to compete with European and Scandinavian pork and bacon producers, particularly those of Denmark, and identified that the wide variety of local breeds still used in the UK hampered development. It was therefore recommended that pig farmers concentrate on three breeds: the Welsh, the Landrace, and the Large White, and as a result the Essex pig went into a steep decline.

While the breed societies of the Wessex (another breed featuring a black ground colour and white shoulder markings, although with a different origin) and Essex pigs had amalgamated as early as 1918, the formal end of the Essex pig came in 1967, when the stud books were also amalgamated with the intention of merging the two breeds into the British Saddleback. This was intended to improve the breed's characteristics, produce hybrid vigour, and prevent inbreeding in the remaining small herds. For many years the Essex pig was considered to have become extinct in 1967, although it was thought a few pure-bred individuals might survive on small farms.

== Re-creation of the breed ==
Later research showed that one farmer, John Croshaw, had refused to amalgamate his herd of Essex pigs (the "Glascote Herd"), which retained a pure Essex bloodline despite being officially registered as British Saddlebacks: Croshaw had carefully managed his stock to avoid inbreeding.
