= Bacon and Hams =

1917 book by George J. Nicholls

- Author: George J. Nicholls
- Language: English
- Subject: Bacon
- Genre: Non-fiction
- Publisher: Institute of Certificated Grocers (Note: now the Institute of Grocery Distribution)
- Publication date: 1917
- Publication place: United Kingdom
- OCLC: 18696679

Bacon and Hams is a 1917 book by George J. Nicholls, a member of the Institute of Certificated Grocers. The book details the then-modern bacon and ham industry beginning with the use of the pig breeds, meat processing and the distribution and pricing of cuts with a focus on the United Kingdom. The meat processing aspects focus on the popular Wiltshire cut of the time, but also includes American cuts as well. The book was described, with approbation, by the Saskatchewan Overseas Livestock Marketing Commission, as an "admirable and important treatise". Despite having entered the public domain, the book is rare and collectible and generated interest for its "unparalleled" anatomical details of pigs found in its fold-out pages.

A 2009 review called it a "paean to the pig".

== Author ==
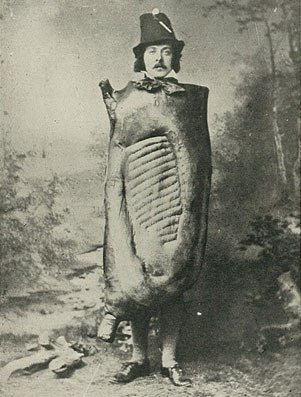
"The Author in Fancy Dress as a Side of Bacon, designed by himself, which took the First Prize of Forty Guineas at the Covent Garden Fancy Dress Ball, April 1894."

According to the title page of the book, George J. Nicholls was the director of George Bowles, Nicholls & Company. He was also a Trustee, Member of Council, Chairman of Finance Committee, and honorary Examiner to the Institute of Certificated Grocers. He was also a member of the Home and Foreign Produce Exchange and Chairman of Committee of the Wholesale Produce Merchants' Association in London. Nicholls followed in the footsteps of his father in the provision trade and hoped that two of his three sons would continue the family tradition. The book features a studio photograph of its author in fancy dress as a side of bacon.

== Terminology ==
The term bacon in this book does not refer to the sliced and pre-packaged bacon that is ubiquitous in American markets, but instead the cured whole side of the pig. Furthermore, the differences between bacon in the United States and in the United Kingdom are quite pronounced, and the book refers only to cuts common in the United Kingdom. The cut that is used to produce "American bacon" is a cut referred to as "streaky bacon" in the United Kingdom. Most bacon consumed in the United Kingdom is known as back bacon and consists of both pork belly and pork loin in a single cut. The Wiltshire cut was a way to divide up the meat, and was marketed to consumers in still further cuts.

== Content ==
This book's target audience is not the common consumer of pig meat, but the grocer who would sell the products to the masses. The goal of the book was to aid in the proper handling, selling and profiting from the business of selling pork. Furthermore, Nicholls noted that this book would come to fill a need for the students who would be taking the Institute of Certificated Grocer exams.

The book is divided into nine chapters with seven appendices. The first chapter details the pig and its use in antiquity before summarizing the nutrient components of pork in comparison to beef. The second chapter opens with the defining characteristics of a good bacon pig. The six principal breeds of the United Kingdom at the time were the Large White Yorkshire, the Middle White, the Tamworth, the Berkshire, the Lincolnshire Curly-Coated and the Large Black. The Large White Yorkshire breed is traced to Robert Bakewell and highlights the importance of the breed for its quick maturity, rapid fattening and providing a long side. Though also credited for the breeding of the Small White pig, Bakewell was secretive in his work and evidence of his pig breeding (as a whole) cannot be confirmed. Nicholls describes the other breeds and provides information on the number of pigs, the state of the industry and the classification of pigs for the market.

The third chapter details the industry outside the United Kingdom. The fourth chapter discusses the current practices of the bacon factory, including the stages in which the pigs are received, killed, branded and processed. The usage of the entire carcass is covered, from the blood to the fat and hair of the pig. Chapter five details the distribution and wholesale centers of the industry and the terms and regulations used. Chapter six details the selection and grading of the cuts, beginning with the most popular Wiltshire cut. Chapter seven and eight details the retail distribution of the bacon, and dividing the Wiltshire cut into different cuts and pricing. Chapter nine concludes with the retail distribution of the American and Canadian cuts. The book includes fold-out anatomical charts that were popular during the time.

== Release and recognition ==
The "unparalleled fold-out pig"

Bacon and Hams was first published in 1917 by the Institute of Certificated Grocers and printed by Richard Clay & Sons of London. A second edition was published in 1924. The book was referred to with approbation by the Saskatchewan Overseas Livestock Marketing Commission which described it as an "admirable and important treatise". Though the book has entered the public domain, it is rare and collectible. The website Cooking Issues featured the obscure book, creating an interactive Adobe Flash animation of Nicholls's "unparalleled fold-out pig".

== See also ==
- Cut of beef
