= British Saddleback =

British breed of pig

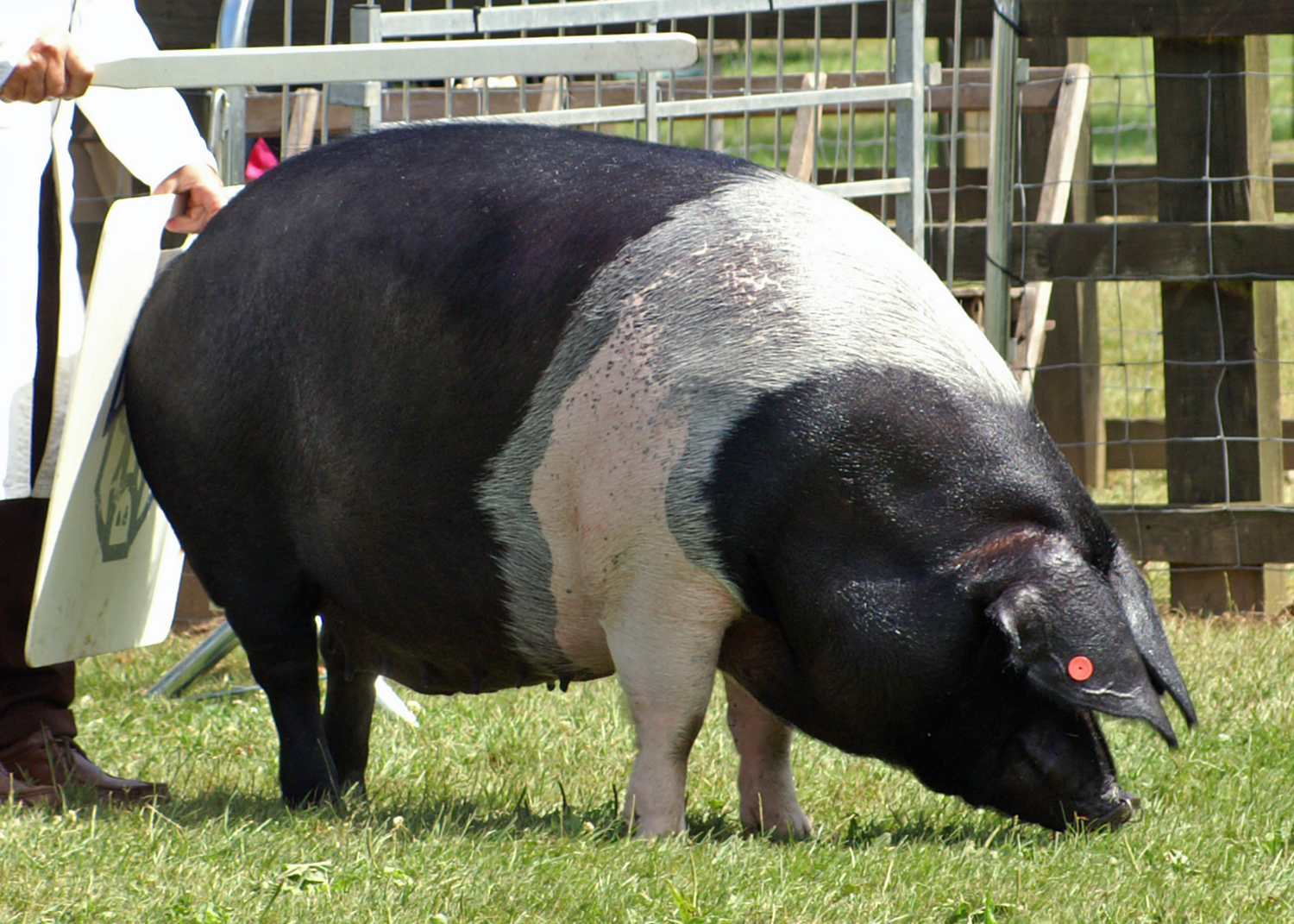
- Sow, judged Best of Breed at the Royal Show at Stoneleigh in Warwickshire in 2009
- Conservation status: FAO (2007): endangered-maintained; DAD-IS (2022): at risk/endangered; RBST (2022–2023): at risk
- Country of origin: United Kingdom
- Standard: British Pig Association
- Use: dual-purpose, pork and bacon

Traits
- Weight: Male: 320 kg; Female: 270 kg

The British Saddleback is a modern British breed of domestic pig. It was created in 1967 by merging the surviving populations of two traditional saddleback breeds, the Essex and Wessex Saddleback. It is an endangered breed, listed on the watchlist of the Rare Breeds Survival Trust as at risk, the second-highest level of concern.

== History ==
The British Saddleback was created in 1967 by merging the remaining populations of two quite different traditional saddleback breeds, the Essex and the Wessex Saddleback, into a single herd-book. Both breeds had declined following the publication of the Howitt report in 1955, which found breed diversity to be a handicap to the pig industry in Britain, and established a policy of concentrating production on three breeds only: the Welsh, the British Landrace and the Large White.

During the Second World War some 47% of pedigree sow registrations were from the Essex and Wessex breeds. In 1949 there were 2435 licensed Essex and Wessex boars, almost 25% of the total number. By 1954 the two breeds accounted for no more than 22% of sow registrations and fewer than 10% of registered boars. The recommendation of the time was to cross-breed saddleback sows with a white boar to produce a dual-purpose pig, for both pork and bacon production.

The British Saddleback was listed as "endangered-maintained" by the Food and Agriculture Organization of the United Nations in 2007. In 2016 the Rare Breeds Survival Trust listed it as a "minority breed" rather than a rare breed. In 2012 the population was reported to be 882; by 2019 that figure had fallen to 378. In 2022 the breed was listed in DAD-IS as at risk/endangered, and in the 2022–2023 watchlist of the Rare Breeds Survival Trust its conservation status was given as at risk, the second-highest level of concern.

Saddlebacks have been exported to Bhutan, Brazil, Indonesia, the Leeward Islands, Nepal, Nigeria, the Russian Federation, the Seychelles and the Solomon Islands.

== Characteristics ==
The British Saddleback is large and deep in the body. It is black with a white saddle, sheet or band round the withers, shoulders and front legs; some white is allowed on the nose, tail and hind feet. It is lop-eared. The coat is fine, straight and silky.

== Use ==
The British Saddleback is hardy and forages well, and is suitable for extensive management. It is a dual-purpose breed, used for the production of both pork and bacon. It is among the most prolific of British pig breeds, with an average litter size of approximately 10; sows have good maternal qualities.
