= Cumberland pig =

Breed of pig

Cumberland
- Conservation status: Extinct
- Country of origin: England

Traits

The Cumberland was a breed of domestic pig that originated in the North of England; it was used to produce local delicacies like the Cumberland sausage and Cumberland ham. The breed became extinct in 1960, after changes in farming methods and a demand for less fatty meat led to it falling out of favour.

== History and characteristics ==
The Cumberland was a very old breed that likely developed over several hundred years in Cumberland and Westmorland, and was closely related to the Old Yorkshire white pig. It was a heavy-set white animal with pendulous ears, and had a tough constitution enabling it to withstand the poor weather of Northern England. The breed grew quickly to above-average size, with a high fat content.

During the 19th century, many efforts were made to 'improve' pig breeds, and the Cumberland was often crossed with the Yorkshire white breeds. These eventually developed into the Large White, Small White and Middle White. The Cumberland Pig Breeders' Association was created in 1916, and the breed reached a height of popularity during the 1920s.

The Cumberland began to fall out of favour in the mid-20th century due to a demand for leaner meat. In 1955, the Advisory Committee on the Development of Pig Production in the United Kingdom, chaired by Sir Harold Howitt, issued a report that pig farmers in the UK, to ensure standardisation, should concentrate on three breeds: the Large White, Welsh, and Landrace. By this time, the Cumberland stock was already dwindling; only three boars were licensed by 1954.

The Cumberland pig is considered to have become extinct in 1960 after the last individual, a sow belonging to a Mr. Thirwall, died on Bothel Craggs farm in Bothel.

== Re-creation ==
In 2008, a Penrith animal conservation centre "recreated" the Cumberland pig based on DNA analysis and selective breeding; farmers who had worked with the last surviving originals agreed that the new pig was a good match in appearance. It is hoped that the new pigs resulting from the programme will in future be a source of authentic Cumberland hams and sausages: however, whilst the Rare Breeds Survival Trust commented that they appreciated the project, they stated they would not recognise the breed as a true Cumberland pig.

In 2008, after years of selective breeding, a sow was born with a 99.6% DNA match for the Cumberland. However, it proved infertile.

The original Cumberland pig's genetic heritage is also present in the Middle White and possibly in the Chester White breed of the United States.

== See also ==
- Oxford Sandy and Black, another re-created breed
