= Pig show =

Event where pigs are evaluated

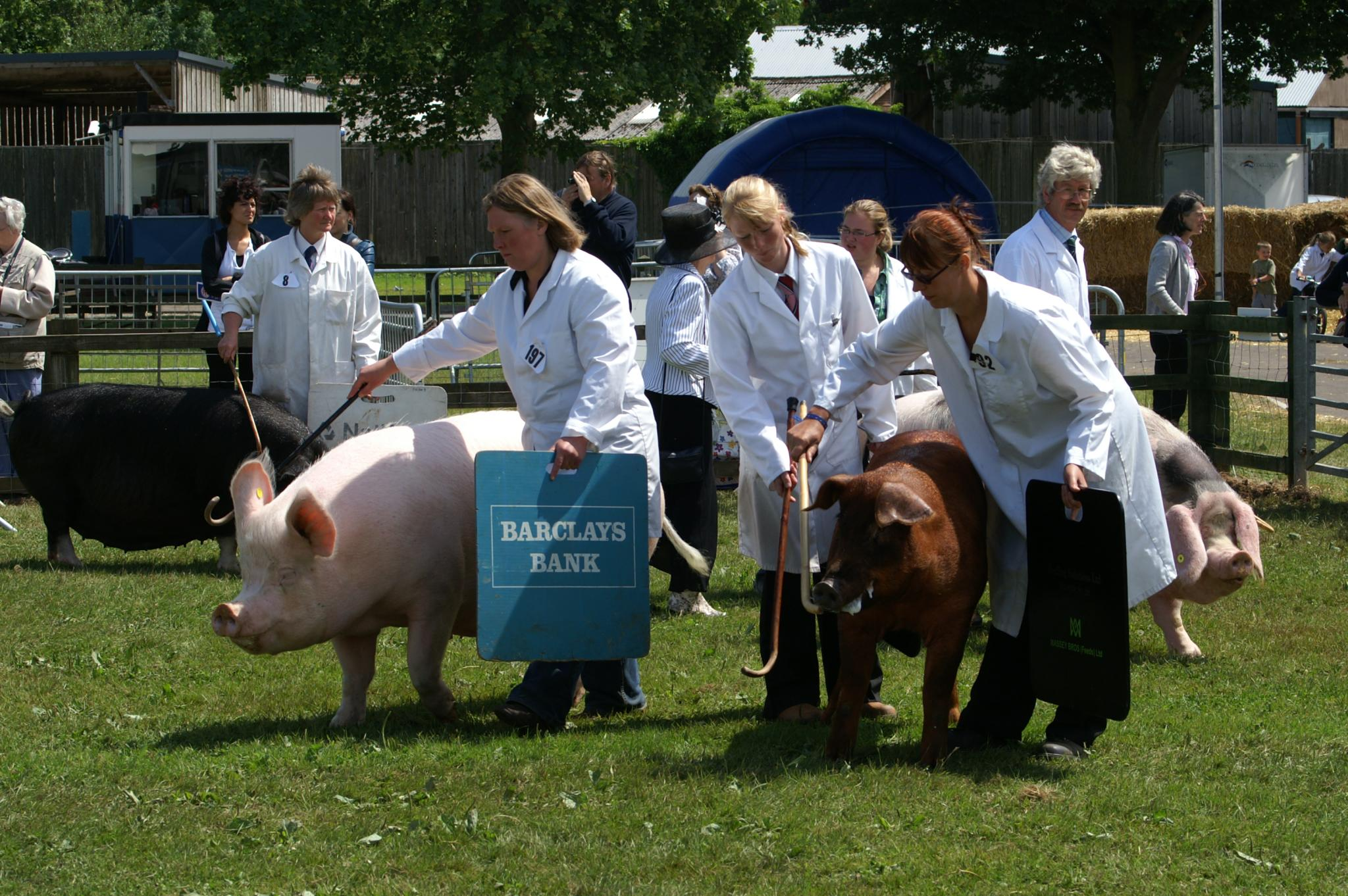
Pig judging in Britain

Pig shows are an event where pigs are evaluated for their quality. They are evaluated on a multitude of things which include composition (muscle vs. fat), capaciousness, and skeletal integrity along with general appearance and conformation to their respective breed. Owners buy or raise their pigs from small piglets and spend time learning what the pig needs to make it the best possible. You can switch up compositions of a pig by simply changing what and how you feed them. Other names for a pig show include swine show and hog show. A pig show is frequently part of a larger agricultural show. During the agricultural show pigs may be shown, as well as cattle, goats, and sheep.

== History ==
Pig shows began on farms where the owner and other pig farmers would gather to decide which pig had the best qualities for breeding. These would not be named pig shows, but ultimately they were making a decision on which animals to retain to breed. Eventually, breeders would meet at a specified location and bring an outside person to evaluate their pigs, and to order them in a ranking. These were the first shows.

A show is typically divided up into classes so that the judge can study fewer pigs at a time. Typically these classes are broken down to the breed of pig, weight, or age. There are division or breed champions and reserve champions. Then ultimately, an overall grand champion will be chosen.

== Swine judging ==
Swine judging is the process of selectively ordering swine or domestic pigs in order to determine the best pig. For market hogs, traits are ranked in order of their importance: Degree of muscling, growth, capacity or volume, degree of leanness, structure and soundness. For breeding gilts, the traits by order of importance are: Structure and soundness, Growth, Underline quality, Capacity or volume, Degree of muscling, Degree of leanness.

A judge will have different priorities and rank importance of certain traits differently than other judges. Judges are selected because they are typically influential breeders within the show pig industry.

== Pig shows by country ==
=== Major pig shows in the United States ===
Name of Pig Show	Location
North American International Livestock Exposition	Louisville, Kentucky
World Pork Expo and Junior Event	Des Moines, Iowa
Summer Type Conference and National Junior Summer Spectacular	Louisville, Kentucky
Southeast Type Conference	Perry, Georgia
Summer Type Conference (CPS)	Springfield, Illinois
Oklahoma Youth Expo	Oklahoma City, Oklahoma
Southwest Type Conference	Belton, Texas
Southwest Hampshire Type Conference	Sweetwater, Texas
National Barrow Show	Austin, Minnesota
San Angelo Stock Show and Rodeo	San Angelo, Texas
San Antonio Stock Show and Rodeo	San Antonio, Texas
Houston Stock Show and Rodeo	Houston, Texas

Show pig breeds in the United States

Berkshire
Chester White
Duroc
Hampshire
Hereford
Landrace
Poland China
Spot
Tamworth
Yorkshire
Cross Bred

=== Pig shows in People's Republic of China ===
In China, the first pig show was the Guangdong Breeding Pigs Auction which began January 18, 1996. Most pig shows in China are pig-breeding auctions. More than 10 provinces have in the past hosted these pig-breeding auctions, but only two provinces (Guangdong Province and Hubei Province) still host it.

Name of Pig Show	Location	Date
Guangdong Pig Industry Expo(Chinese: 广东省养猪产业博览会)	Guangzhou, Guangdong Province	June 16 – June 18 and December 16 – December 18, twice per year
Hubei Breeding Pigs Auction(Chinese: 湖北种猪测定拍卖会)	Wuhan, Hubei Province	October 17 – October 18, once per year

=== Pig show in Australia ===
In Australia, The Sydney Royal Easter Show Competition is held annually. The Sydney Royal Easter Show is one of the largest and most prestigious pig shows in Australia. It is held in Sydney, at the Paddington Pavilion. Pigs were exhibited at the first Sydney Royal Easter Show in 1858 and the pig competition has been held at nearly every show since. Exhibitors that compete at the Sydney Royal Pig Show are often from small family-based Stud farms.

Pig breeds exhibited include: Berkshire, Duroc, Hampshire, American Landrace, Large White pig, Tamworth pig, Wessex Saddleback pig.

== See also ==
- Pig racing
