= Large White Ulster pig =

Breed of pig

Large White Ulster
- Conservation status: Extinct
- Other names: Ulster White
- Country of origin: Ireland
- Use: baconer

Traits
- Skin color: white

The Large White Ulster, or Ulster White, was a breed of domestic pig. Primarily bred for bacon production, it was the favoured breed of farmers in the north of Ireland up until the mid 20th century.

The breed has been extinct since c.1960, with the last boar registered in 1956.

== Origin and characteristics ==
By the end of the 19th century, the breed of pig seen in the northern counties of Ireland was of consistent type and differed from the crosses favoured in the south. A number of potential origins have been suggested for this breed. Up until the 1870s, the Berkshire pig had been the most popular breed in Ireland, but in the latter half of the century 'improvement' efforts were concentrated on white-skinned Yorkshire types, particularly the Middle White, and it is probable that the Ulster White was the result of such crosses with local strains. Some authors asserted that it had some ancestry from the "Old Irish" or "Greyhound Pig" landrace of earlier times. The latter had been a long-legged, coarse-haired pig with white skin, and it has also been suggested that the Ulster White was either the direct product of selective breeding of the Old Irish or of early 19th century crosses between it and the Berkshire.

Whatever its exact origins, the Ulster White bred true to type. It was a medium-large sized pig, long and very deep in the body, with distinctively pendulous ears (like the Old Irish pig) and white, rather thin skin. It was finer-boned and haired, and shorter legged, than the comparable Large White pig of England. It was popular with farmers as it was prolific, docile and easy to look after, with the sows making good mothers.

The breed put on weight quickly and had a tendency to run to fat: it produced very fat bacon which was prized for its rich aroma when cooked. By the early years of the 20th century, the breed's characteristics had been refined and standardised.

== Extinction ==
The Large White Ulster remained by far the most common breed in Northern Ireland until the 1940s, and was also prevalent in Counties Donegal, Cavan and Monaghan. At that time both the UK and Irish governments began to recommend standardisation of pig breeds: the Large White Ulster fell out of favour due to a demand for leaner bacon and particularly due to the fact that the breed's thin skin made it unsuitable for live export. As bruising meant the meat would not be fit for the curing process, it was essentially necessary for slaughter of the Large White Ulster breed to take place on the farm itself. While, for a variety of historical reasons, a practice of farm slaughter was prevalent in Ulster well into the 20th century, the government desired to both encourage export and eliminate waste. In 1934, the Northern Irish government, concerned about lack of growth in the bacon and ham trade, decided not to license boars of the Ulster White breed. A 1947 report of the Agricultural Enquiry Committee for Northern Ireland stated "From the time, however, that the live pig market in the form of the shipping and Wiltshire trades was created it became evident that the Large White Ulster pig would have to be replaced".

The breed was supplanted by the Large White, and became extinct by the early 1960s.
