= Richard Lutwyche =

British author (1949–2021)

Richard Lutwyche (1949 – 2021) was a British author. He organised the first meeting of the Gloucestershire Old Spots Breeders Club.

In 1996, he joined the Rare Breeds Survival Trust as marketing director.

== Books ==
- The Pig: A Natural History (Princeton University Press, 2019)
- Pig Keeping (National Trust, 2010)
- Higgledy-Piggledy (Quillar Press, 2010)
