= Cumberland sausage =

English pork sausage

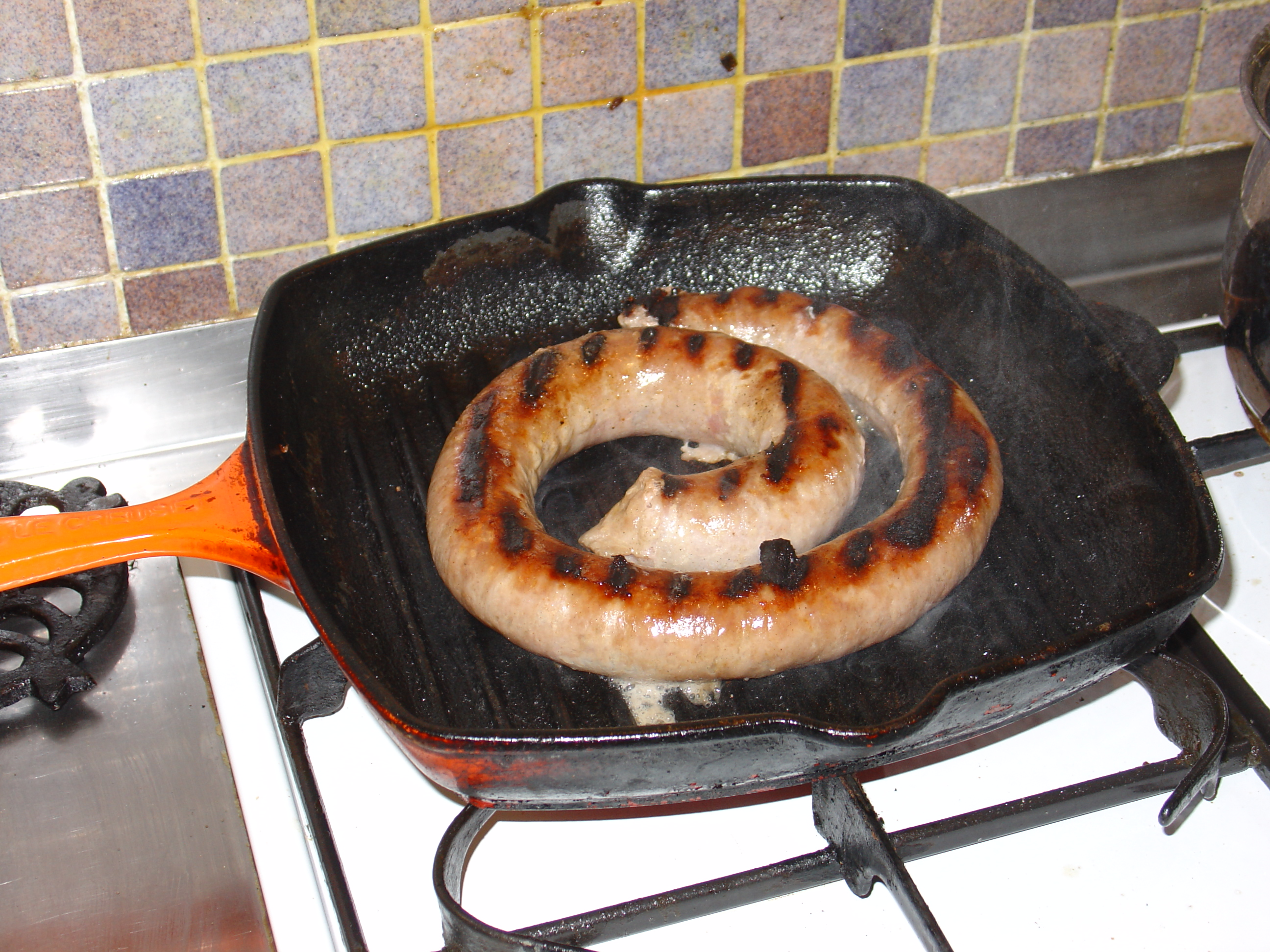
Cumberland sausage

Cumberland sausage is a pork sausage that originated in the historic county of Cumberland, England, ceremonially part of Cumbria. It is traditionally very long, up to 50 centimetres (20 inches), and sold rolled in a flat, circular coil, but within western Cumbria, it is more often served in long, curved lengths.

The meat is chopped, not ground or minced, giving the sausage a chunky texture. Seasonings are prepared from a variety of spices and herbs, though the flavour is commonly dominated by pepper, both black and white, in contrast to more herb-dominated varieties such as Lincolnshire sausage. Traditionally no colourings or preservatives are added.

In March 2011, the European Union granted "Traditional Cumberland sausage" Protected Geographical Indication (PGI) status.

== History ==
The Cumberland sausage has been a local speciality in the area for around 500 years. How the Cumberland sausage came to acquire its special shape and taste is not known. Historically, the sausage was more highly seasoned than it is today, reflecting a strong influx of spices into Whitehaven during the eighteenth century. During this time, Cumbria was introduced to ginger, black pepper, and nutmeg, as well as other foodstuffs such as molasses, sugar, and rum. Many of these ingredients have been incorporated into some of Cumbria's local specialities, such as the spicy Cumberland sausage.

== Ingredients ==
Cumberland sausage is typically filled with chopped or coarsely minced pork, to which is added pepper, thyme, sage, nutmeg and cayenne, and some rusk as a binder. The meat content is usually 85–98%. However, the popularity of the Cumberland sausage has become so widespread in recent years that many large food producers started to mass-produce it and sacrificed its original quality with a meat content as low as 45%, containing emulsified rather than coarse-cut meat and being sold in thin links rather than thick, continuous lengths.

Until the 1950s, most local farms and many households kept a pig as part of their regular husbandry and means of self-sufficiency. Over time, a local variety of pig was bred that was suited to the cooler and wetter climate in Cumberland, known as the Cumberland pig. The Cumberland pig was a heavy pig with an upturned snout and ears that flopped forwards. Heavy boned, slow to mature, and extremely hardy, the creature became a symbol of the region, but was allowed to die out in the early 1960s at Bothel. As an alternative, Large Black, Gloucestershire Old Spots, and Welsh breeds can be used. The Cumberland pig breed has now been revived, although not officially recognised by the Rare Breeds Survival Trust.

== Protected Geographical Status ==
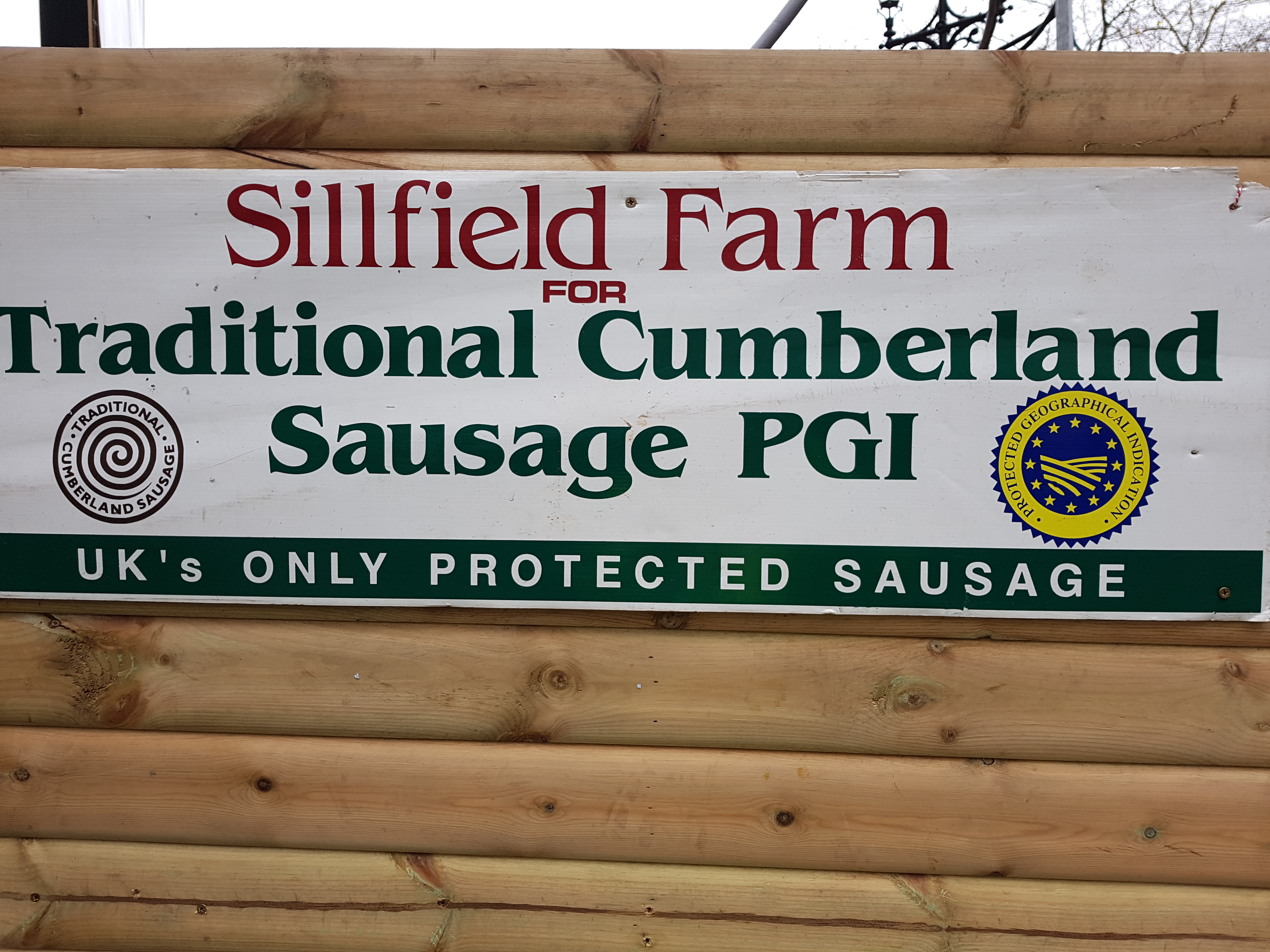

A campaign was made by some Cumbrian butchers and meat manufacturers to have Cumberland sausage placed under a Protected Geographical Status classification under European Commission rules. This would provide the same protection as is afforded to Parma ham and Feta cheese. The association suggested that the criteria for the sausages should include a high meat content of more than 80%; the sausage to be coiled, not linked; a wider diameter than conventional sausages; and a rough-cut texture. The association asserts the sausage should be prepared in Cumbria. While individual butchers have their own recipes, they are generally more highly seasoned than traditional sausages, possibly due to the historical import of spices at Whitehaven.

However, opposition arose to the campaign in its present form, which essentially calls for the modification of the proposition to reduce the region of the proposed protection from the post-1974 'administrative' County of Cumbria – which incorporates Cumberland, Westmorland, and Lancashire 'north of the Sands' but without abolishing the original counties – to the Traditional County of Cumberland, on native grounds, with provisions including the native right for natives to continue to manufacture the sausage elsewhere.

In March 2011, PGI status was granted to the name "Traditional Cumberland sausage". To display the PGI mark, the sausage must be produced, processed, and prepared exclusively in Cumbria and have a meat content of at least 80%. It must include seasoning and be sold in a long coil. However, sausages not meeting these criteria are sold as Cumberland sausages (without claiming PGI).
