= Small white =

Small white may refer to

- Dixeia, a genus of butterflies commonly known as the small whites
- Pieris rapae, a butterfly commonly known as the cabbage, cabbage white, or small white
- Small White pig, an extinct breed of domestic pig
