= Dorset Gold Tip =

British breed of pig

- Conservation status: extinct
- Country of origin: England

Traits

The Dorset Gold Tip was a British breed of pig. It is now considered extinct.

== History ==
The Dorset Gold Tip was originally developed during the nineteenth century. It originated with a Tamworth cross, likely with the Berkshire and possibly with some additional Gloucester Old Spot ancestry.

It was bred for quick growth, early maturing, and extreme size at a time when fat bacon was more desirable than it is today; some specimens were so large they were unable to move out of their pens.

It was always a relatively rare breed, with few licensed boars appearing on records, although it was regularly exhibited during the 1920s and 1930s. By 1955, only one boar was still registered, although the Dorset Gold Tip Pig Society was still in existence in 1961. The breed may have become extinct in the 1960s or 1970s.

== Characteristics ==
The breed had slightly folded (lop) ears, and a coat with a reddish base colour, like the Tamworth, and black spots: the hairs had gold tips, giving the breed its name.
