= Yorkshire Blue and White =

Breed of pig

- Conservation status: Extinct
- Other names: Bilsdale Blue
- Country of origin: United Kingdom

Traits

The Yorkshire Blue and White pig, also known as the Bilsdale Blue, or as the "Blood Breed", was a breed of domestic pig originating in the United Kingdom. It is now considered extinct.

== Characteristics and history ==
The Blue and White was a small breed of pig originating in the North Riding of Yorkshire, where it had some relationship to the Large White pig which was developed in the same county. As its name suggested it had retained prominent blue spots on the skin that had been progressively bred out of other white pigs. Until the mid 20th century, the Blue and White remained popular with small farmers due to its hardy characteristics and the fact that the sows made excellent mothers. However, it was little known outside the North Riding and was nationally rare.

By 1954 there were only three boars licensed, and by 1963 only one. The breed appears to have become extinct before the 1973 establishment of the Rare Breeds Survival Trust.

A Bilsdale Blue sow is one of the animals shown in the classic 1952 British Transport Films documentary Farmer Moving South, showing a farmer transporting his stock from Stokesley station.
