= Institute of Certificated Grocers =

The Institute of Certificated Grocers was incorporated on 11 November 1909 and its first registered offices were at 24 Bedford Sq, London.

It brought together a number of "public-spirited employers and others interested in the grocery trade" who had "begun to start technical instruction committees and local classes for the furtherance of the teaching of those who were going to take part in the trade." Sir William Anson MP, was the organisation's first president.

Russell Parnham Spink, Chairman of the Council of the Institute was awarded a C.B.E. in the 1963 New Year Honours.

It published books including an account of a Tour to Denmark, in May 1949 and a book about Bacon and Hams by George J. Nicholls in 1917. Nicholls was a Trustee, Member of Council, Chairman of Finance Committee, and honorary Examiner to the Institute of Certificated Grocers.

Its archives for 1932–1934 are held in the National Archives in Kew.
