= Lincolnshire sausage =

English sage-flavoured pork sausage

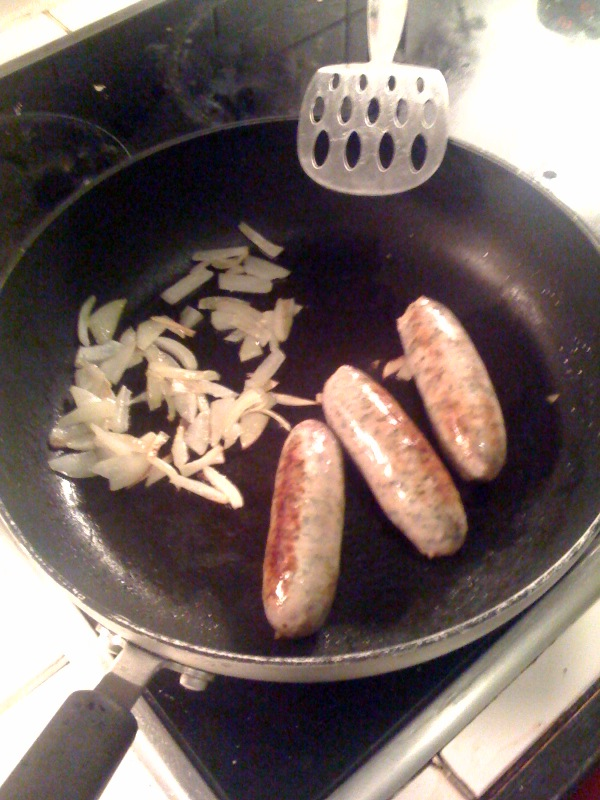
- Course: Main
- Place of origin: England
- Region or state: Lincolnshire
- Serving temperature: Hot, or cold in sausage rolls
- Main ingredients: Pork, sage
- Variations: Chipolata

Lincolnshire sausages are a distinctive variety of pork sausage developed in and associated with the English county of Lincolnshire.

A widely available variety at most UK butchers and supermarkets, the sausage is commonly dominated by the herb sage, rather than the more peppery flavour balance found in other regional English sausages such as the Cumberland sausage. Other herbs such as parsley and thyme are often used, although these are not considered authentic Lincolnshire sausages. Lincolnshire sausages are also characterised by their open, chunky texture, the result of the constituent pork being coarsely chopped or ground rather than minced.

== History and origin ==
The earliest recorded reference to a recipe for a "Lincolnshire sausage" dates from May 1886, although Grimsby butcher John Petit claims to have a family recipe dating back to 1810.

== Ingredients and manufacture ==
Lincolnshire sausages are made with coarsely chopped or ground pork mixed with binders, seasonings and preservative. Traditionally, the dominant seasoning flavour has always been the herb sage, but some recipes include other herbs, such as parsley or thyme, and flavourings such as onion.

== European protected status application ==
In 2004, a group of 13 Lincolnshire butchers, led by the large sausage-producing firm of George Adams & Sons, began moves to protect the name of the Lincolnshire sausage, applying for Protected Geographical Indication (PGI) status under European Union law. In support of the PGI application, the Lincolnshire Sausage Association was formed in early 2006. Under these proposals, to qualify as a 'Lincolnshire' sausage, not only would a sausage have to be manufactured in the county, but it would also have to conform to a standard ingredient list:

- British pork, coarse cut, minimum meat content 70%
- Maximum fat content 25%
- Breadcrumbs/bread rusk
- Sage, salt and pepper
- Natural pork casings (or sheep casings, for chipolata-style sausages)
- Sulphite preservative (to 450 ppm maximum)

In 2010, a group of Lincolnshire butchers introduced a voluntary 5 pence 'tax' in support of the PGI application, and to fund the fight against Lincolnshire sausages being manufactured elsewhere or making too much use of seasonings other than sage.

However, objections to the PGI application were raised by other producers of the sausage, who claimed that more than 95% of existing commercial sausage production would be excluded under its terms. The PGI application was rejected by the UK Department for Environment, Food and Rural Affairs (DEFRA) in 2012, which cited a lack of strong ties to the county.

== Variations ==
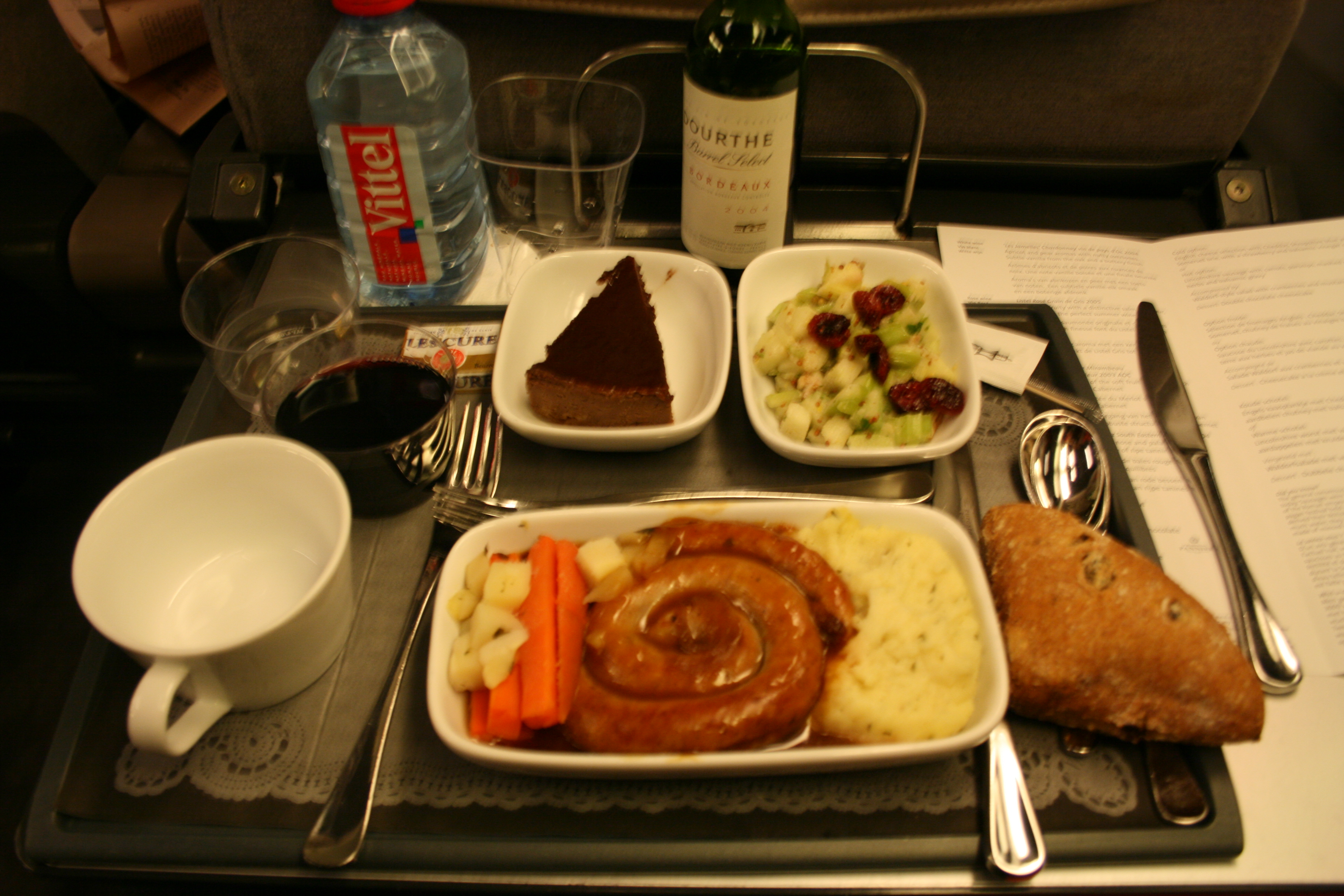
A Lincolnshire sausage, manufactured in the unlinked style more commonly associated with the Cumberland sausage

Unlike the Cumberland sausage, there is no standard width or length for a Lincolnshire sausage, although there are conventionally eight sausages to a pound weight. Commonly, the variety is associated with a broader style, but Lincolnshire chipolata sausages are also widely available. Some producers within Lincolnshire brand their products with a more specific local name, such as Mountain's Boston Sausage, named for their home in Boston, Lincolnshire, despite their recipe conforming to normal Lincolnshire sausage standards. Lincolnshire sausage closely resembles American breakfast sausage.

Some manufacturers produce meat-free sausages that use sage as the dominant flavouring and these are commonly sold as vegetarian Lincolnshire sausages.

== Competitions ==
Every year, a competition is held in Lincoln to find the best Lincolnshire sausage.

== See also ==
- Cumberland sausage
- Melton Mowbray pork pie
