= Wessex Saddleback =

Breed of pig

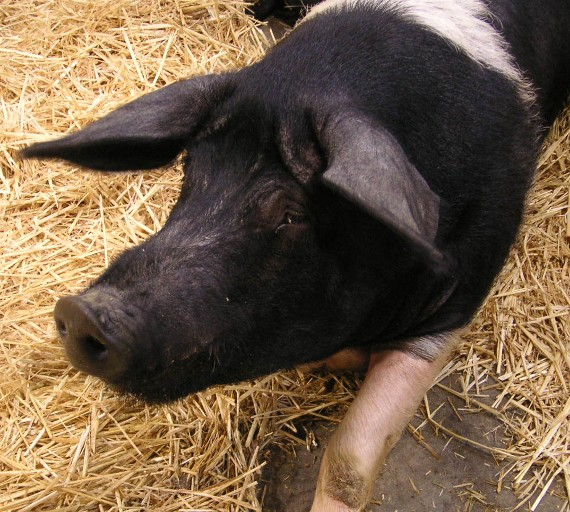
- A Wessex Saddleback at the Sydney Royal Easter Show.
- Country of origin: England

Traits

The Wessex Saddleback or Wessex Pig is a breed of domestic pig originating in the West Country of England (Wessex), especially in Wiltshire and the New Forest area of Hampshire. It is black, with white forequarters. In Britain it was amalgamated with the Essex pig to form the British Saddleback, and it is extinct as a separate breed in Britain. However, the Wessex Saddleback survives in Australia and New Zealand.

== Description ==
The Wessex Saddleback is black, with a white band about the forepart of the trunk, extending from one fore-foot over the shoulder to the other, forming a white band resembling a saddle (or "sheet"). It is a tall, rangy animal, adapted to foraging in woodland, its traditional use. This use survived longest in the New Forest, where pigs are still allowed to forage in woods for mast (acorns, beech-nuts and chestnuts) – but the New Forest pigs no longer include pure-bred Wessex Saddlebacks.

== History ==
There is uncertainty about the origin of the Wessex Saddleback. Some sources state that it began as a cross of "the black breed of the New Forest" and "the Old English Sheeted breed", spreading through Hampshire and the Isle of Purbeck in the 18th century. However others simply say that the breed is "of unknown origin". The breed has been claimed to be one of the few British pig breeds to have been little affected by crossing with "Neapolitan" pigs of Far Eastern origin, and if this is true, it is perhaps one of those closest to the landrace pigs which foraged in woods throughout Britain for many centuries.

The Wessex Saddleback breed society began in 1918 in Britain, but by the middle of the 20th century pig farming was becoming more and more intensive. The more extensive systems to which the Wessex is suited declined, and the breed declined with them. Meanwhile, the similarly coloured (but otherwise rather different) Essex had followed a similar course, and in 1967 the two breeds were merged in an effort to prevent both becoming extinct. This formed a hybrid breed, the British Saddleback, though the name "Wessex Saddleback" is often used loosely in Britain for the British Saddleback. A few herds of Essex Pigs survived in a relatively pure form in Britain, and efforts are being made to revive them as a separate breed, but the Wessex is currently considered extinct in its country of origin.

However, before amalgamation some Wessex Saddlebacks had been exported to other parts of the world, and the breed survives in small numbers in Australia, New Zealand, and perhaps elsewhere. In Australia in 2008 there are less than 100 registered breeding sows, and they are considered critically endangered by the Rare Breeds Trust of Australia.

In the early 19th Century, similar pigs from Hampshire were exported to North America, and formed the basis of the Hampshire pig, one of the commonest commercial breeds there. The Hampshire has since been re-imported to Britain, but it is now of a different type to the Wessex.

== Uses ==
Regarded as an excellent eating pig, the Wessex Saddleback was traditionally used as a "baconer" and grown out for bacon and hams.

== Gallery ==
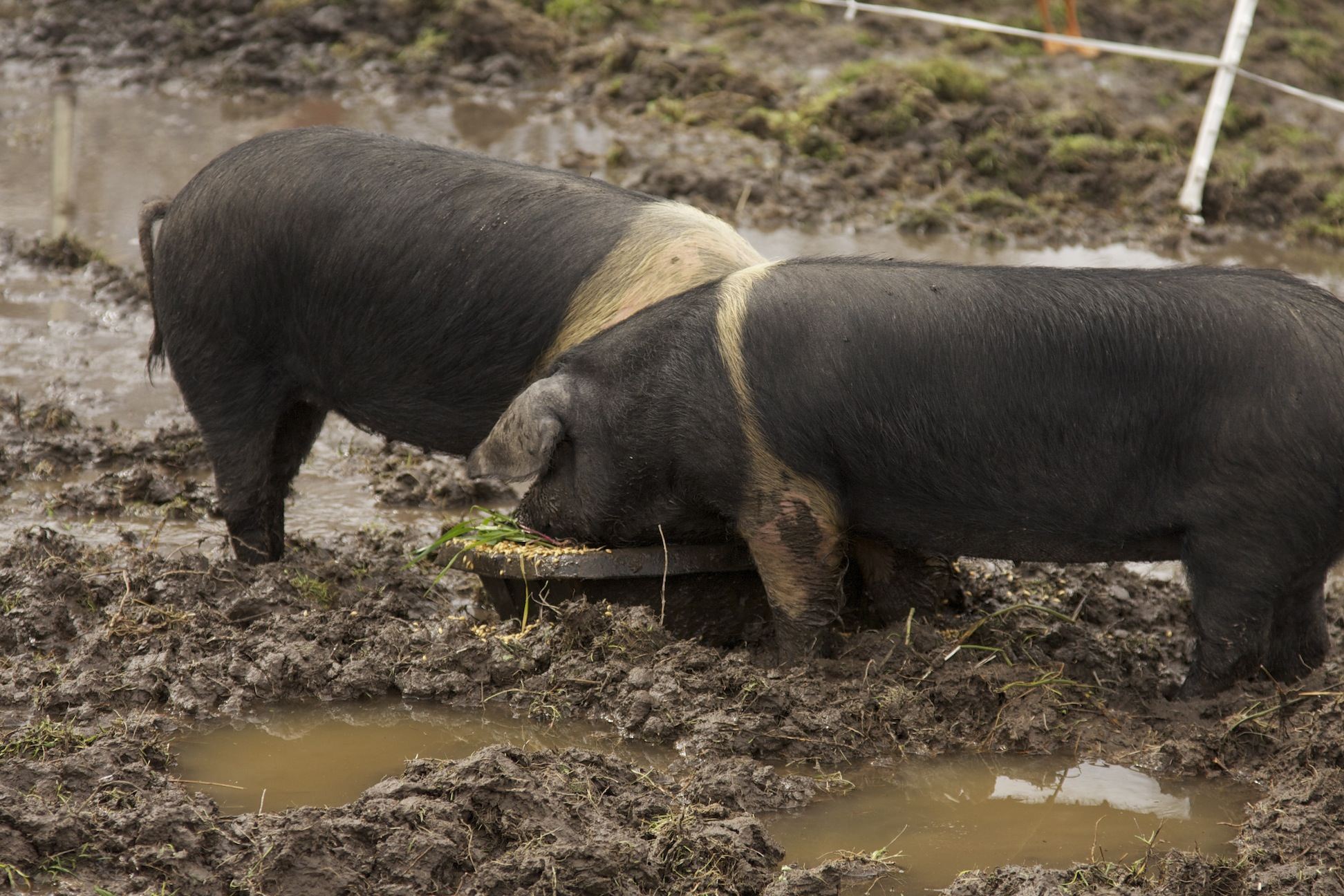

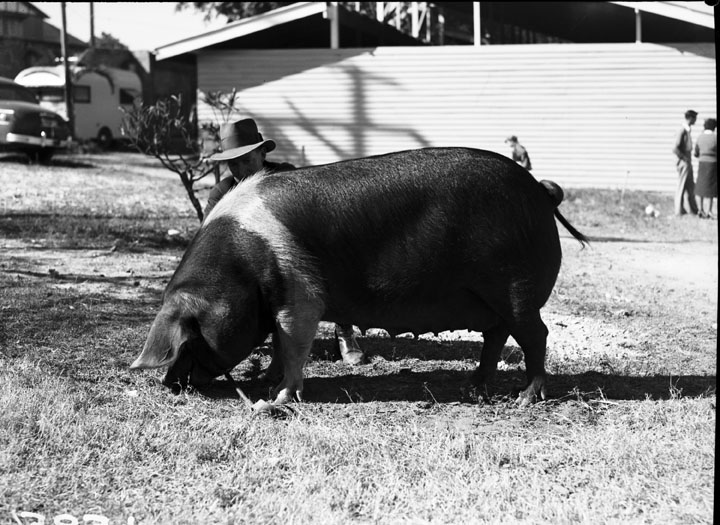

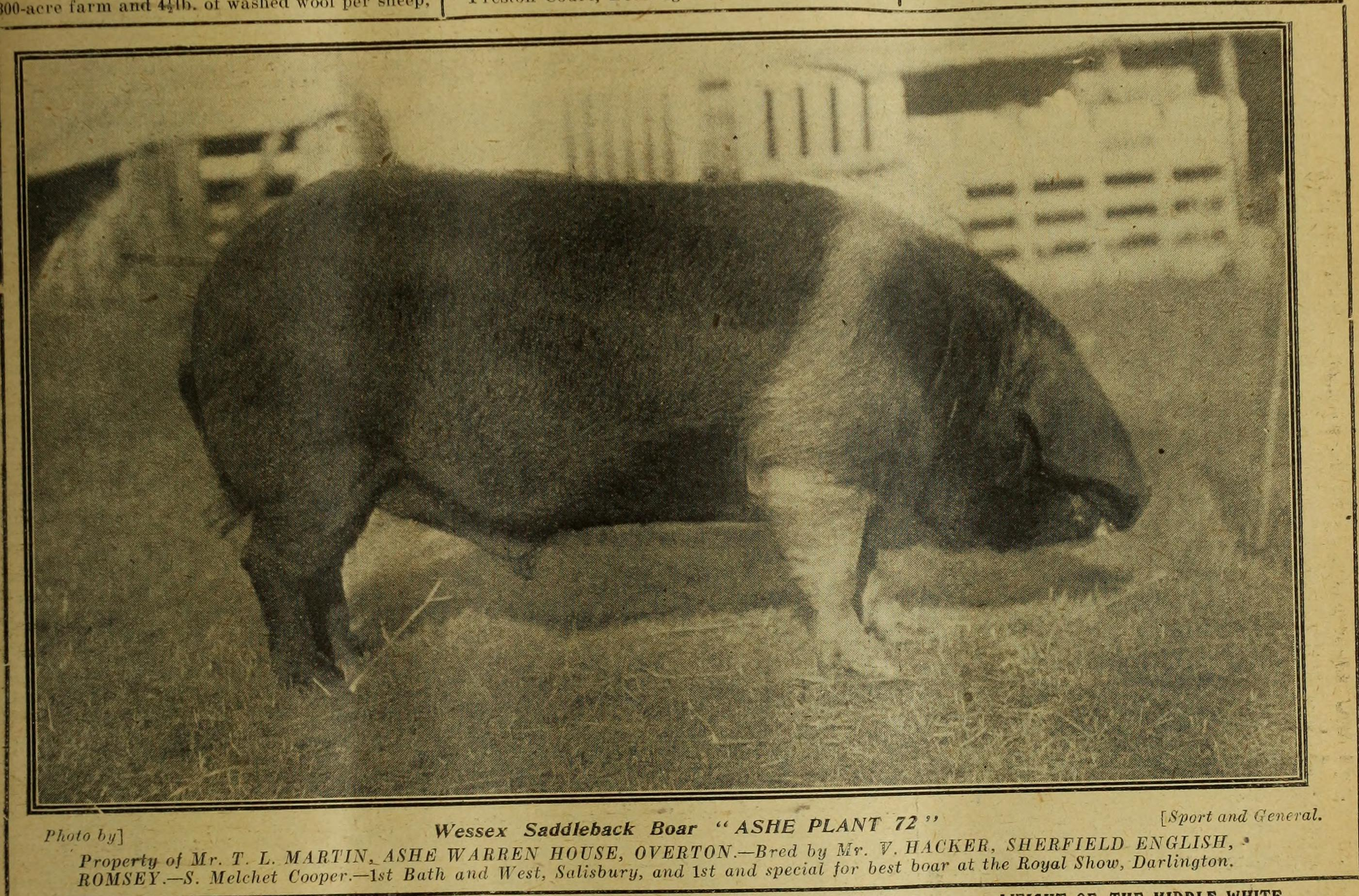
