= Harold Howitt =

English accountant

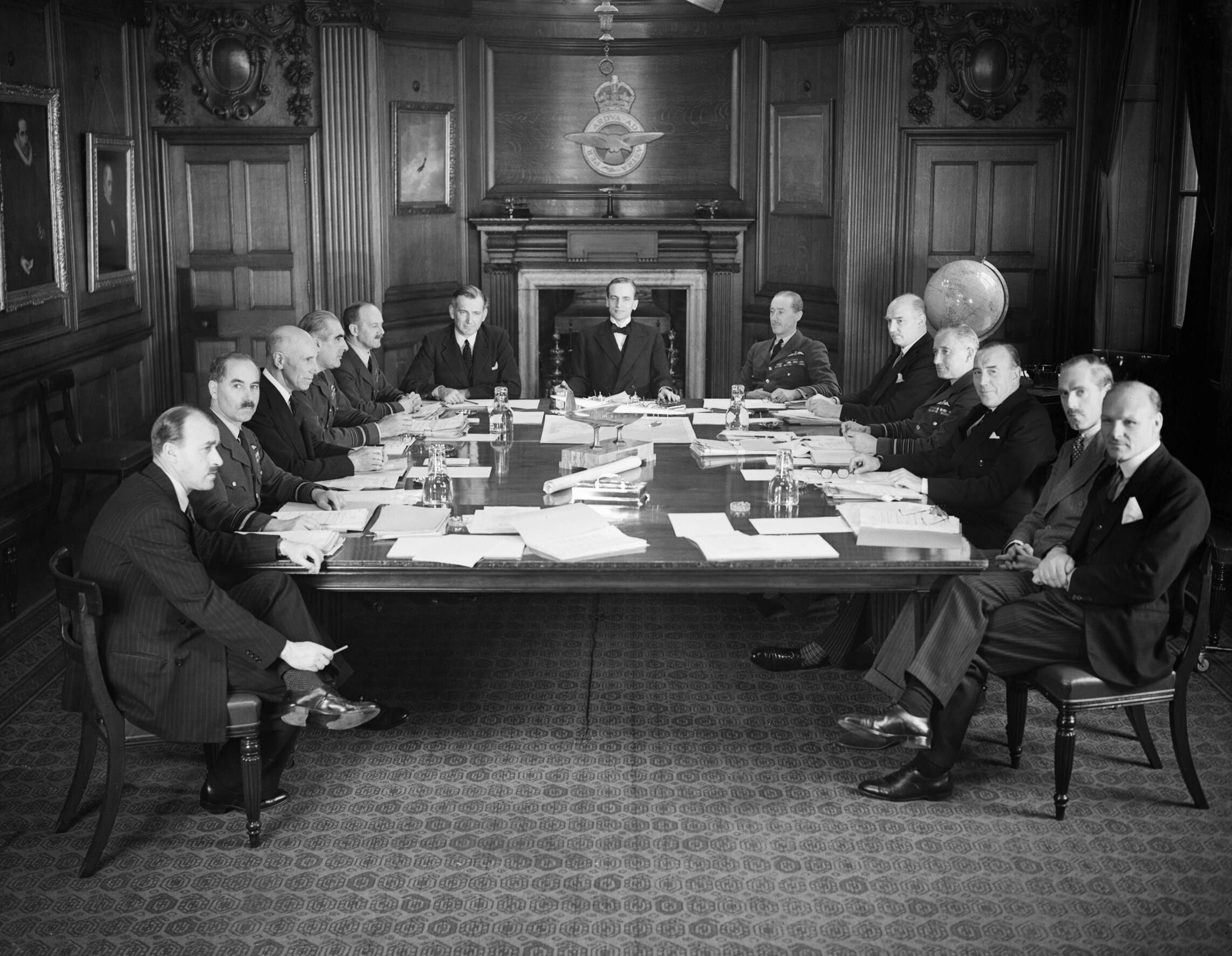
Howitt (second from left) during an Air Council session, 1940

Sir Harold Gibson Howitt (5 October 1886 – 30 November 1969) was an English accountant who had a distinguished military career during the First World War and who undertook a long series of important public service commissions. Notable among these was his report on the reorganisation of the British pig industry.

Howitt was born in Nottingham, the son of Arthur Gibson Howitt. He was educated at Uppingham School.

== Selected publications ==
- Development of pig production in the United Kingdom: report of the Advisory Committee on Development of Pig Production in the United Kingdom, HMSO, 1955

The main conclusions of the "Howitt Report" were that UK pig farmers should focus on three main breeds: the Welsh pig, British Landrace and the Large White pig in order to compete with European pig farmers.
