= Middle White =

British breed of pig

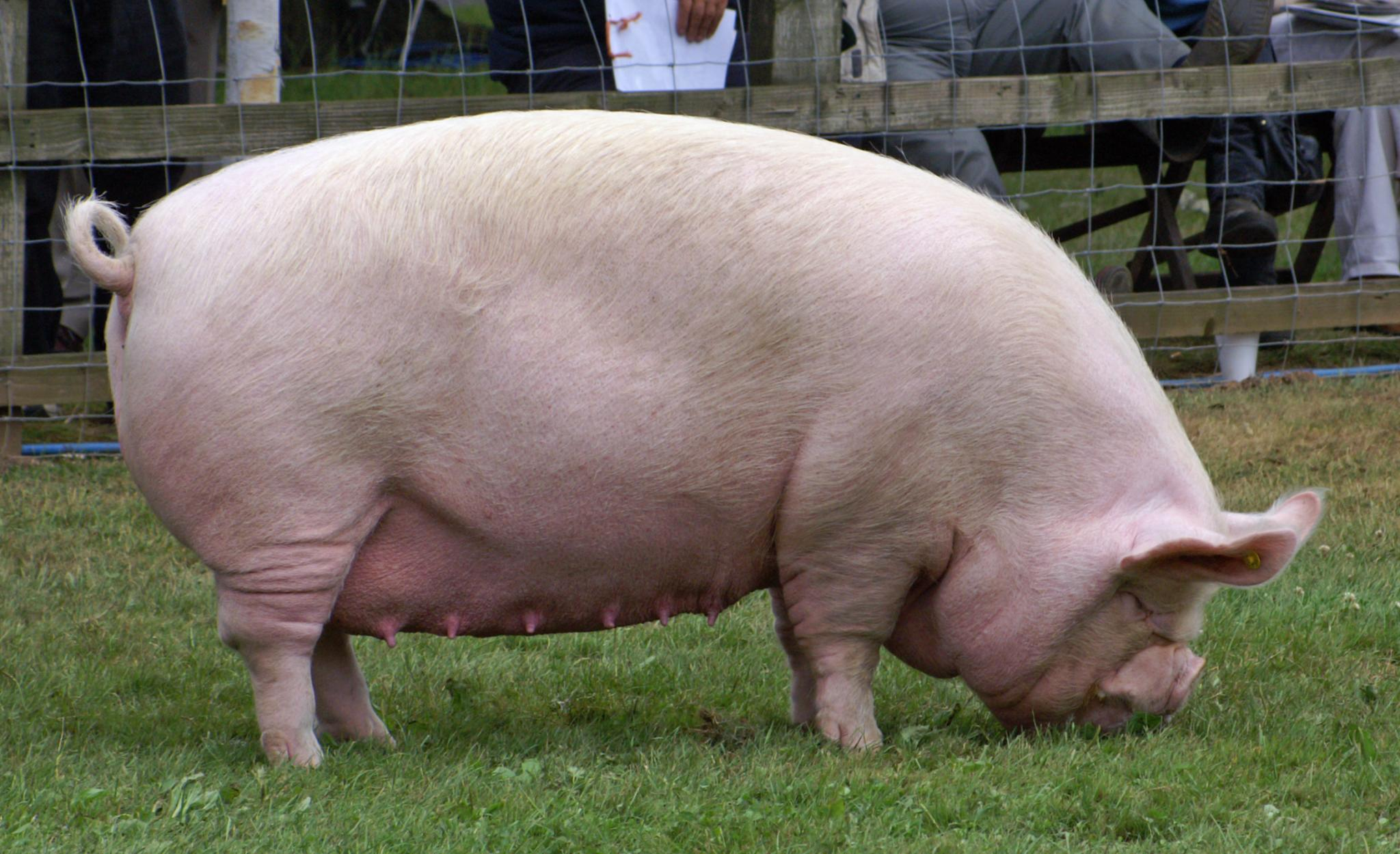
- Sow at the last Royal Show at Stoneleigh Park in 2009
- Conservation status: FAO (2007): endangered; RBST (2010): endangered; RBST (2021): priority; DAD-IS (2021): at risk
- Other names: Middle Breed; Middle Yorkshire; Middle Yorks (Japan)
- Country of origin: United Kingdom
- Distribution: international
- Use: pork

Traits
- Weight: Male: average 275 kg; Female: average 225 kg
- Height: Male: average 90 cm; Female: average 80 cm

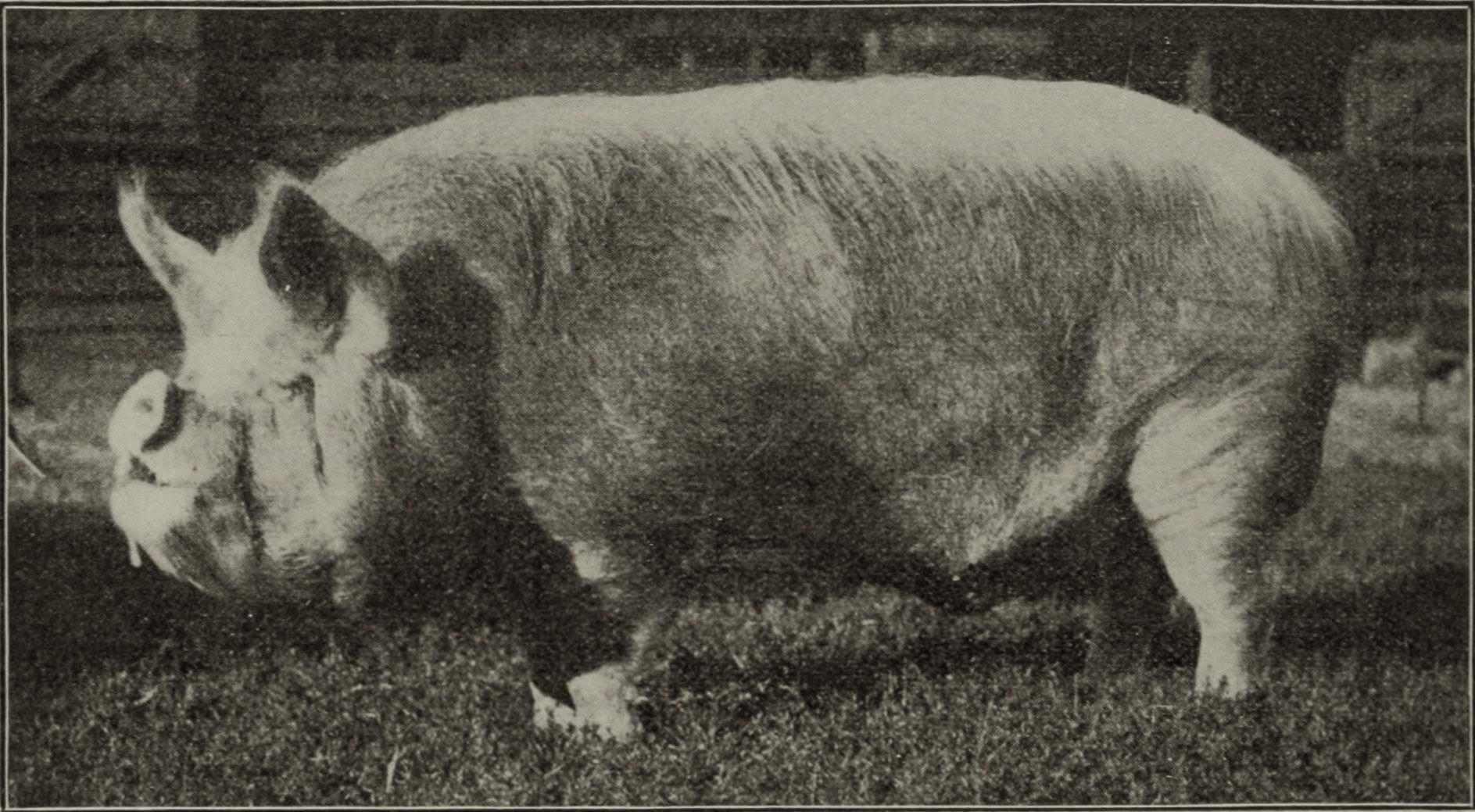
Holywell Rosador, a Middle White boar, took first prize at the Royal Counties Show and at the Highland and Agricultural Society of Scotland Show, 1899

The Middle White is a British breed of domestic pig. It originated in Yorkshire, and derived from the Large White and the now-extinct Small White. It was recognised in 1852, and the first herd-book was published in 1884. It is a porker – reared for fresh pork rather than for bacon or for lard like some other breeds of pig – and is characterised by a short and sharply-upturned snout. After the Second World War it came close to extinction; although numbers have recovered somewhat, it is listed by the Rare Breeds Survival Trust as "priority" – the highest level of risk of the trust.

== History ==
In the early eighteenth century the traditional Yorkshire pigs of the county of that name were to a greater or lesser extent cross-bred with other stock, mostly of Asian origin; the effects of this were seen mainly in the shape of the face and in the size of the resulting animals. By about 1850 the Small White – a small white pig with a heavily foreshortened snout – was popular as a show breed; the Large White showed much less Oriental influence. In 1852, at an agricultural show in Keighley in the West Riding of Yorkshire, a breeder named Joseph Tuley presented pigs bred by crossing Large White sows with Small White boars. The judges ruled that they could be shown as neither breed, but – since the pigs were of good quality – created a new "Middle Breed" class in which he might show them.

In 1884 the National Pig Association was established to manage three breeds: the Large White, the Tamworth and the Middle White, for which the first herd-book was published in that year. In the late nineteenth and early twentieth centuries the Middle White was among the most successful pig breeds in Britain. It was used to supply the relatively small joints of pork which were then in demand, particularly in London; it was sometimes called the "London porker". It was exported to a number of European countries, to Australia and South Africa, and to parts of Asia including China, India, Malaysia and particularly Japan, where – under the name "Middle Yorks" – it was the preferred pig breed until the later twentieth century, when it was progressively displaced by the Japanese Berkshire.

From 1933 the politics of pig-breeding in Britain favoured baconers over porkers; this was particularly the case under the food rationing during and after the Second World War. In 1955 the Howitt report on the development of pig production in the United Kingdom was published. Its main conclusions were that UK pig farms were poorly placed to compete with European producers, that the diversity of local breeds in the UK was an obstacle to progress, and that British pig farmers should focus on three breeds only: the Welsh, the British Landrace, and the Large White. The report initiated a period of decline in all other British pig breeds, including the Middle White. By the time the Rare Breeds Survival Trust was founded in 1973, numbers of all traditional pig breeds were dangerously low, and many of them were extinct. In 1986 the Middle White breed population was reported to be 15. In 1990 a breed association, the Middle White Pig Breeders' Club, was established.

In 2010 the breed was listed on the watchlist of the Rare Breeds Survival Trust as "category 2, endangered". In 2021 it was listed as "priority", the highest level of risk; it is one of six pig breeds in that category. In 2019 a total breed population of 321 was reported to DAD-IS.

== Characteristics ==
The Middle White is of medium size: on average, boars stand about 90 cm at the withers and weigh some 275 kg; sows are about 10 cm less tall, and weigh about 50 kg less. The skin is thin and unpigmented, the hair is white and fine. The face is dished, the snout is foreshortened and upturned, and the ears are large, upright and pointed.

It is suited to extensive management; it grazes well, but because of its short snout does not dig as much as some other breeds.

The average litter size is 8.5 or 9 piglets.

== Use ==
The Middle White was traditionally reared for its pork. It matures early and is usually slaughtered at three or four months old, at a weight of some 65–70 kg; if taken beyond this weight it is more likely to put on fat than lean meat. The bones and offal are fairly light, and the carcass yield or killing-out percentage is high; in one exceptional case it was recorded at over 90%. Alternatively, pigs may be slaughtered at a weight of 10–14 kg to be marketed as suckling pig.

Middle White herds may also be used in vegetation management.
