= Irish Greyhound Pig =

Breed of pig

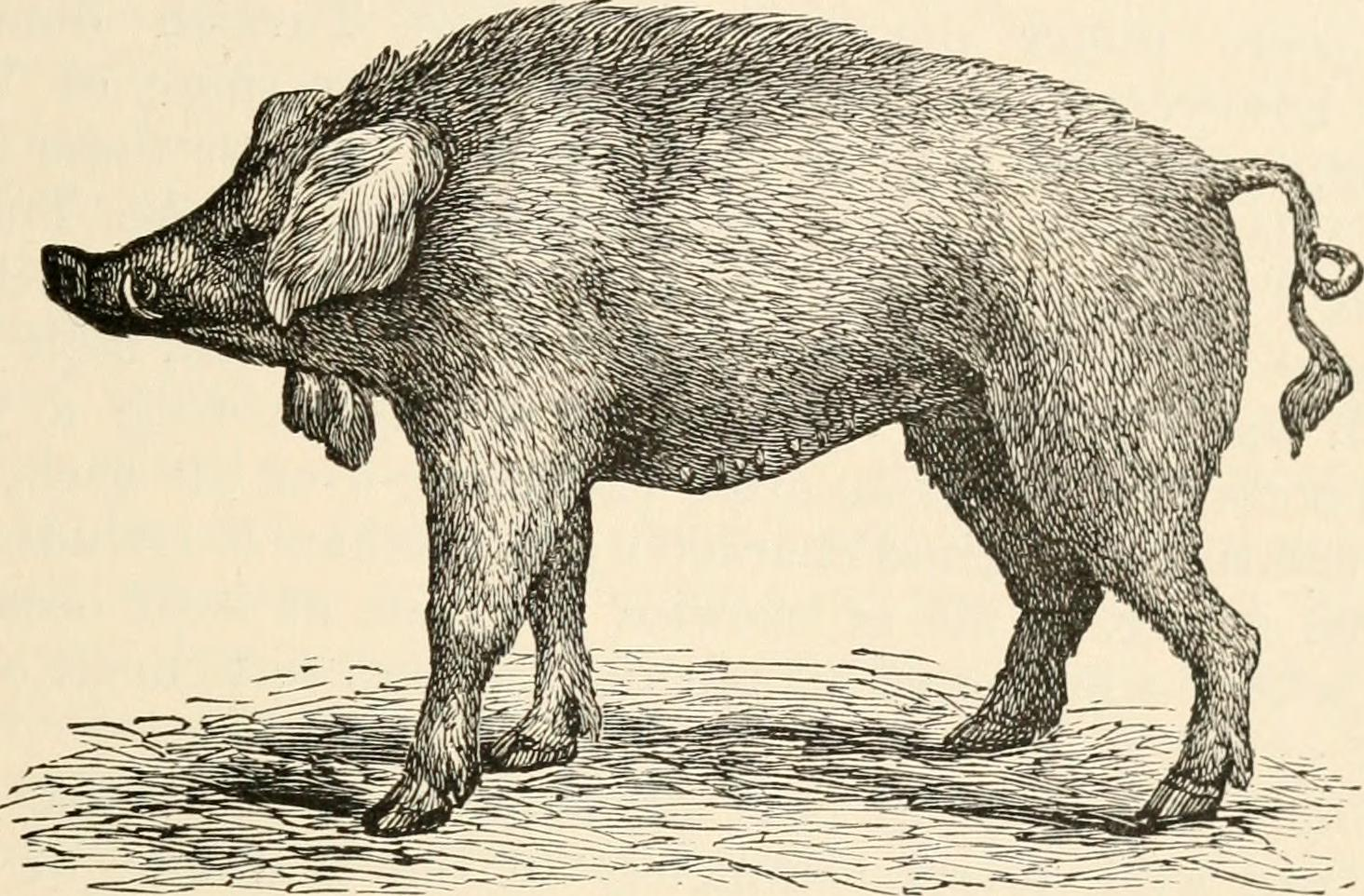
Irish Greyhound pig

The Irish Greyhound pig, was the common pig in Ireland up to the 18th and 19th centuries and it survived in domestication until the start of the 20th. It was reported by Watson (1999) to have been described as "a very rough race of animals – colour white, standing very high on the legs, with narrow carcasses, thick coarse bone, rough bristles, long noses and hanging ears". He also reports them as having been described as being rather slow to mature. The negative tone in descriptions of the pigs, it has been suggested, might be due to the difficulties faced by poor farmers having sufficient food for their pigs. Savage (1964) suggests the origins of these pigs is likely to have been directly from the wild boar rather than from the stock of other British domestic pigs. Savage (1964, citing Scharff) reports the last surviving Greyhound pigs being recorded in County Galway from about 1900 and that remains were held in the National Museum of Ireland, Dublin.

== See also ==
- Grice
