= Gloucestershire Old Spots =

Breed of pig

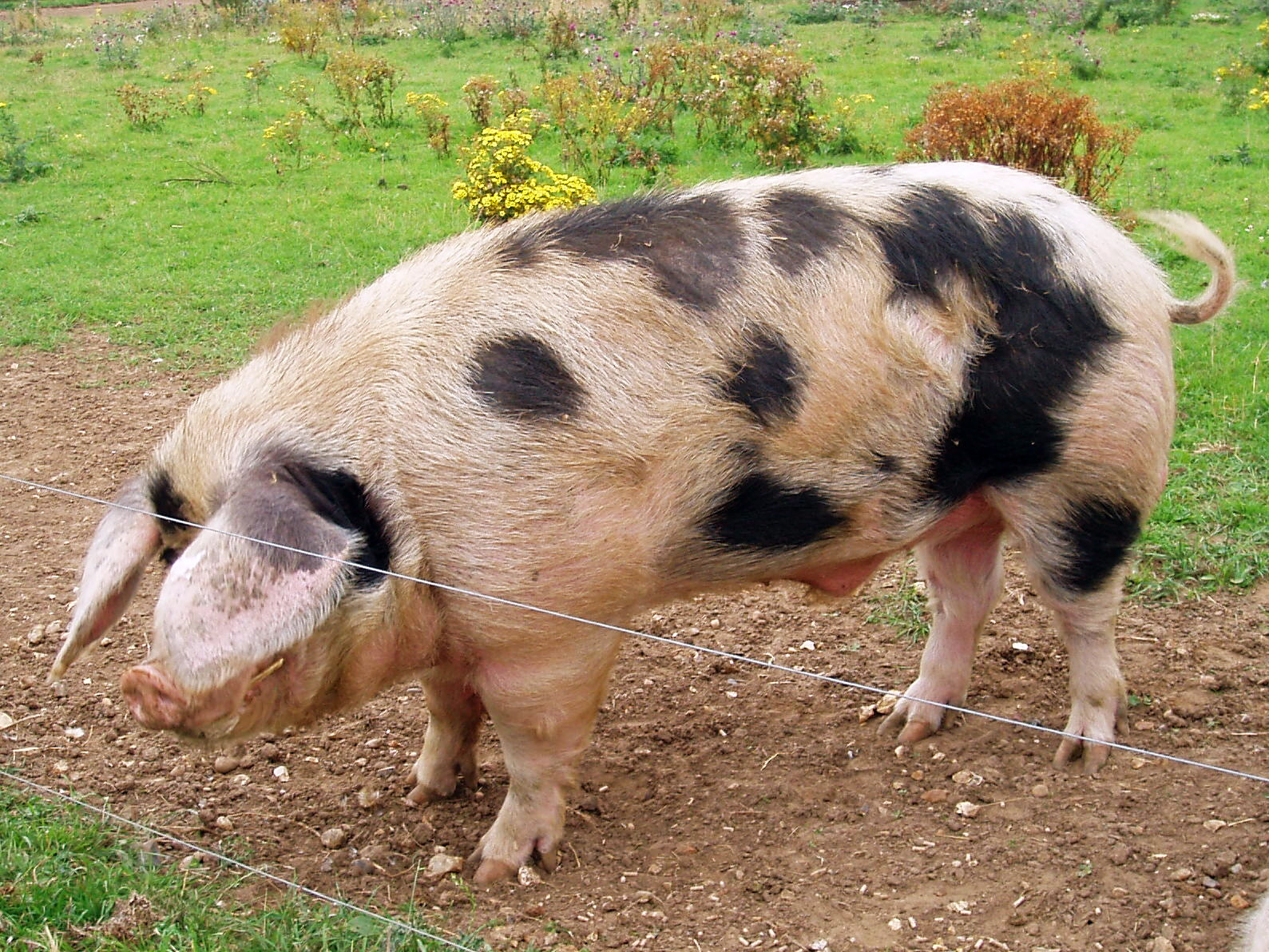
- A Gloucestershire Old Spots boar
- Conservation status: Rare breed
- Other names: Gloucester; Gloucester Old Spot; Gloucestershire Old Spot; Old Spots
- Country of origin: England

Traits

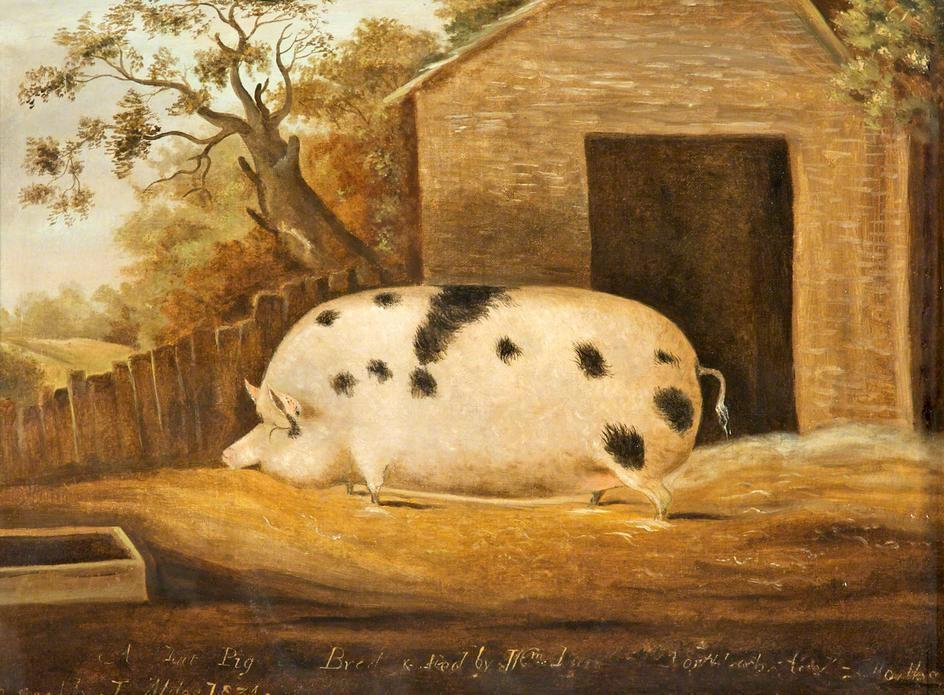
An 1834 painting of a Gloucestershire Old Spot in the Gloucester City Museum & Art Gallery collection. Said to be the largest pig ever bred in Britain.

The Gloucestershire Old Spots (also Gloucester, Gloucester Old Spot, Gloucestershire Old Spot or simply Old Spots) is an English breed of pig which is predominantly white with black spots. It is named after the county of Gloucestershire. The Gloucestershire Old Spots pig is known for its docility, intelligence, prolificity, and hardiness. Boars reach a mature weight of 600 lb (272 kg) and sows 500 lb (227 kg). The pigs are white with clearly defined black (not blue) spots. There must be at least one spot on the body to be accepted in the registry. The breed's maternal skills enable it to raise large litters of piglets on pasture. Its disposition and self‑sufficiency should make it attractive for farmers raising pasture pigs and those who want to add pigs to diversified operations.

== History ==
The Gloucestershire Old Spots (GOS) Breed Society was formed in 1913. The originators of that society called the breed 'Old' Spots because the pig had been known for as long as anyone could remember. The first pedigree records of pigs began in 1885, much later than it did for cattle, sheep and horses because the pig was a peasant's animal, a scavenger and was never highly regarded. No other pedigree spotted breed was recorded before 1913, so today's GOS is recognised as the oldest such breed in the world. From the British Pig Association: "Although if old paintings are to be trusted, there have been spotted pigs around for two or three centuries, the Gloucestershire Old Spots has only had pedigree status since the early 20th century."

=== Origins and development ===
Besides its correct title and variations such as Gloster Spot or just Old Spot, the breed is also known as the "Orchard Pig" and "The Cottager's Pig". Despite these humble origins, both The Prince of Wales and The Princess Royal keep GOS pigs on their respective Gloucestershire estates.

One other notable contributor is the Lincolnshire Curly Coat, a pig that has since gone extinct. The Old Spots is also genetically and characteristically similar to the extinct Cumberland pig and is being used in its attempted recreation in the UK. These breeds were regarded as thrifty and excellent foragers, supplementing their feed with roots and vegetation. Additionally, the GOS gene pool has contributed to the American Spot and the Chester White. Additional commonalities among these breeds include excellent maternal instincts and even temperament, as Old Spots tend to be very calm, good-natured animals, another trait that makes them desirable to homesteaders and small farmers. The females tend to be very devoted mothers, while the males seldom pose a threat to piglets.

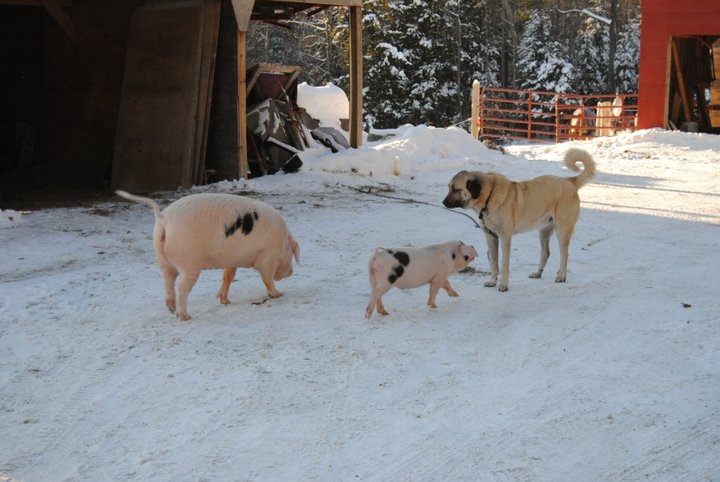
A GOS sow and a GOS piglet meet a Kangal dog.

The Old Spots was once a very popular breed of pig. With the advent of intensive farming, certain lean, pale, high-yield breeds were chosen to suit the factory conditions and needs of mass-production. Many old breeds of pig died out, or were greatly diminished, in this time. However, owing to consumer pressure in the United Kingdom, and changes to the law, both attributable to an increasing awareness of, and concern about, farming conditions, pigs have been increasingly reared outdoors there. In addition, more consumers are looking for quality meat, as opposed to cheap, bland meat product. In these conditions, old breeds well-suited to living outdoors, such as the Old Spots, have increasingly been chosen by farmers looking to add value to their products.

== Endangered breed ==
The GOS pig is on the "Critical" List by The Livestock Conservancy, meaning there are fewer than 200 annual registrations in the United States and estimated fewer than 2000 global population. In the UK the Old Spots is listed as "At Risk" by the Rare Breeds Survival Trust as there are fewer than 1000 registered breeding females.

== Traditional Speciality Guaranteed ==
An application has been made to gain European Commission Traditional Speciality Guaranteed (TSG) status for Old Spots pig meat under the name "Traditionally farmed Gloucestershire Old Spots pork". This was granted on 29 July 2010, and the designation applies in both the EU and the UK. The TSG certification attests that a particular food product objectively possesses specific characteristics which differentiate it from all others in its category, and that its raw materials, composition or method of production have been consistent for a minimum of 30 years.

== Breed characteristics ==
The GOS is a large breed, white in colour with a minimum of one distinct black spot. It has lop ears which will almost cover the face of a mature pig and hang towards the nose.

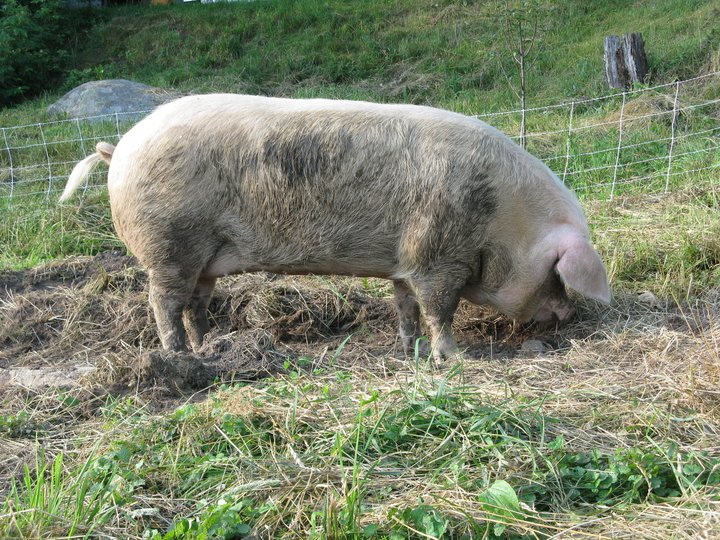
A good example of an adult GOS sow

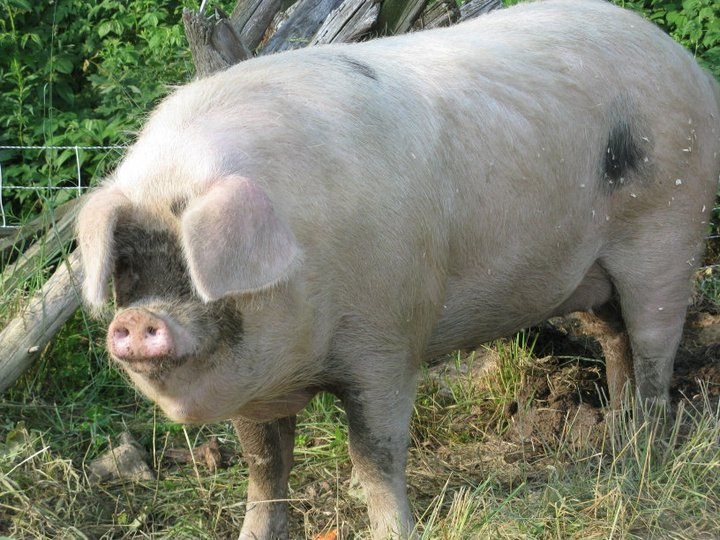
GOS sow

Standards:

- Head: Long length with a slightly dished nose. The ears should be well set apart, dropping forward to the nose.
- Body: The shoulders should be fine but not raised. A long level back with well sprung ribs and a broad loin are desirable. Deep sides, with a thick, full belly and flank from the ribs to hams are standard.
- Hams: Large and well filled to the hocks.
- Legs: Straight and strong.
- Skin and Coat: Skin should not show coarseness or wrinkles. The hair should be silky and straight.
- Teats: There should be at least 14 well-placed teats.

Objections:

- Ears: Short, thick and elevated.
- Coat: A rose disqualifies. A line of mane bristles is objectionable. Sandy colour may disqualify.
- Skin: Serious wrinkles. Blue undertone not associated with a spot.
- Legs: Curved.
- Neck: Heavy jowl objectionable.
