= Small White pig =

Breed of pig

Small White
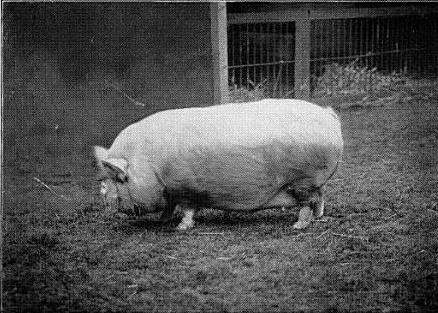
- A Small White, late 19th century
- Conservation status: extinct
- Other names: Small Yorkshire
- Country of origin: United Kingdom

Traits

The Small White or Small Yorkshire was a British breed of domestic pig, common during the nineteenth century. It is now extinct, but its characteristics were used in producing the Middle White and other breeds.

== History and characteristics ==
The Small White was developed in the early nineteenth century by cross-breeding the traditional Old Yorkshire, a large white pig, with imported Chinese pigs. This created a small animal with a pure white ground colour, pricked ears, the short, wide head of the Chinese breeds and their characteristic short upturned snout. In common with the Chinese breeds, it reached maturity early and rapidly put on fat. The Small White was further refined and "improved" during the period by agriculturalists such as Henry Reynolds-Moreton, 2nd Earl of Ducie amongst others.

The Small White was always intended as a show pig rather than as a porker or bacon pig. It was particularly popular with aristocratic and "hobby" breeders, as opposed to farmers or smallholders.

== Creation of the Middle White ==
The Small White proved a popular cross with both the Cumberland pig (now extinct) and the Large White, another Yorkshire breed. This was to lead to the creation of a new type after an incident at the 1852 Keighley Agricultural Show, when pigs belonging to Joseph Tuley, a weaver, were refused entry to the Large White class as they were considered too small; they had been bred by crossing Large White sows with Small White boars. Tuley's pigs were, however, considered good enough that a new breed was created, the Middle White, which went on to be one of the most popular breeds of pig during the late nineteenth and early twentieth century: it retains the distinctive pricked ears and short snout of the Small White.

== Extinction ==
The popularity of the Middle White led to the decline of the Small White breed, and by the turn of the century it had almost disappeared; it became extinct in 1912.
