= British Landrace =

British breed of pig

- Conservation status: Rare breed
- Country of origin: United Kingdom

Traits

The British Landrace is a British breed of domestic pig and one of the most numerous in the United Kingdom. It is pink with heavy drooping ears that cover most of the face and is bred for pork and bacon. The breed originated in the 1949 importation of 12 landrace pigs from Scandinavia — four boars and eight gilts (immature females). In 1950, the British Landrace Pig Society was formed and it opened a herd book for the first offspring born from the imported 12. They created the first pig testing scheme with a testing station at the village of Stockton-on-the-Forest in North Yorkshire.

The breed's popularity may have contributed to a decline in rare breeds in the United Kingdom. The 1955 Howitt report by the Advisory Committee on the Development of Pig Production advised farmers to increase profitability by focusing on just three breeds of pigs — the British Landrace, the Large White and the Welsh. Many farmers acted on the report and as a result many rarer pig breeds have declined. In a 1999 book, Jules Pretty said that seven pig breeds had been lost in Britain in the 20th century, and that the industry was now dominated by the British Landrace and the Large White.

In 1978, the British Landrace Pig Society joined the National Pig Breeders' Association (now the British Pig Association). In the 1980s, the breed was developed and its genetic base was expanded by the importation of new bloodlines from Norway and Finland. These developments have made the British Landrace unique among other Landrace breeds. The British Landrace is also used to improve other breeds. These pigs are found all over the United Kingdom, particularly in the East and in Yorkshire.

== Notes ==
1. Sweden or Denmark
