= Welsh pig =

Breed of pig

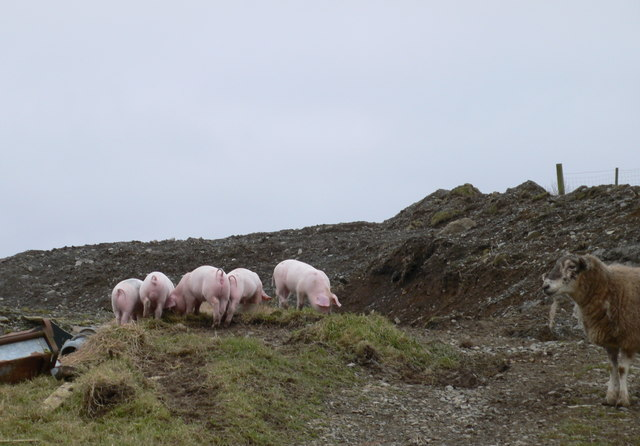
- Pigs on a farm near Ysbyty Ifan, Wales
- Country of origin: Wales

Traits
- Weight: Male: 250 kg (550 lb); Female: 150–200 kg (330–440 lb)

The Welsh is a breed of domestic pig native to Wales. It is a large white breed known for its hardiness in outdoor (extensive) farming, its long, pear-shaped body and its lop-ears. The breed was first mentioned in the 1870s, and after the Howitt committee report in 1955, became the third most common sire in the United Kingdom after the Large White pig and British Landrace pig. The Welsh pig experienced a decline in numbers in the late twentieth century because consumer demands had changed and the carcase was considered too fatty. In 2005 the breed was considered endangered and later came under the auspices of the Rare Breeds Survival Trust. Since then numbers have expanded somewhat, and by 2012, the registered breeding herd had increased to over 1000 animals.

== History ==
Pigs with lop ears have been raised in Wales since time immemorial. The Welsh Pig comes from various Welsh towns. In Mid Wales, Montgomery and Cardigan and also in Carmarthen and Pembroke. The earliest references in literature date back to the 1870s when pigs from Wales and Shropshire were being brought to Cheshire for fattening on milk by-products. It was stated that "the Welsh pigs are generally a yellow-white, but some are spotted black and white. The (Cheshire) dairymen depend more on these Welshmen and proud Salopians than on breeding. The cross of the Manchester boar with the Shropshire and Welsh produces a larger and coarser breed than the small Yorkshire."

There was a decrease in the supply of bacon and pork during World War I, when imports were only available from North America, and in 1918, the Glamorgan Pig Society was formed in South Wales, with the aim of increasing the supply. Two years later, the Welsh Pig Society for West Wales was formed, and after discussion, and as the farmers in Pembrokeshire, Carmarthenshire and Cardiganshire were producing a similar type of pig, in 1922 these two breed societies were amalgamated to form the Welsh Pig Society. This published its first herdbook in 1924. The societies were formed with the specific purpose of protecting and promoting the Welsh pig breed. An additional aim was to disseminate the information that the Welsh pig is a good choice for commercial farming. In 1952, the Welsh Pig Society became a member of the National Pig Breeders Association, now known as the British Pig Association.

After World War II, there was a large increase in the number of Welsh pigs as suitable commercial feed became more available. Licences issued for Welsh boars increased dramatically from 41 in 1949 to 1,363 in 1954. The number of pedigree Welsh sows also increased greatly, rising from 850 in 1952 to 3,736 in 1954. This breed of pig became incredibly popular in the mid-20th century and became a crucial breed for the pig industry. The Howitt Committee was set up in 1955 to consider the future of the pig industry in the United Kingdom. It advised the government to concentrate production on three breeds, the Large White, the Landrace and the Welsh pig, and this led to a decline in the other native breeds.

In 1973 the Rare Breeds Survival Trust was set up to try to prevent the extinction of many of the British traditional breeds. Nowadays, the Welsh pig is not so widely kept as a pure breed but is used extensively in cross-breeding programmes. By 2005, the number of registered breeding animals had dwindled and the Welsh pig was declared "endangered", and later reclassified as a rare breed. This was due to changes in consumer habits and the large numbers of hybrid pigs being produced by the corporate farming industry, which resulted in a dwindling in the pure bred pig population. In 2008 there were 373 registered females from 24 bloodlines, and 108 registered males. By 2012, the numbers had grown, and there were 837 registered females and 238 registered males.

== Description ==
The modern Welsh has a moderately wide head with lopped ears and a straight nose. The ears do not quite extend as far as the snout. The neck is moderately deep and the shoulders are flat at the top, supporting a long, strong and level back. The forelegs are set widely apart and the rib cage is deep. The tail is thick and smooth at the root and the underline of the animal is straight. The loin is well-muscled and the flank and belly are thick. The hind-quarters are strong but not flabby, with well-rounded hams that are firm and thick. The hind legs are of moderate length, straight with good bone and set widely apart. The skin is thin and unwrinkled and the coat is fine and straight. Welsh pigs are generally white in colour but sometimes have a few black spots. Both sexes have at least twelve teats.

Boars are generally about 250 kg (550 lb) in weight and sows range from about 150 to 200 kg (330 to 440 lb). In the nineteenth century, the Welsh was described to have rather long legs and to be a razorback whilst being a slow maturer and coarse-haired. The Welsh pig is a hardy animal and thrives both indoors and in more extensive outdoor systems.

== Uses ==
The Welsh pig is bred commercially because it produces high-quality bacon and pork. It provides a lean carcase with a high killing-out percentage. It retains sufficient fat cover to produce succulent, well-flavoured meat but is not excessively fat. Even when grown on to heavier weights, it grades well. Other advantages include a good feed conversion rate, good mothering abilities and a high survival rate for the piglets. The sows can be used in a breeding programme with Large White or Landrace boars to produce fast-growing, cross-bred progeny, and the boars can also be used on other rare breed sows to produce leaner, faster-growing young with improved conformation.

== See also ==
- List of domestic pig breeds
