= Large White pig =

British breed of pig

Large White
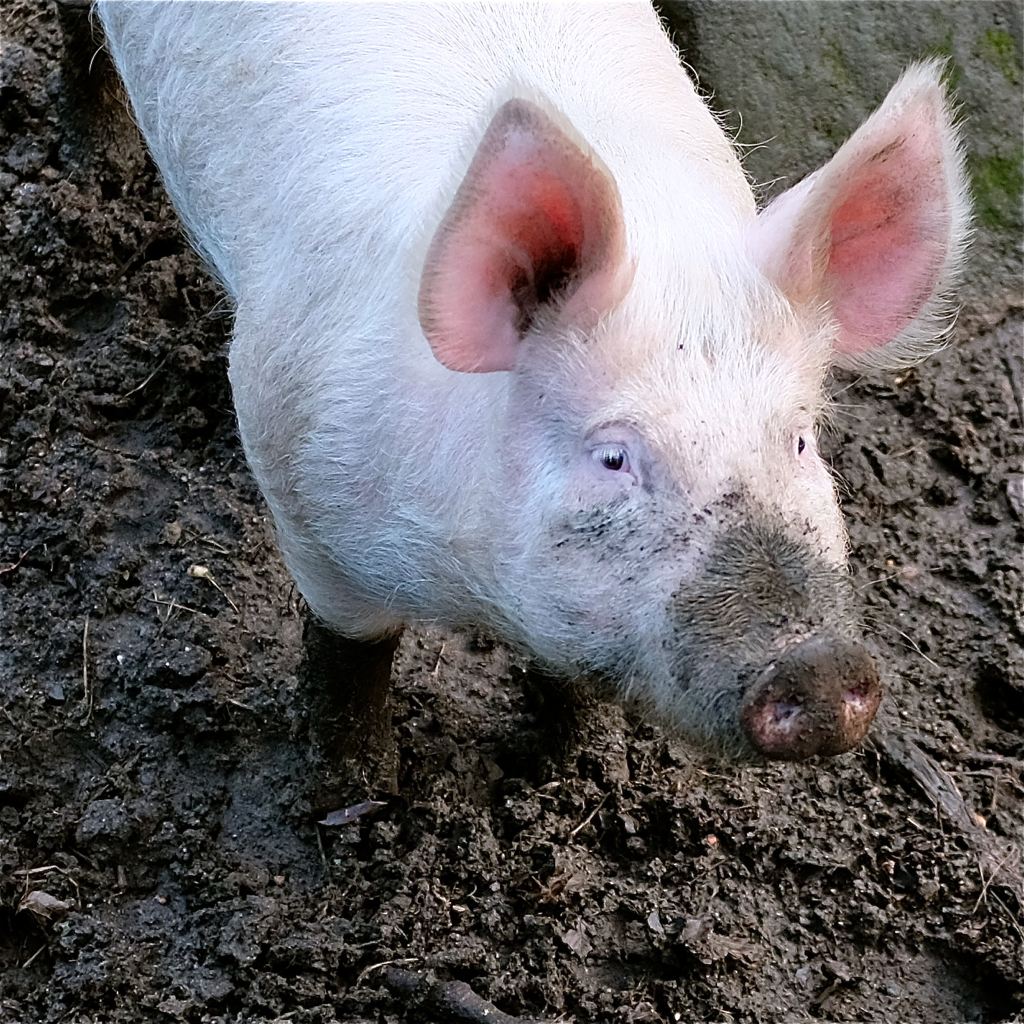
- Boar

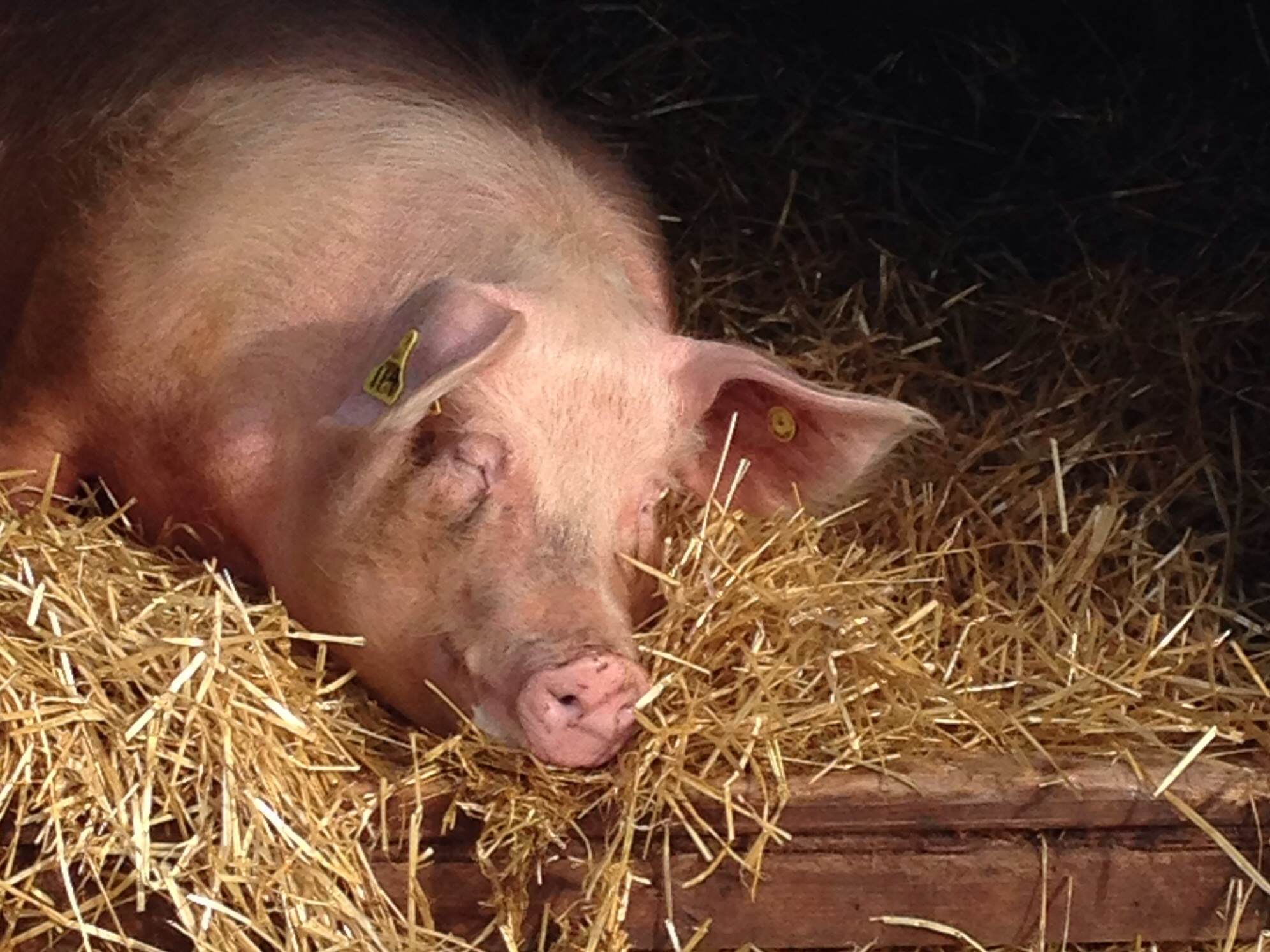
- Sow
- Other names: Yorkshire
- Country of origin: United Kingdom
- Standard: British Pig Association

Traits
- Hair: white

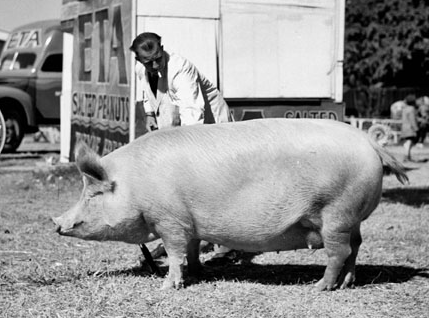
Champion sow in Queensland, 1951

The Large White is a British breed of domestic pig. It derives from the old Large Yorkshire breed from the county of Yorkshire, in northern England.

== History ==
The Large White derives from the old Large Yorkshire breed, a long-legged and heavy-boned pig from the county of Yorkshire, in northern England. In the nineteenth century this was crossed with pigs imported from China, giving rise to three distinct types or breeds: the Small White showed the greatest Asian influence, small and fat with a markedly foreshortened snout; the Middle White also showed some foreshortening of the face; the Large White was the least obviously influenced by the Chinese admixture. It may also have been influenced by the Cumberland and Leicestershire breeds.

A pair of pigs of Large White type were shown at the Royal Agricultural Show in Windsor in 1851. The breed was recognised in 1868, and a herd-book was started in 1884.

The Large White has been exported to many countries of the world. The American Yorkshire of North America derives from it.

== Characteristics ==
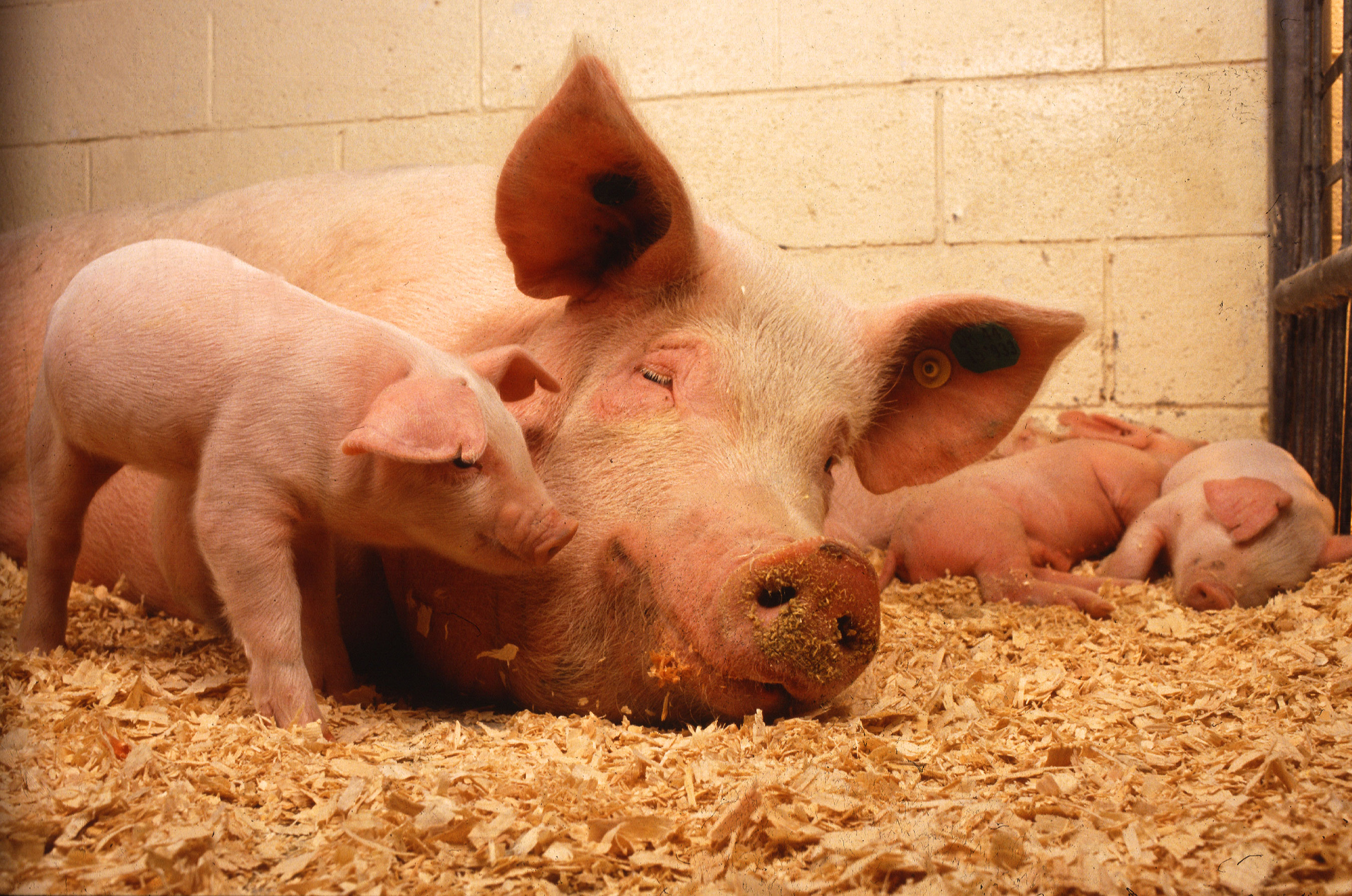
A sow with piglets

The Large White is a big, white pig, with erect ears and a slightly dished face. Sows farrow large litters and produce abundant milk.

== Use ==
The Large White is one of the most numerous of all pig breeds, widely used in crossbreeding for intensive pig farming around the world. It was originally developed as an outdoor breed, but today it is one of those favoured by commercial pig breeders.
