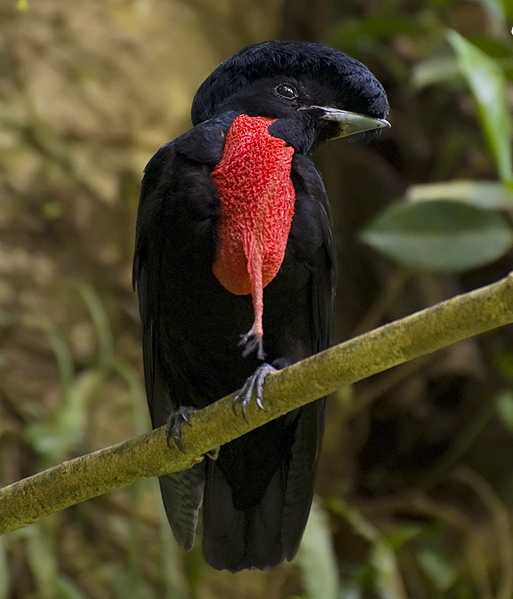
- Male

Conservation status
- Endangered (IUCN 3.1)

Scientific classification
- Kingdom: Animalia
- Phylum: Chordata
- Class: Aves
- Order: Passeriformes
- Family: Cotingidae
- Genus: Cephalopterus
- Species: C. glabricollis

Binomial name
- Cephalopterus glabricollis Gould, 1851

= Bare-necked umbrellabird =

Species of bird

The bare-necked umbrellabird (Cephalopterus glabricollis) is a species of bird in the family Cotingidae. It is found in the Talamancan montane forests of Costa Rica and Panama. Bare-necked umbrellabirds live only in forests and their diet consists mainly of fruits.

Its natural habitats are subtropical or tropical moist lowland forest and subtropical or tropical moist montane forest. It is threatened by habitat loss.

== Taxonomy and systematics ==
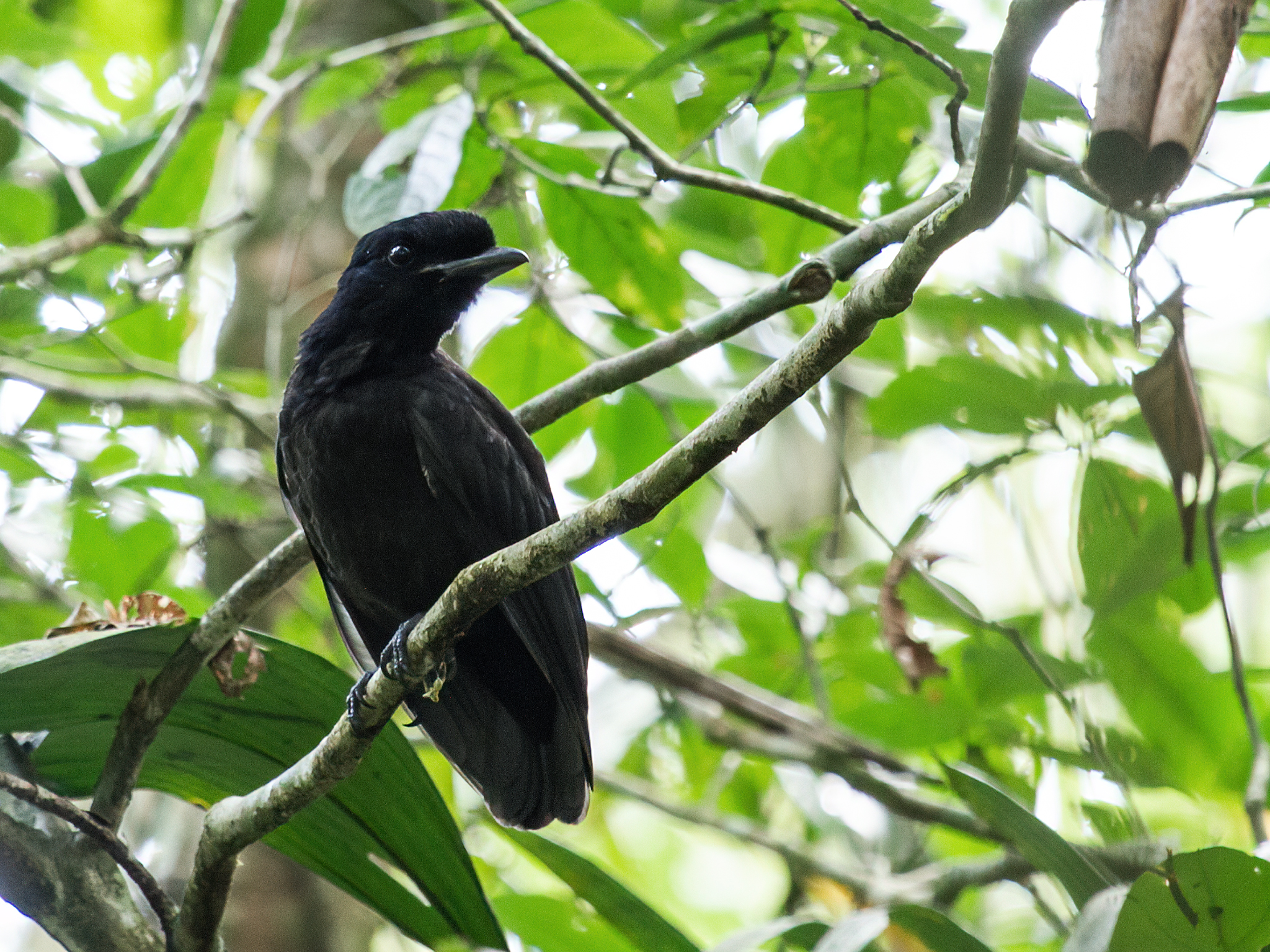
Female from La Selva Biological Station, Heredia, Costa Rica.

The bare-necked umbrellabird is one of three species in the genus Cephalopterus, commonly known as the umbrellabirds. It was first described by John Gould in 1851, on the basis of specimens collected by Warzewickz at elevations of 8,000 ft (2,400 m) in Panama. The generic name Cephalopterus comes from the Greek κεφαλη (kephalē), meaning head, and πτερος (pteros), meaning feathered, referring to the head plumes of the Amazonian umbrellabird. The specific epithet glabricollis is from the Latin glaber, meaning bald, and collis, meaning necked. It is monotypic.

== Description ==
The bare-necked umbrellabird is a large, bulky, and crow-like bird, being the largest passerine in its range. It is also among the largest of the cotingas, with only the Amazonian umbrellabird being larger. The males are larger than the females, being 41 cm (16 in) in length and weighing 450 g (16 oz), compared to the females' 36 cm (14 in) and 320 g (11 oz).

== Distribution and habitat ==
The bare-necked umbrellabird is found in Panama, Costa Rica, and southern Nicaragua. It inhabits the subcanopy to upper understory of primary forest throughout its range, although some birds have been seen foraging in secondary forest. It can also be found in areas with dense understory and near fruiting trees. The species follows an annual altitudinal migration based on fruit availability, with most of the year being spent in lowlands between elevations of 100–500 m (330–1,640 ft) for males and at 200 m (660 ft) for females. During the breeding season between March–June, umbrellabird populations move higher up to elevations of 1,000–1,500 m (3,300–4,900 ft), coinciding with the highest fruit availability in these areas.

== Behavior and ecology ==
=== Diet ===
The bare-necked umbrellabird is mainly frugivorous, feeding on Marcgraviaceae, Urticaceae, Arecaceae, Lauraceae and Annonaceae berries, along with other fruits. It has also been known to feed on lizards, frogs, insects and larvae. Fruits are plucked from vegetation in flight or gleaned with heavy hops. A juvenile was also observed eating arthropods that were flushed out by a swarm of army ants in Costa Rica.

=== Breeding ===
Breeding occurs between March and June in Costa Rica and between April and September in Panama. Like other cotingas, male bare-necked umbrellabirds perform leks to attract females.

== Status ==
It is listed as endangered on the IUCN Red List. As of 2021, its global population is estimated to be 1,900 – 7,100 mature individuals and decreasing.
