= Lithuanian Native pig =

Lithuanian breed of pig

Lithuanian Native
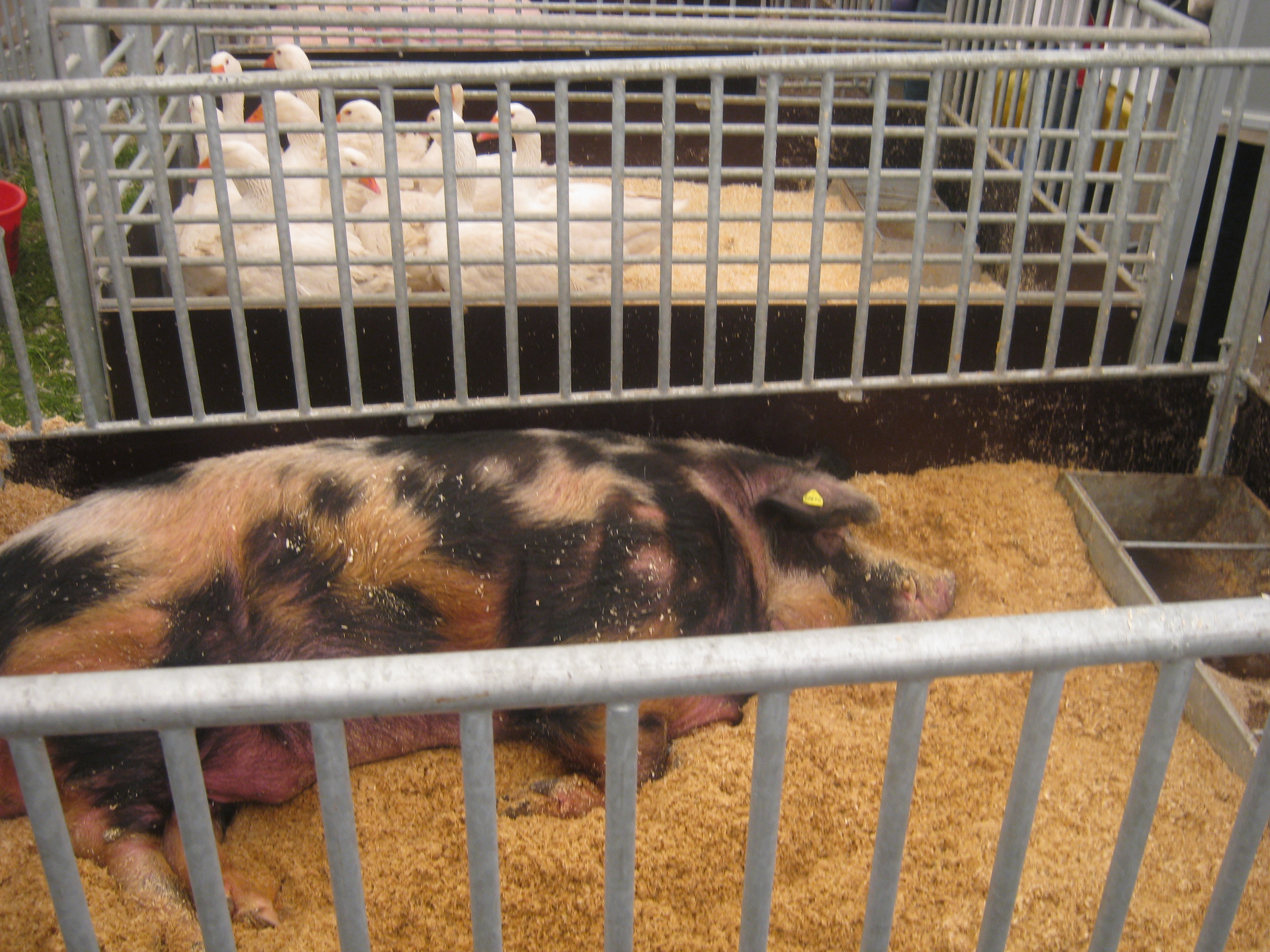
- Conservation status: FAO (2007): not at risk; DAD-IS (2024): at risk/critical
- Other names: Lietuvos Vietinė; Lithuanian Indigenous Wattle; Native Lithuanian
- Country of origin: Lithuania

Traits
- Weight: Male: 180 kg; Female: 150 kg
- Height: Male: 79 cm; Female: 71 cm

The Lithuanian Native or Lithuanian: Lietuvos Vietinė is a traditional Lithuanian breed of domestic pig. In the twenty-first century it is an endangered breed, kept principally for conservation reasons. The principal herd is kept at the Centre for Farm Animal Genetic Resources of Baisogala, in the Radviliškis District Municipality of central Lithuania.

== History ==
The Lithuanian Native is a traditional breed of rural Lithuania. In the Soviet era in the twentieth century, it was extensively cross-bred with more productive modern pigs to create the Lithuanian White.

In 1993 a herd of about 200 of the original pigs was established at the Institute of Animal Sciences. In 2003 a total population of 6259 was reported to DAD-IS, and the breed was calculated to constitute 0.59% of the total pig population of the country; in 2007 its conservation status was listed by the FAO as 'not at risk'. A herd book for the breed was established in 2008. In 2024 its conservation status was listed as 'at risk/critical', based on a reported total population for 2023 of 111, of which 74 were breeding sows.

== Characteristics ==
Typical features include wattles on the neck, and usually large black spots on the body, but colour variations include black-and-white, ginger, black, and tri-coloured. They have a friendly temperament. Being insensitive to the sun, these pigs are suitable for grazing.

== Use ==
The Lithuanian Native's characteristics were used in producing the Lithuanian White and many Russian breeds.
