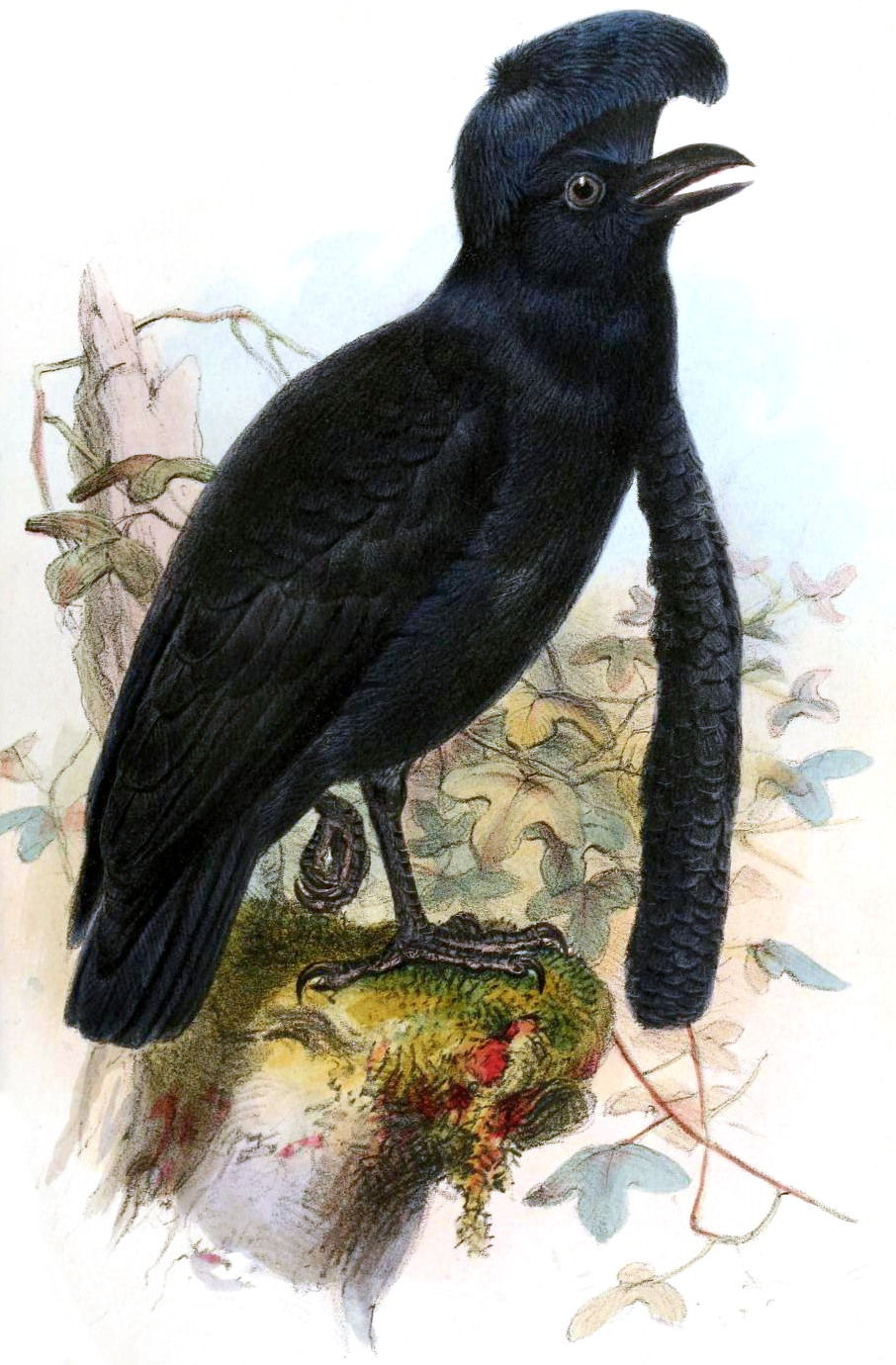
- Long-wattled umbrellabird (Cephalopterus penduliger)

Scientific classification
- Kingdom: Animalia
- Phylum: Chordata
- Class: Aves
- Order: Passeriformes
- Family: Cotingidae
- Genus: Cephalopterus; E. Geoffroy Saint-Hilaire, 1809

Type species
- Cephalopterus ornatus E. Geoffroy Saint-Hilaire, 1809

Species
- Long-wattled umbrellabird; Amazonian umbrellabird; Bare-necked umbrellabird

= Umbrellabird =

Umbrellabirds

Genus of birds

Umbrellabird is the common name referring to three species of birds in the genus Cephalopterus. They are named for their distinct umbrella-like hoods.

The umbrellabird was described by Sir Alfred Wallace in the 1800s while on an expedition to South America. Umbrellabirds face habitat loss, and two of the three species are at risk of extinction.

== Basic Information ==
Umbrellabirds can be found in the rainforests of Central and South America. They are generally solitary, but known to co-inhabit areas with other birds including other umbrellabirds, and similar species such as woodpeckers.

With a total length of 35–50 cm (14–19.5 in), it is among the largest members of the cotinga family, and the male Amazonian umbrellabird is the largest passerine in South America. The typical weight of an umbrellabird ranges from 320 to 570 g (0.71 to 1.26 lb), with a wingspan reaching about 66 to 71 cm (26 to 28 in).

Umbrellabirds are thought to live for an average of 16 years in the wild.

== Physiology ==
The umbrellabird is almost entirely black, and has a conspicuous crest on the top of its head, vaguely resembling an umbrella (hence its common name). This bird has strong legs, short feet, acute claws, broad wings, and a thick bill. All have an inflatable wattle on the neck, which serves to amplify their loud, booming calls. From this loud and deep voice, it has received its Indian name ueramimbé, meaning "piper-bird". It utters its call early in the morning and in the afternoon. This wattle may reach a length of 35 cm (14 in) in the long-wattled umbrellabird, but it is smaller in the two remaining species, and covered in bare, bright-red skin in the bare-necked umbrellabird. Umbrellabirds produce one of the deepest songs (less than 300 Hz) among passerines. The umbrellabird finds flying difficult because of its large size, but can indeed fly short distances, although it tends to be relatively slow and clunky in the air. So, it exhibits hopping between different branches with the help of its clawed toes. Females resemble males, but are noticeably smaller and have a reduced crest and wattle.

== Behavior ==
The lifestyle of the umbrellabird is diurnal, which means that it searches for food during the day time and roosts at night. When sleeping, it resembles a pile of black feathers, with neither its feet nor head visible due to its wings and head crest. The umbrellabird feeds on fruits, large insects, and occasionally small vertebrates (e.g. lizards). As it feeds on seeds or ingests a seed while eating a fruit, it plays a role in its native ecosystem by distributing the seeds across the forest floor, which spreads the plants' range. These birds are also known as altitudinal migrants because of their ability to migrate up and down the mountains instead of typical north–south across the land.

The males gather in loose leks, where they call and extend their wattles to attract females. Breeding generally runs from March until early June. The flimsy nest is built entirely by the females, which incubate and raise the chicks without help from the males. The nest is made from moss, leaves, and twigs that are present inside the tree. The nest is made far from the ground so it can be well protected from predators of the eggs. The female lays a single egg, occasionally two, which is incubated for only a month before it hatches, with the chick then being fed by its mother before it leaves the nest a few months later.

== Conservation status ==
Two of the three species, the long-wattled and bare-necked umbrellabirds, are threatened by habitat loss. Since the umbrellabird spends most of its time at the tops of trees, ground-dwelling predators pose little threat to this unique bird. Monkeys and snakes are their primary predators, along with large birds of prey such as hawks and eagles that are able to hunt from the air. Populations are decreasing in large part from human encroachment on their native lowland forests, generally for agriculture. Other reasons for their habitat loss include logging, banana and palm oil plantations, or being hunted for meat or the pet trade.

== Other names ==
Other common names are bullbird, coracine ombrelle in French, Nacktkehl-Schirmvogel in German, and pájaro paraguas de cuello desnudo in Spanish.

== Species ==
Image	Scientific name	Common name	Distribution	Conservation status
	Cephalopterus penduliger	Long-wattled umbrellabird	Southwestern part of Colombia to the province of El Oro in Ecuador	Vulnerable
	Cephalopterus ornatus	Amazonian umbrellabird	Amazon basin	Least-concern
	Cephalopterus glabricollis	Bare-necked umbrellabird	Costa Rica and Panama	Endangered
