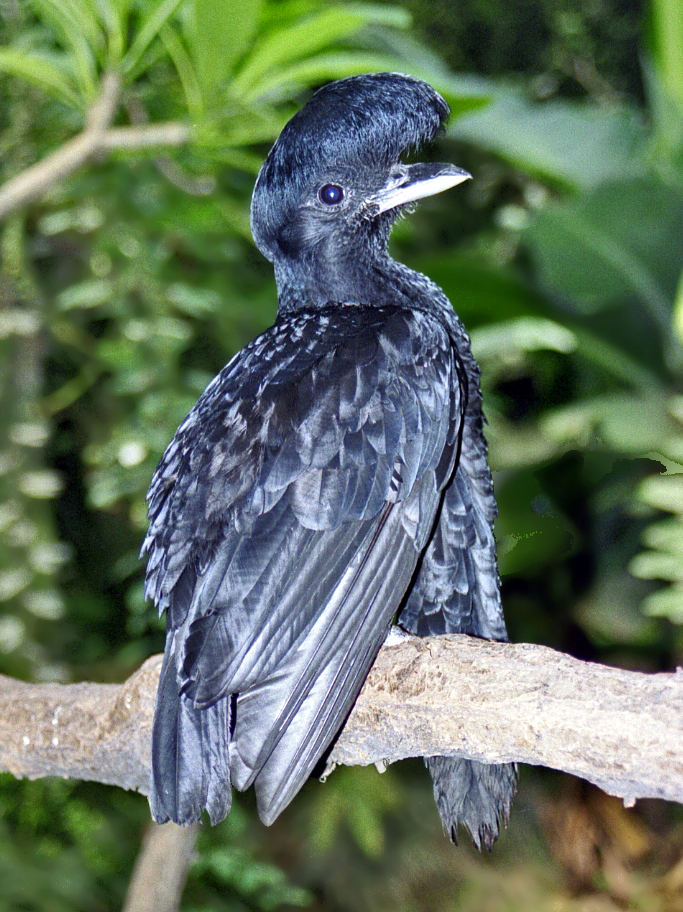
- at Skansen Zoo in Stockholm

Conservation status
- Vulnerable (IUCN 3.1)

Scientific classification
- Kingdom: Animalia
- Phylum: Chordata
- Class: Aves
- Order: Passeriformes
- Family: Cotingidae
- Genus: Cephalopterus
- Species: C. penduliger

Binomial name
- Cephalopterus penduliger Sclater, PL, 1859

= Long-wattled umbrellabird =

Bird of western Colombia and Ecuador

The long-wattled umbrellabird (Cephalopterus penduliger) is an umbrellabird in the Cotingidae family. Its Spanish names include pájaro bolsón, pájaro toro, dungali, and vaca del monte. The long-wattled umbrellabird is considered rare and it resides in humid to wet premontane and cloud forest. They are often found on the Pacific slopes of southwest Colombia and western Ecuador, but occasionally are found at lower altitudes.

== Description ==
The male is 40–42 cm in height, with the female being slightly smaller at 35–37 cm. Both sexes are short-tailed and carry an erectile head crest; those of the males are slightly longer at 20–30 cm. The male is distinguished by a large throat wattle of feathers, while females and juveniles have no or a much smaller wattle. The length of the wattle can be controlled, and it can be retracted in flight. The male generally has black colored shafts in its feathers.

The long-wattled umbrellabird's specific name penduliger derives from Latin pendulus, hanging, and refers to the wattle.

== Distribution and habitat ==
The species shows a high level of endemism and is found from the southwestern part of Colombia to the province of El Oro in Ecuador, in the bioregion of Tumbes–Chocó–Magdalena. It inhabits humid montane forests at 1,500-1,800 m above sea level on the ridges and sides of the Andes range.

== Ecology ==
=== Feeding ===
The species is mostly frugivorous, and feeds on large fruit. The fruits of the Arecaceae, Lauraceae, and Myrtaceae are preferred. Invertebrates and small vertebrates are also taken.

=== Reproduction ===
The long-wattled umbrellabird engages in lek mating, where the males congregate in common areas (leks) for display, which are visited by the solitary females. Females select a male with prominent secondary traits such as aggression and territorial behavior. Nests are built in trees or treeferns, and have been recorded at heights of 4.5–5.0 m above ground.

Clutch sizes in the genus Cephalopterus are generally low; only one egg is laid per nesting attempt. Incubation lasts 27 or 28 days. Only the female incubates and cares for the nestling. She provides food for the nestling on average once per hour and includes invertebrates, vertebrates, and regurgitated material.

== Conservation ==
The species has been classified as vulnerable by the IUCN. A total population of 7,500-15,000 mature individuals was estimated in 2023. It is thought to be under pressure from habitat destruction through deforestation and from hunting. The easy-to-locate lek mating areas make it particularly susceptible to trapping.

The long-wattled umbrellabird is present in several protected areas. The consolidation of existing scattered reserves, as well as the nomination of several existing protected areas as biosphere reserves, could be very beneficial for the species. The curating of forest composition and reforestation have been pointed out as important approaches.
