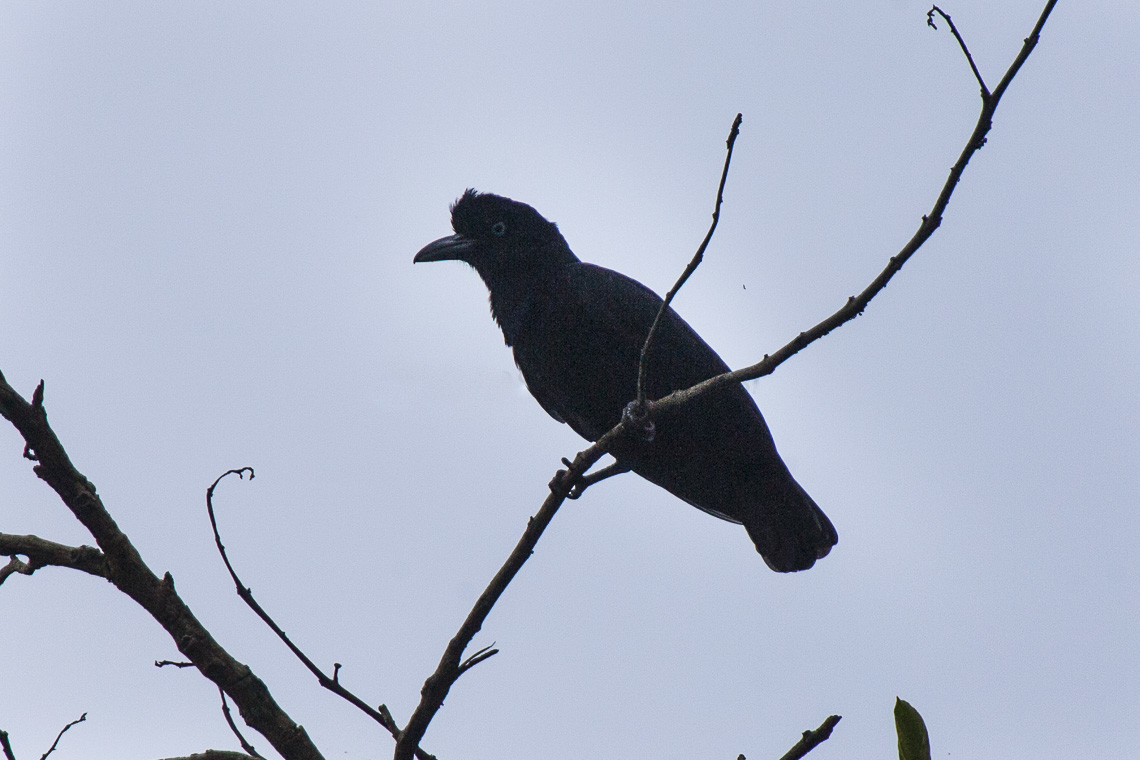
- Female

Conservation status
- Least Concern (IUCN 3.1)

Scientific classification
- Kingdom: Animalia
- Phylum: Chordata
- Class: Aves
- Order: Passeriformes
- Family: Cotingidae
- Genus: Cephalopterus
- Species: C. ornatus

Binomial name
- Cephalopterus ornatus É. Geoffroy Saint-Hilaire, 1809

= Amazonian umbrellabird =

Species of bird

The Amazonian umbrellabird (Cephalopterus ornatus) is a species of bird in the family Cotingidae native to the Amazon basin with a separate population on the eastern slopes of the Andes. The male bird is entirely black, with a black crest and inflatable wattle on the throat, and at 48 to 55 cm (19 to 22 in), may be the largest passerine bird in South America. The female is slightly smaller. Both have an undulating flight, described as woodpecker-like, and the male has a loud, booming call.

The Amazonian umbrellabird feeds on fruit and berries, and may opportunistically take insects and spiders. It forages singly, in pairs or in small groups, in the forest canopy, hopping from branch to branch, but is a secretive species and is more often heard than seen.

== Description ==
Much larger than the female, the male Amazonian umbrellabird is likely the largest passerine in South America as well as the largest suboscine passerine in the world. The male Amazonian umbrellabird grows to a weight of 480–571 grams (1.06–1.26 lb) and a length of 48–55 centimetres (18.9–21.7 in). The female typically stands 41–44 centimetres (16.1–17.3 in) tall and weighs up to 380 grams (0.84 lb). As in the other umbrellabirds, the Amazonian umbrellabird is almost entirely black, has a conspicuous crest on the top of their head, and an inflatable wattle on the neck, which serves to amplify their loud, booming calls. This species has pale eyes, whereas in other umbrellabirds, the eye is black. The undulating flying method of this species is considered quite woodpecker-like, with the lack of white on the umbrellabird's plumage distinguishing it from large woodpeckers with which it co-exists. The Amazonian umbrellabird is usually seen flying only across openings in the forest, such as over rivers, and usually boldly hops branch to branch while in trees.

== Distribution ==
It is present in almost the entirety of the immense Amazon basin, from the Andean foothills of Colombia, Ecuador, Peru and Bolivia, to the east to the south of Venezuela (basins of the upper and middle Orinoco River), locally in the southwest of Guyana, and Brazil (eastward to the Negro and Xingú river basins, southward to southern Mato Grosso, reaching the headwaters of the Paraguay River).

This species occurs in two main populations: One found in woodland and forest, mainly near rivers, in the Amazon basin, and a second found in forested foothills of the eastern Andes. The Amazonian umbrellabird is found variously in small groups, pairs or individually. They are usually seen in or near the canopy, but due to their wary behavior and scarcity at open spots, they are easily missed for a bird of this size. They are heard in the field more often than they are seen. Fruit and berries are usually preferred, but insects, spiders, and insect larvae are eaten opportunistically.

== Gallery ==
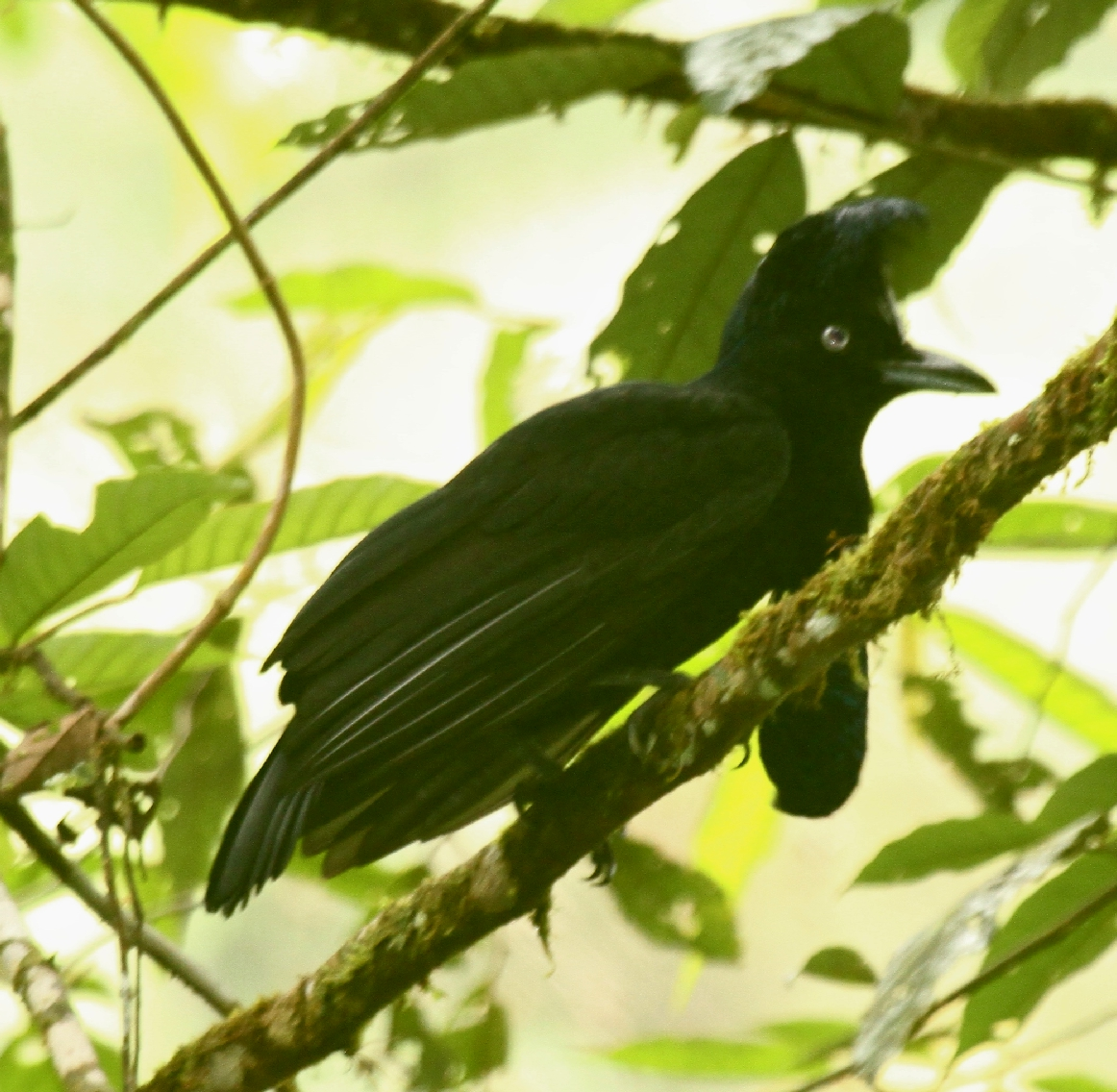
Podocarpus Reserve - Ecuador

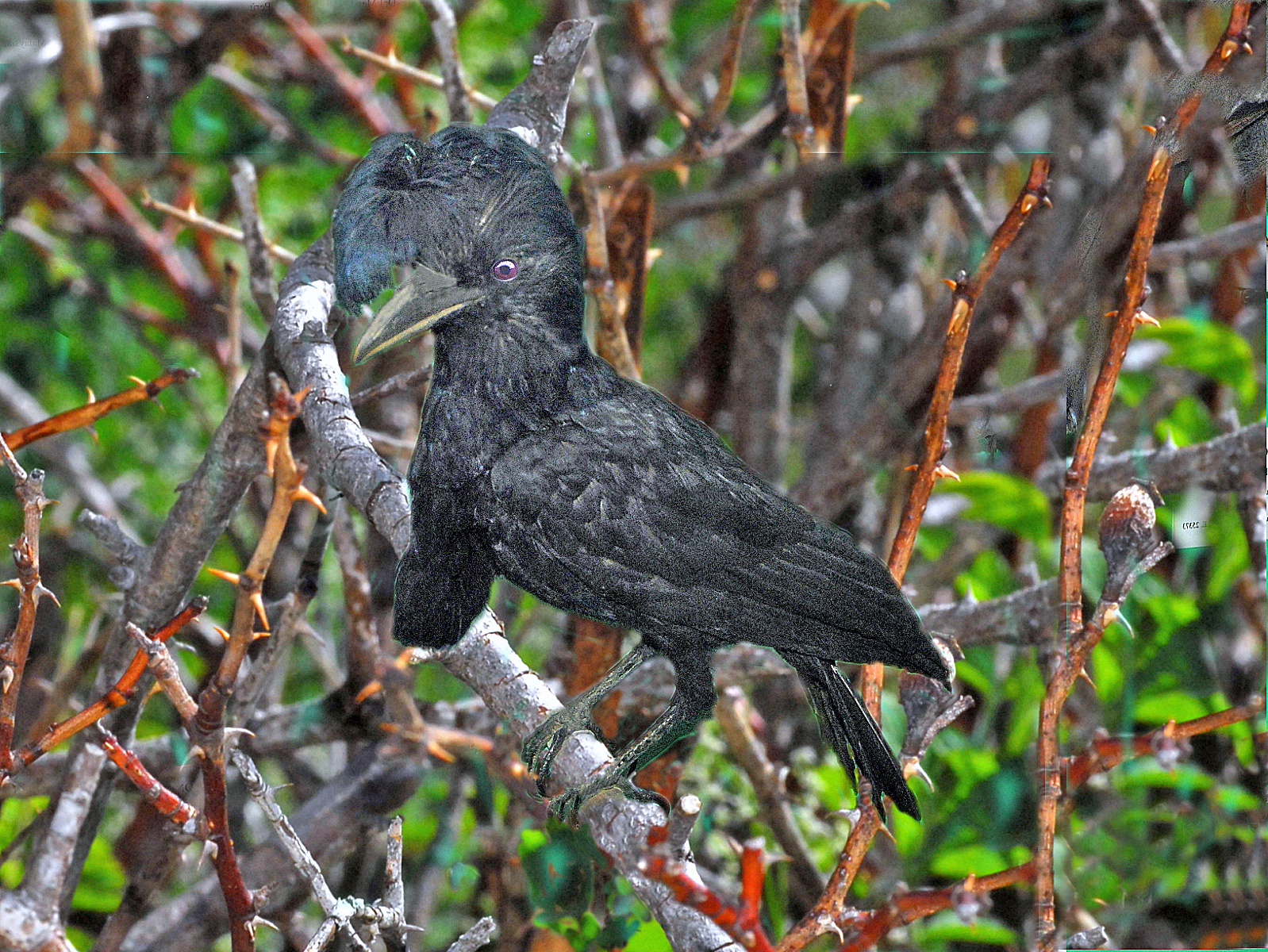
Cephalopterus ornatus from Guyana

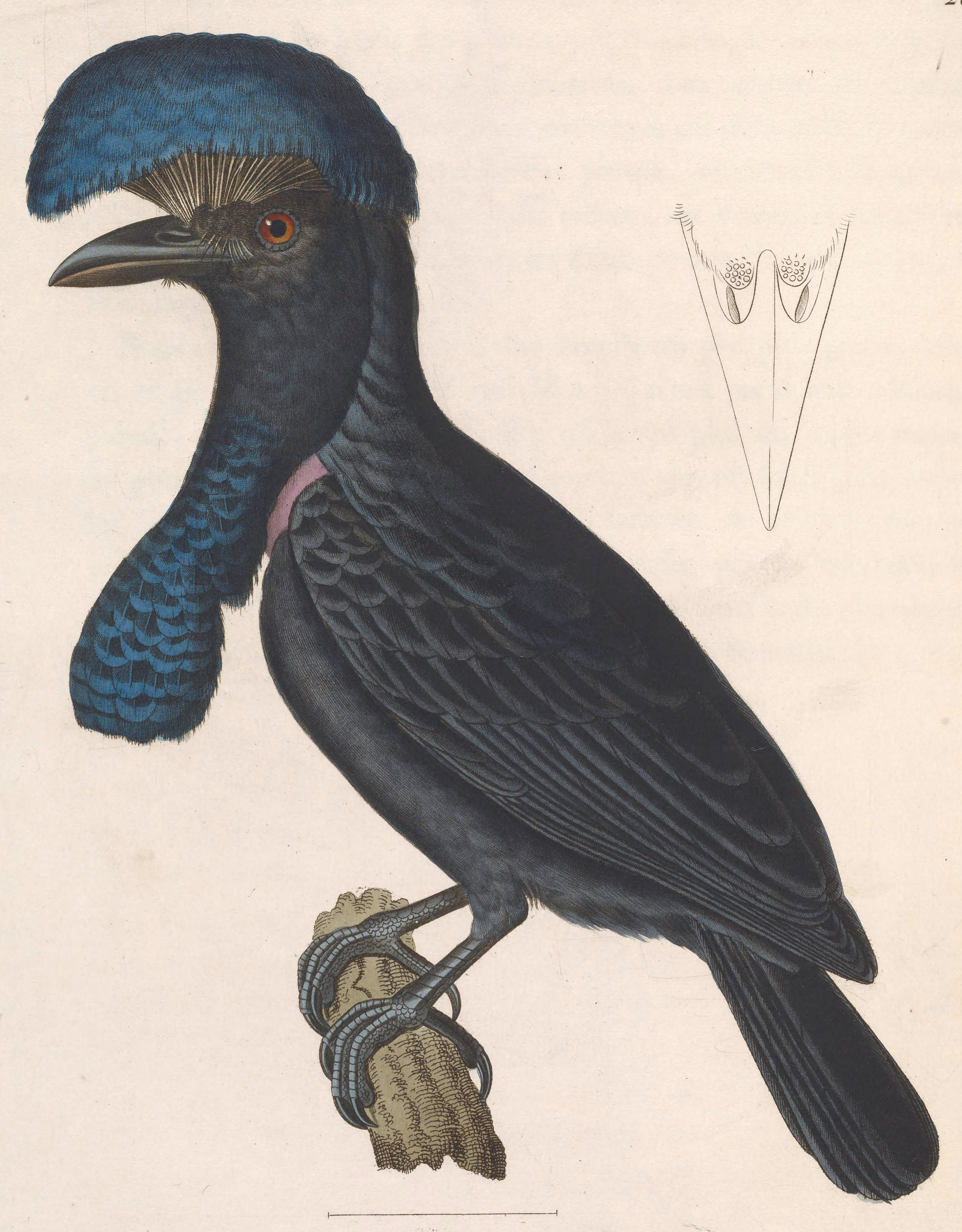
Illustration from "Nouveau recueil de planches coloriées d'oiseaux"
