= English Carrier pigeon =

Pigeon breed

Carrier
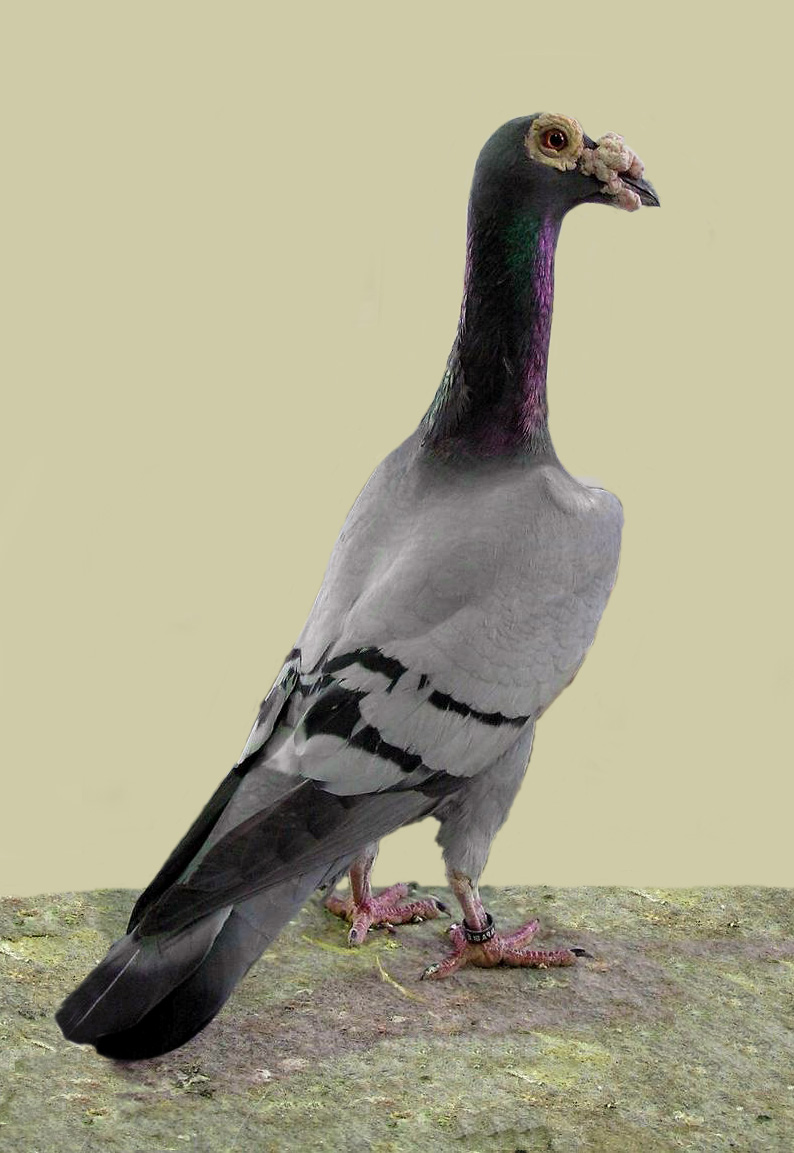
- A blue bar English Carrier
- Conservation status: Common
- Other names: English Carrier
- Nicknames: King of the Doos
- Country of origin: England

Classification
- Australian Breed Group: Homers and Hens Group 4
- US Breed Group: Wattle
- EE Breed Group: Wattle

Notes
- One of the oldest fancy breeds.

The Carrier or English Carrier is a breed of fancy pigeon developed over many years of selective breeding. Carriers, along with other varieties of domesticated pigeons, are all descendants of the rock dove (Columba livia). They have a long slender body, with a long neck in proportion to the rest of the body, and distinctive features including a rounded hard wattle.

== History ==
The breed was developed in England from a combination of non–European breeds, including the Persian and Baghdad carriers, and the pouter. The largest of the flying pigeon breeds, the Old English Carrier was originally used for sending messages.

By the mid 19th century, the points in the standard of the English Carrier were deemed to have been achieved, and the breed was praised for its "perfectness to which all the points most admired have been brought". At this point the colours of the breed were limited to black, white and dun (a brownish grey colour). Today, the English Carrier is strictly a show pigeon, and is not the modern homing pigeon.

== Description ==
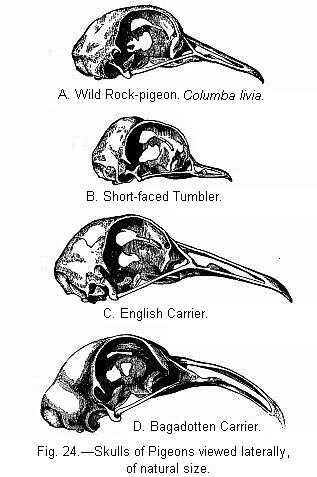
The skull of the English Carrier (c) compared with other types of pigeon

Charles Darwin wrote of the Carrier in The Variation of Animals and Plants Under Domestication, "This is a fine bird, of large size, close feathered, generally dark–coloured, with an elongated neck". Darwin compared the dimensions of the breed to the rock dove, showing the length of the Carrier to be nearly double that of the rock dove. It was also found that the English Carrier could open its mouth wider than the rock dove, 0.75 inches (1.9 cm) as compared to 0.4 inches (1.0 cm).

The English Carrier is typically about 17.5–18.5 inches (44–47 cm) in height, with a long, slender body. The breast bone should be straight and long, as should the back which should slope towards the rump. They have a slender neck which should appear long in proportion to the rest of the bird and the legs should be solid, with no feathering below the knees.

The English Carrier has typically deep red eyes, and a distinctive wattle which should be large but firm with a rounded shape and a powdery white finish on the surface. The beak is long and thick, and is of the type known as a box beak. The National English Carrier Club standard states that ideally the distance from the pupil of the eye to the tip of the beak should be not less than 2 inches (5.1 cm) in females, and 2.5 inches (6.4 cm) in males of the breed.

== Gallery ==
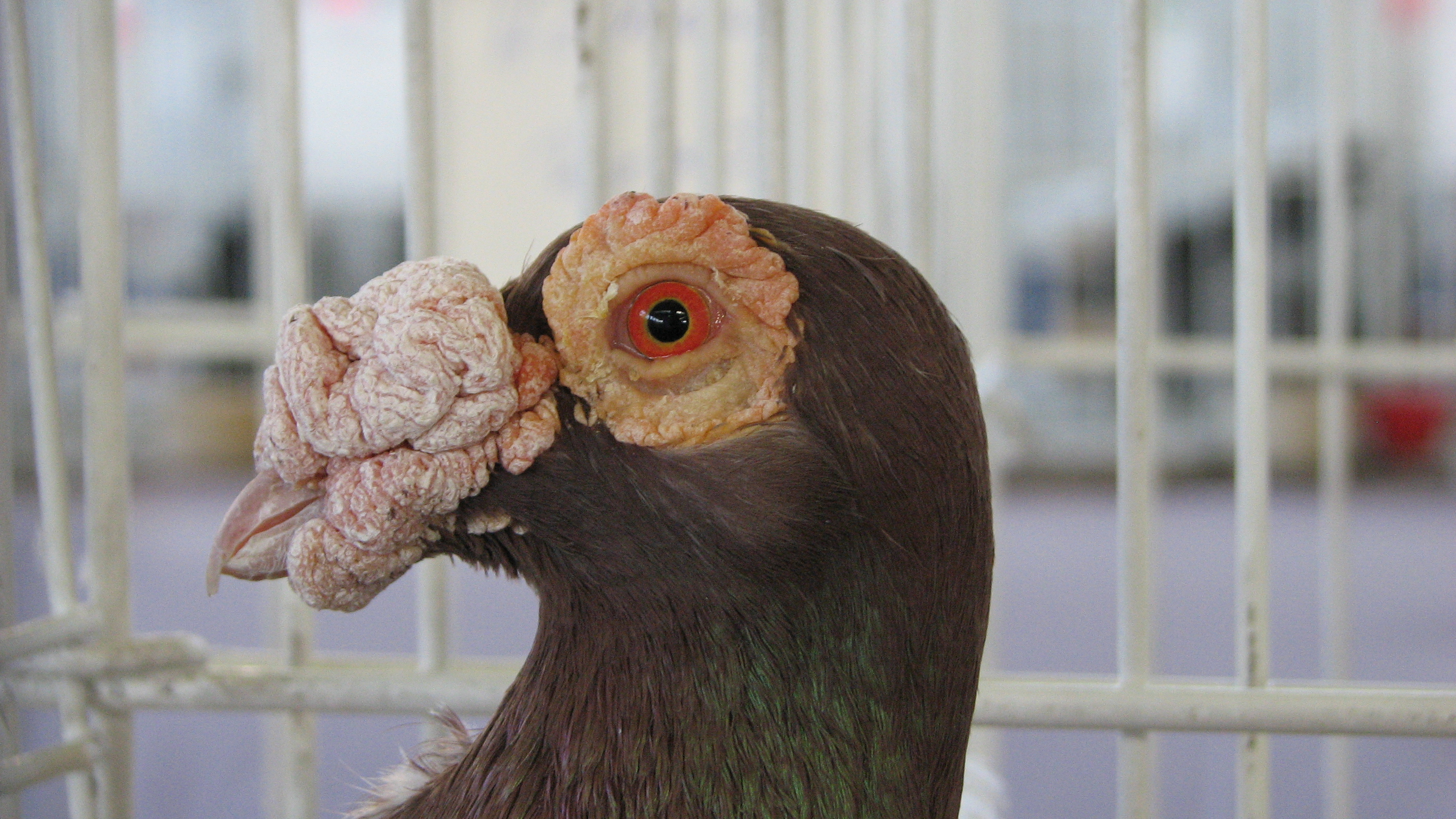
Carrier head view

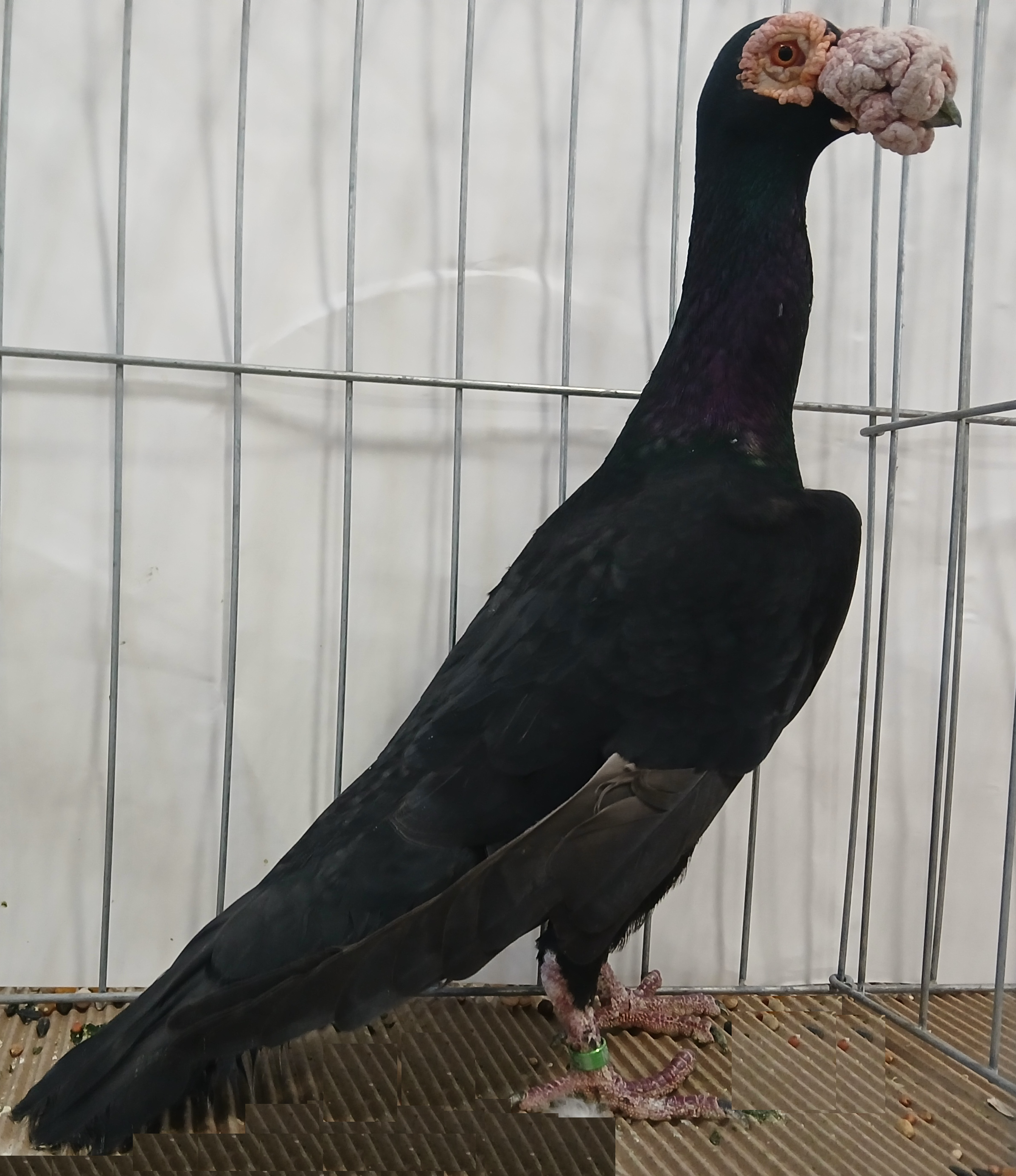
Black

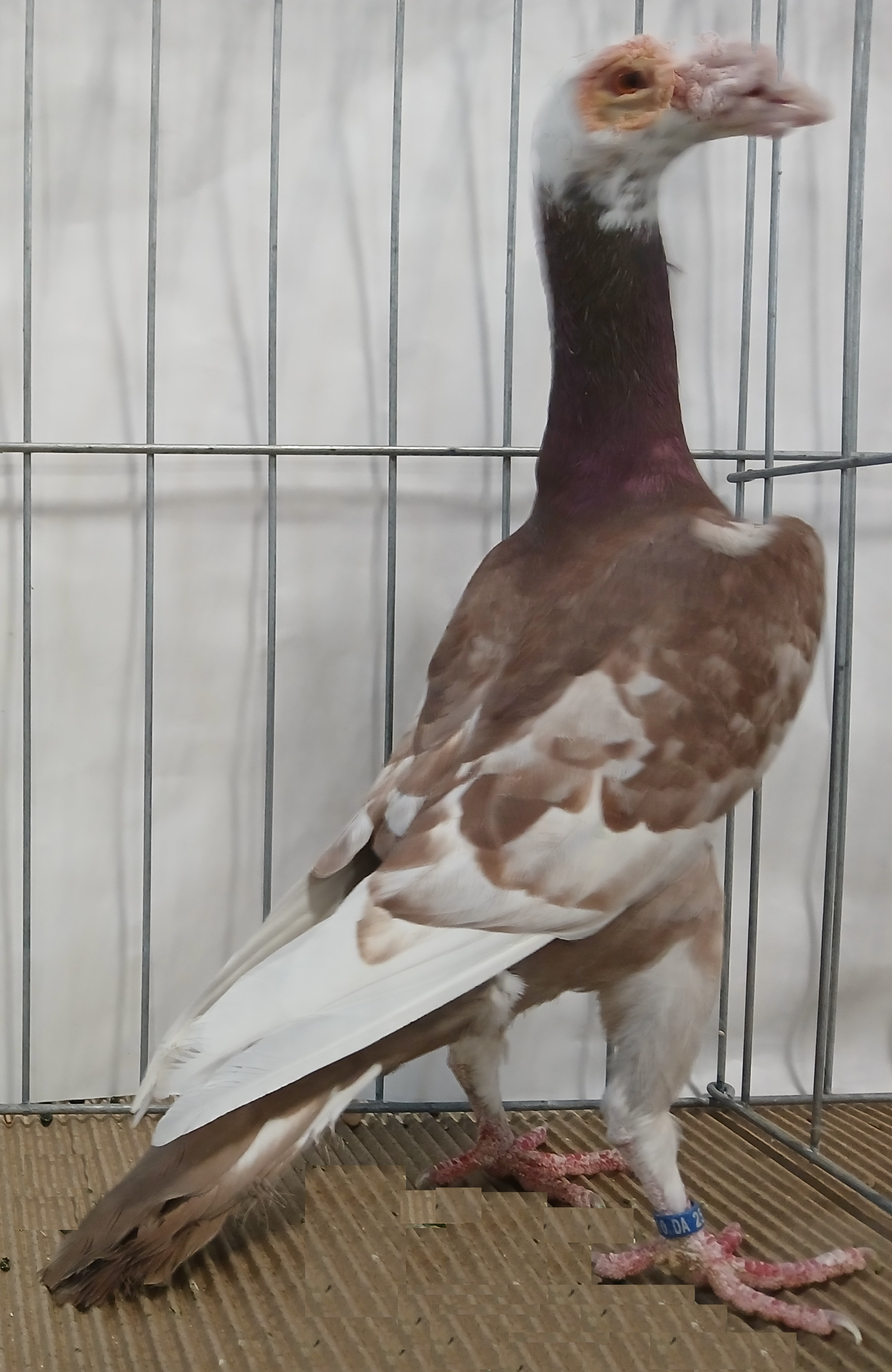
Ash red

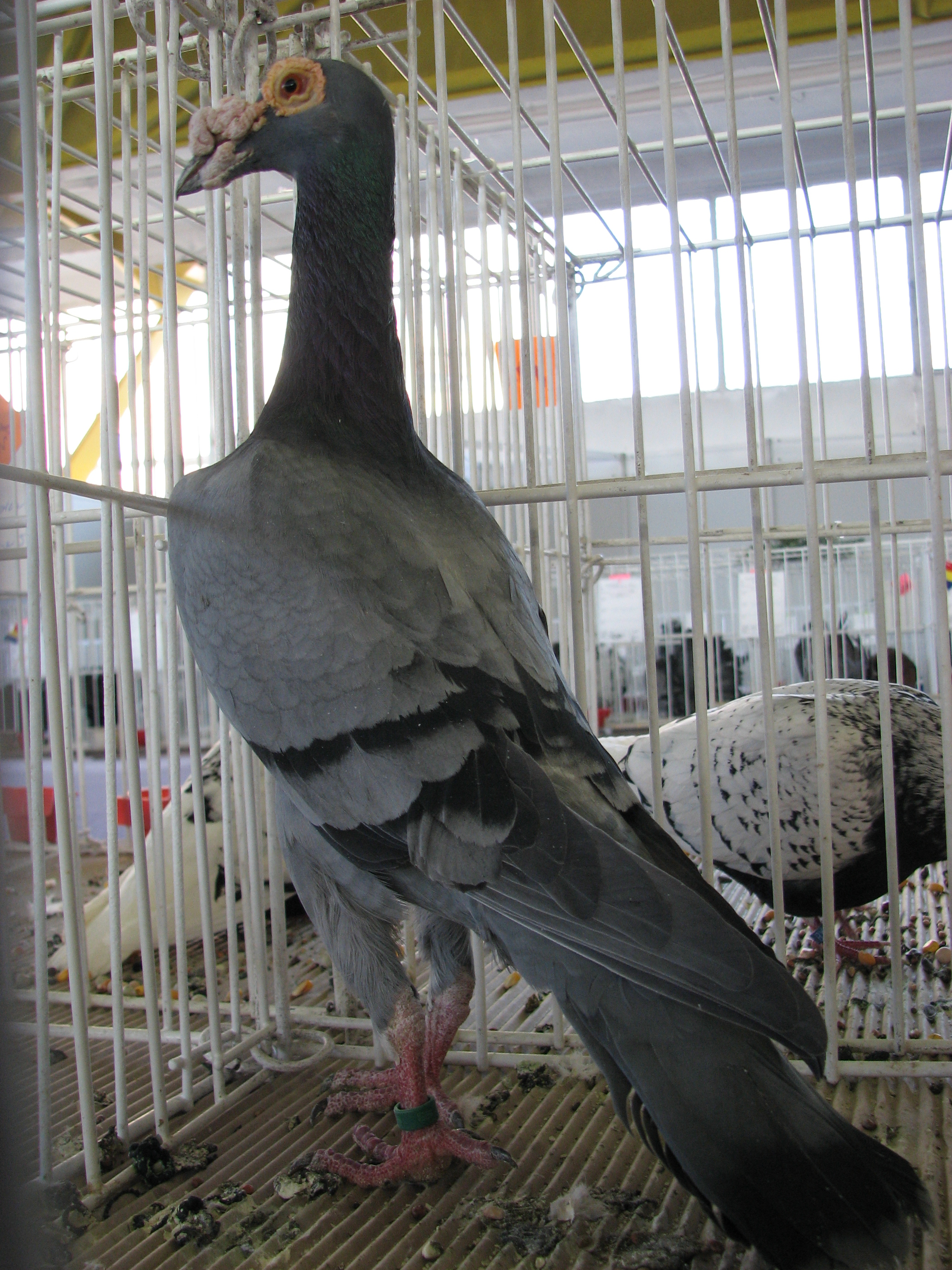
Blue bar Carrier

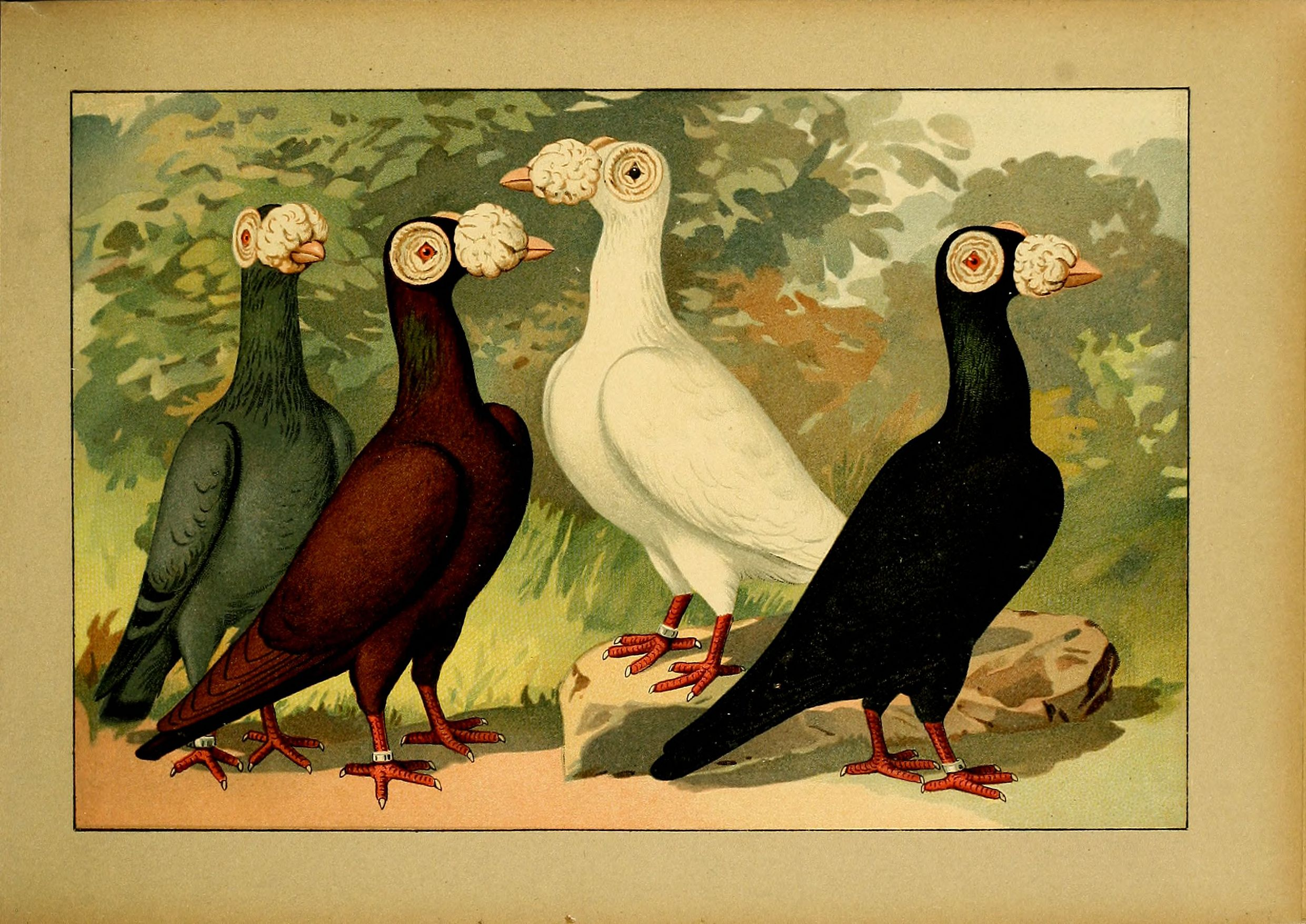
Schachtzabel 1906 Tafel 08

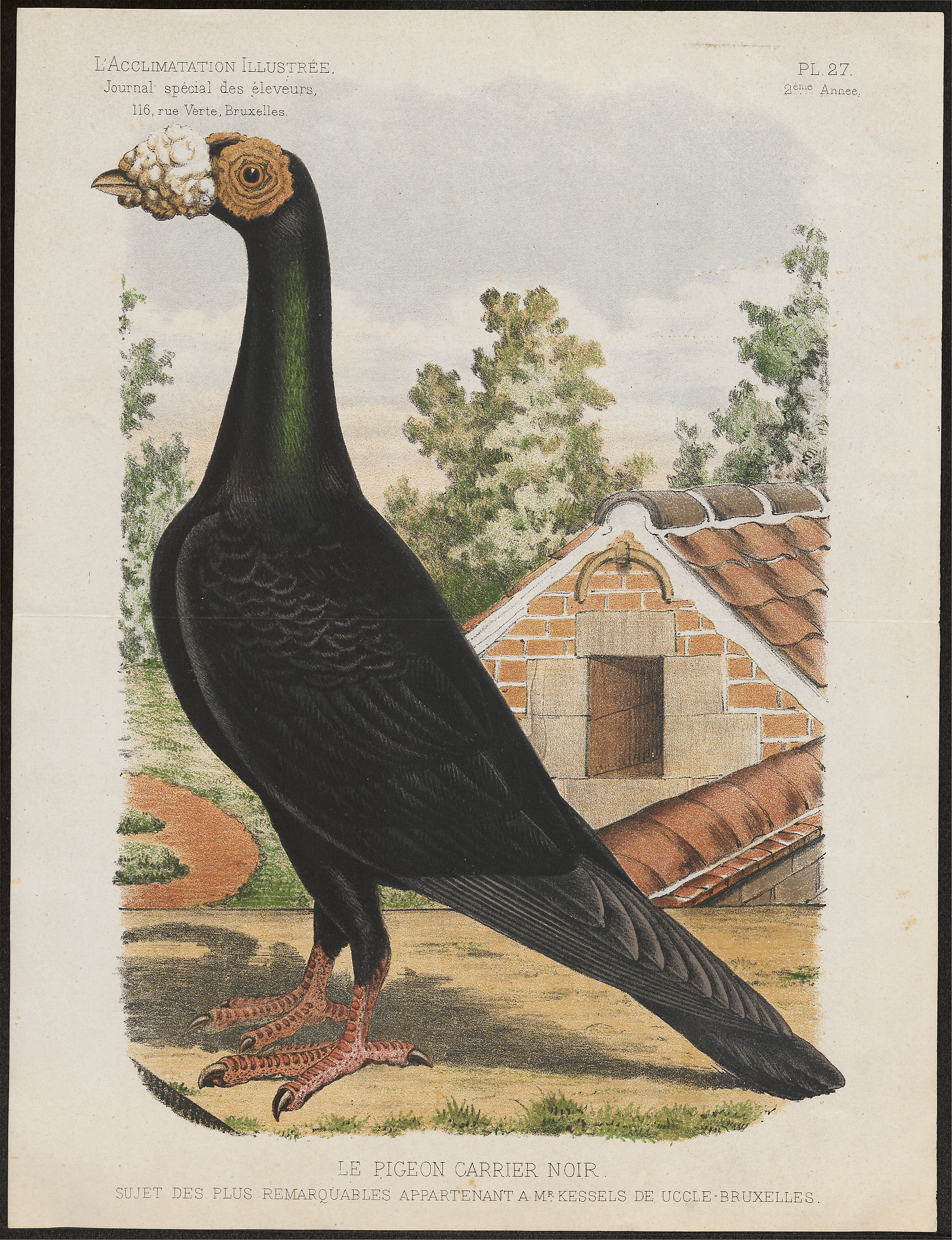
Black Carrier

== See also ==
- Pigeon Diet
- Pigeon Housing
- Homing pigeon
- List of pigeon breeds
