= Red Wattle Hog =

Breed of pig

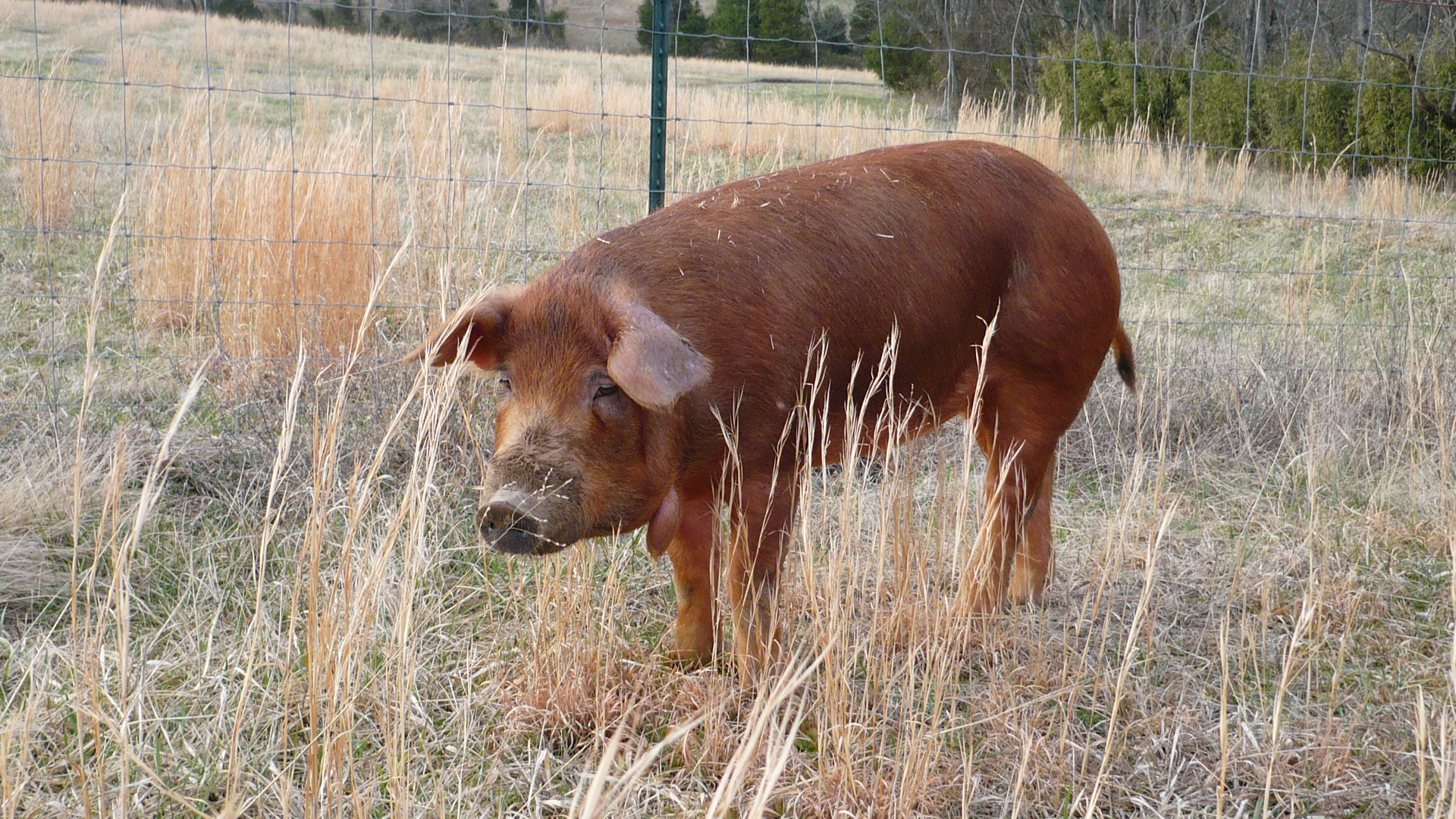
- Conservation status: Threatened
- Other names: Red Wattle pig
- Country of origin: United States
- Standard: Red Wattle Hog Association

Traits
- Weight: Male: 750 lb (340 kg); Female: 550 lb (249 kg)
- Hair: various shades of red, sometimes almost black

The Red Wattle Hog is a breed of domestic pig originating in the United States. It is named for its red color and distinctive wattles or tassels, and is on the threatened list of the American Livestock Breeds Conservancy (ALBC).

== Characteristics ==
The pigs are characterized by their red coat and distinctive wattles. They typically weigh 800–1,000 lb (360–450 kg). Large specimens can reach 1,200 lb (540 kg) in weight, 4 ft (120 cm) in height and 8 ft (240 cm) in length. They normally have 7 to 12 piglets per litter. They grow fast, forage well, and are hardy, mild-tempered, and resistant to disease. They are suitable for extensive management. Additionally, these hogs are known for their mothering ability, as well as producing high-quality marbled and tender meat.

== History ==
The early history of the Red Wattle Hog is not clear. The modern breed descends from animals found in East Texas in the late 1960s and early 1970s by H. C. Wengler, who cross-bred two wattled red sows with a Duroc boar to start the "Wengler Red Waddle" line. Other animals were found, also in East Texas, about 20 years later by Robert Prentice, and became the Timberline line of Red Wattles. Prentice also crossed his Timberlines with Wengler's line to make the Endow Farm Wattle Hogs. In the 1980s, three breed registries were maintained, but with no central breed association. In 1999, the American Livestock Breeds Conservancy found only 42 breeding animals belonging to six breeders. A Red Wattle Hog Association was started, which since September 2012 has maintained the pedigree book for the breed. The Red Wattle hog is listed by Slow Food USA in the Ark of Taste.

In 2012, Reggie, a Red Wattle Hog, set the record at the Iowa State Fair. "He posted a new Iowa State Fair record weighing in at 1,335 pounds."
