= Lithuanian White =

Lithuanian breed of pig

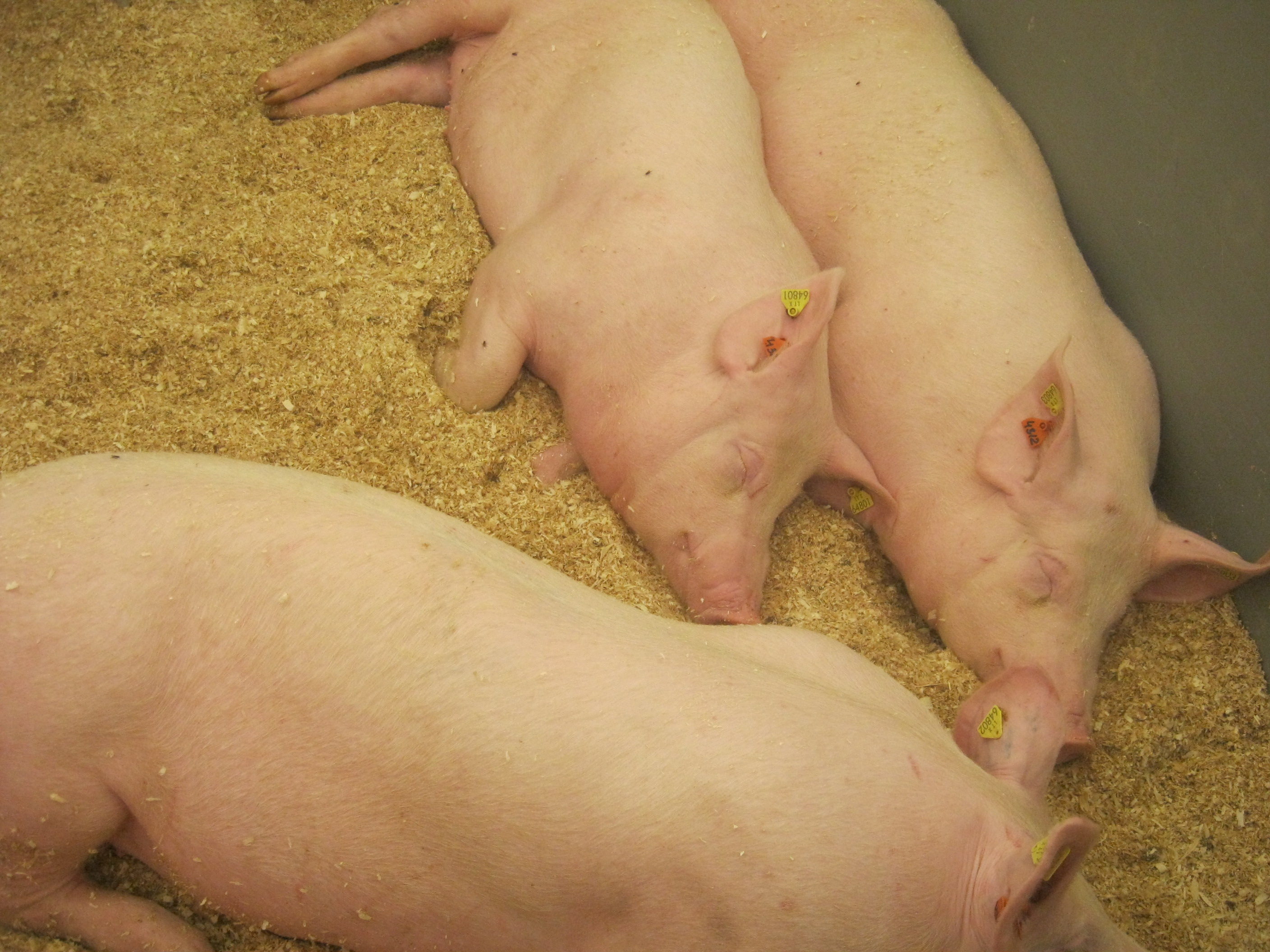
- Conservation status: FAO (2007): not at risk; DAD-IS (2021, Lithuania): critical; DAD-IS (2021, Russia): unknown
- Other names: Lithuanian: Lietuvos Baltoji; Russian: Litovskaya Belaya
- Country of origin: Lithuania
- Distribution: Lithuania; Russian Federation

Traits
- Weight: Male: 310 kg; Female: 210 kg
- Height: Male: 86 cm; Female: 79 cm

The Lithuanian White (Lithuanian: Lietuvos Baltoji) is a Lithuanian breed of general-purpose pig. It was developed in the twentieth century in the Lithuanian Soviet Socialist Republic under the Lithuanian Animal Husbandry Research Institute of Baisogala, and was officially recognised in 1967. It derives from cross-breeding of local pigs with imported breeds including the Large White, the Deutsches Edelschwein and the German Landrace. It was bred for suitability to conditions in Lithuania, but spread to other parts of the Soviet Union including those that are now Belarus, Georgia, Kazakhstan, Turkmenistan and Moldova, and was also reared in parts of the Russian Republic.

In 1980 the breed numbered over a million head. In 2020 a total of 353 animals was reported to DAD-IS by Lithuania; its conservation status there is reported as "critical". The Russian Federation last reported numbers in 2003, when there were 18 200 head; conservation status there is unknown.
