= Wattle (anatomy) =

Fleshy growth on the head or neck of a bird

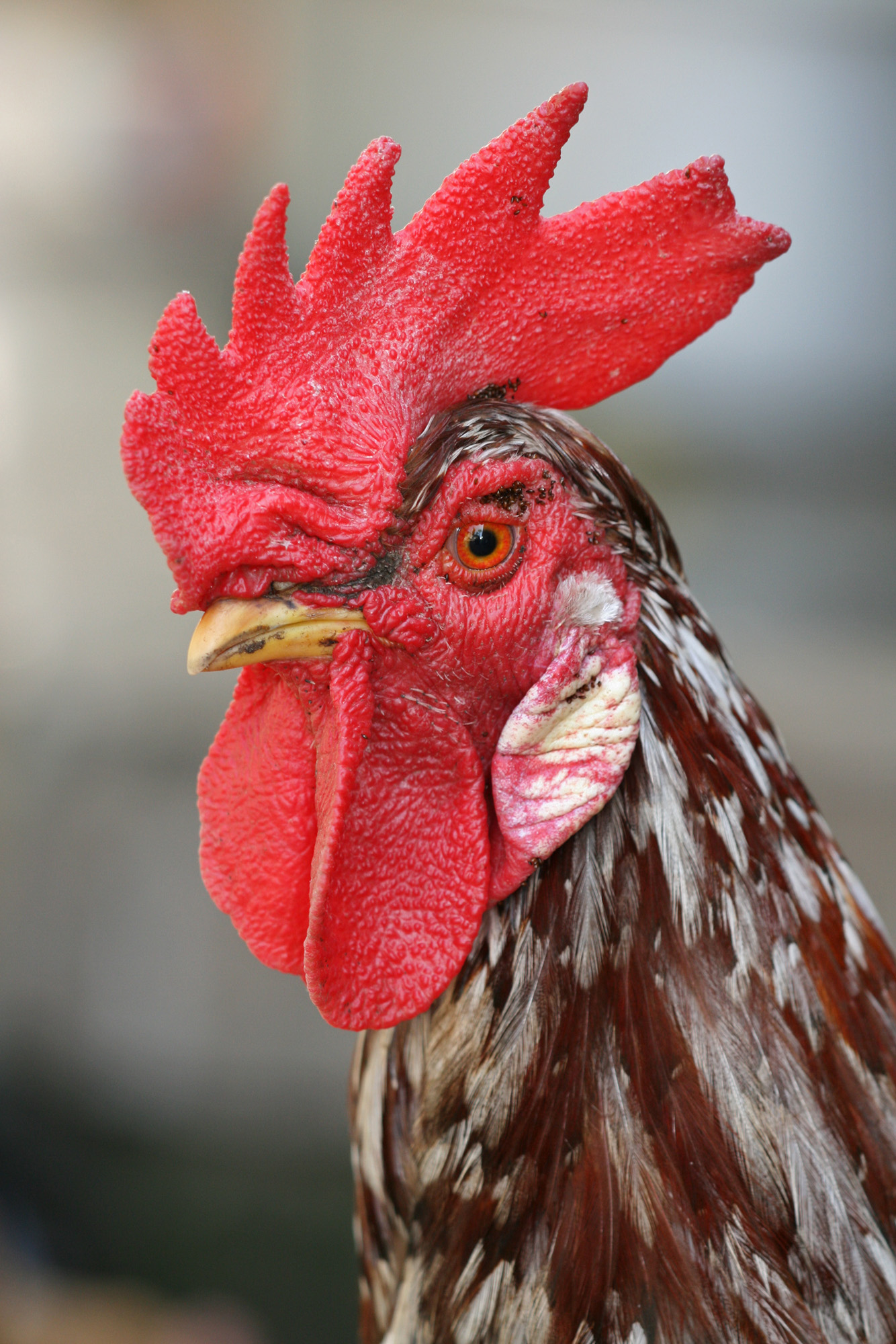
A rooster's wattles hang from the throat

A wattle is a fleshy caruncle hanging from various parts of the head or neck in several groups of birds and mammals. Caruncles in birds include those found on the face, wattles, dewlaps, snoods, and earlobes. Wattles are generally paired structures but may occur as a single structure when it is sometimes known as a dewlap. Wattles are frequently organs of sexual dimorphism. In some birds, caruncles are erectile tissue and may or may not have a feather covering.

Wattles are often such a striking morphological characteristic of animals that they feature in their common name. For example, the southern and northern cassowaries are known as the double-wattled and single-wattled cassowary, respectively, and a breed of domestic pig is known as the Red Wattle.

== Birds ==
=== Function ===
In birds, wattles are often an ornament for courting potential mates. Large wattles are correlated with high testosterone levels, good nutrition, and the ability to evade predators, which in turn indicates a potentially successful mate. Ornamental organs such as wattles may be associated with genes coding for disease resistance. In umbrellabirds, the wattle serves to amplify the birds' calls.

=== Examples ===
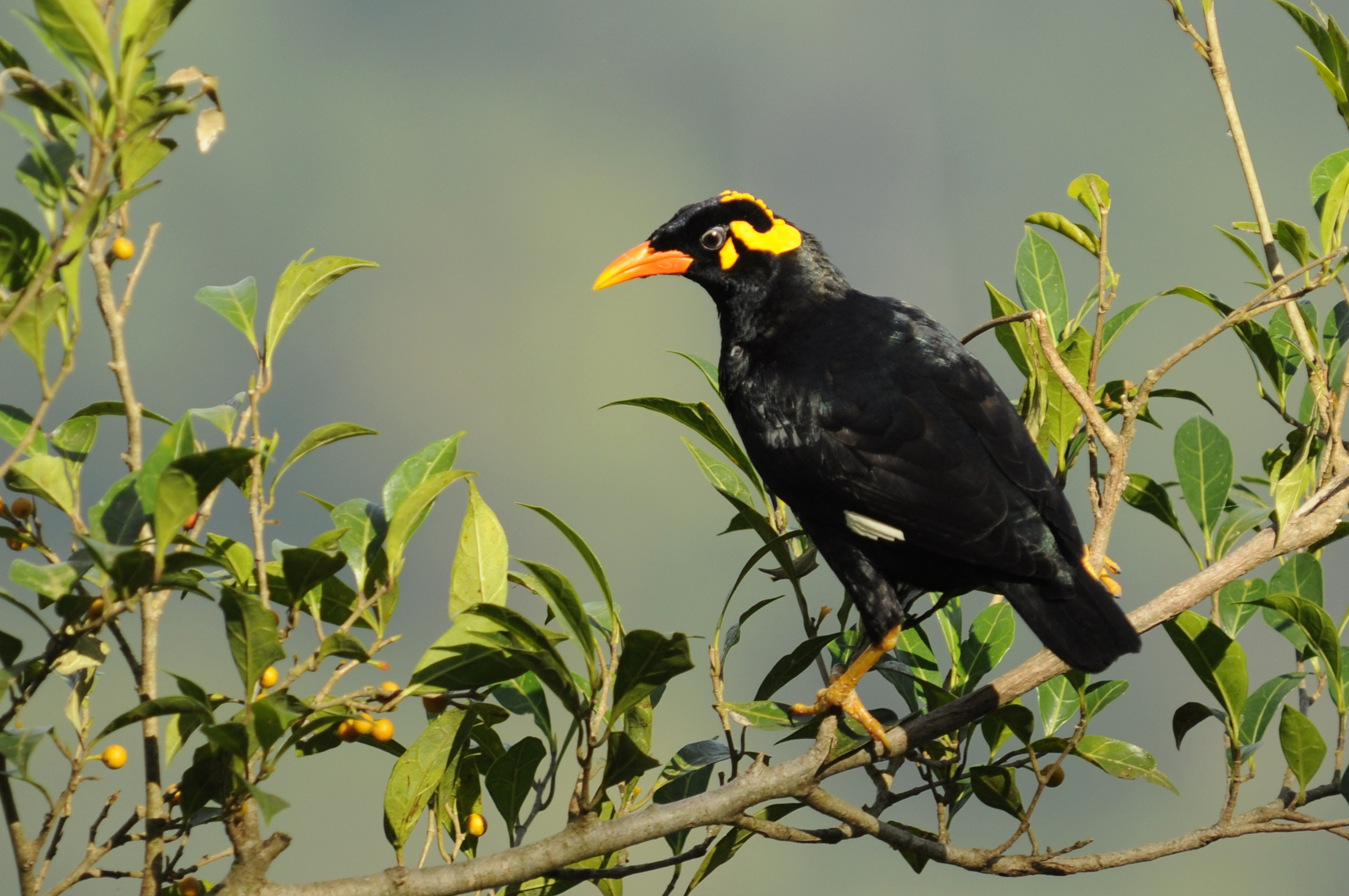
Southern hill myna in southern India shows yellow wattles on the head

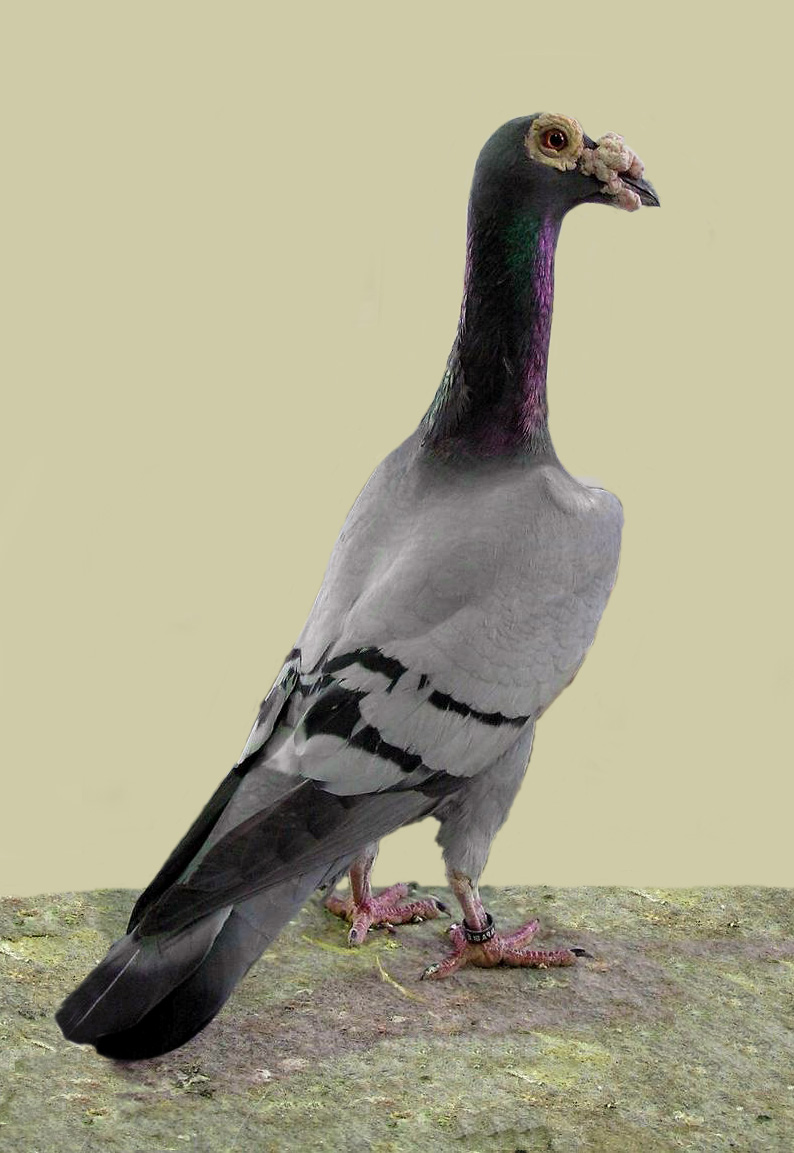
An English carrier pigeon with pale wattles around the eyes and beak

Birds with wattles include:

- From the neck or throat
  - Birds of the genus Casuarius: the northern, southern, and dwarf cassowaries
  - Galliformes (e.g., wild turkeys, chickens)
  - Some vultures
  - Some lapwings
  - The male of the wattled starling
  - Some Australian wattlebirds (Anthochaera spp.)
  - The New Zealand wattlebirds (Callaeidae), which include the kōkako, tīeke or saddleback, and the huia
  - The wattled crane (Bugeranus carunculatus)
  - Three neotropical bellbird species
- From below or around the eyes
  - The African wattle-eye or puffback flycatcher
  - The wattled jacana (Jacana jacana)
  - The African wattled lapwing (Vanellus senegallus)
  - Many male pheasants
  - Spectacled tyrant
  - Gracula hill mynas
  - Muscovy duck (Cairina moschata)
  - The English carrier pigeon

== Mammals ==
Mammals with wattles include:

- Some domestic goats have fleshy, fur-covered protuberances, called tassels, hanging on either side of the throat.
- Some domestic pigs, such as the Kunekune, Lithuanian Native pig, and Red Wattle have a fleshy protuberance hanging on either side of the throat.

== Gallery ==
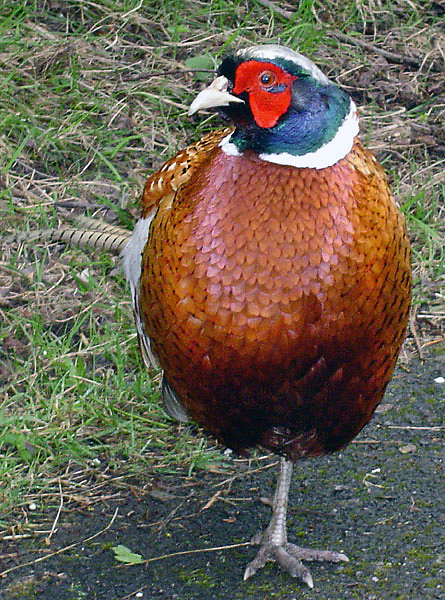
A common pheasant (Phasianus colchicus) cock bird with bright red facial wattles

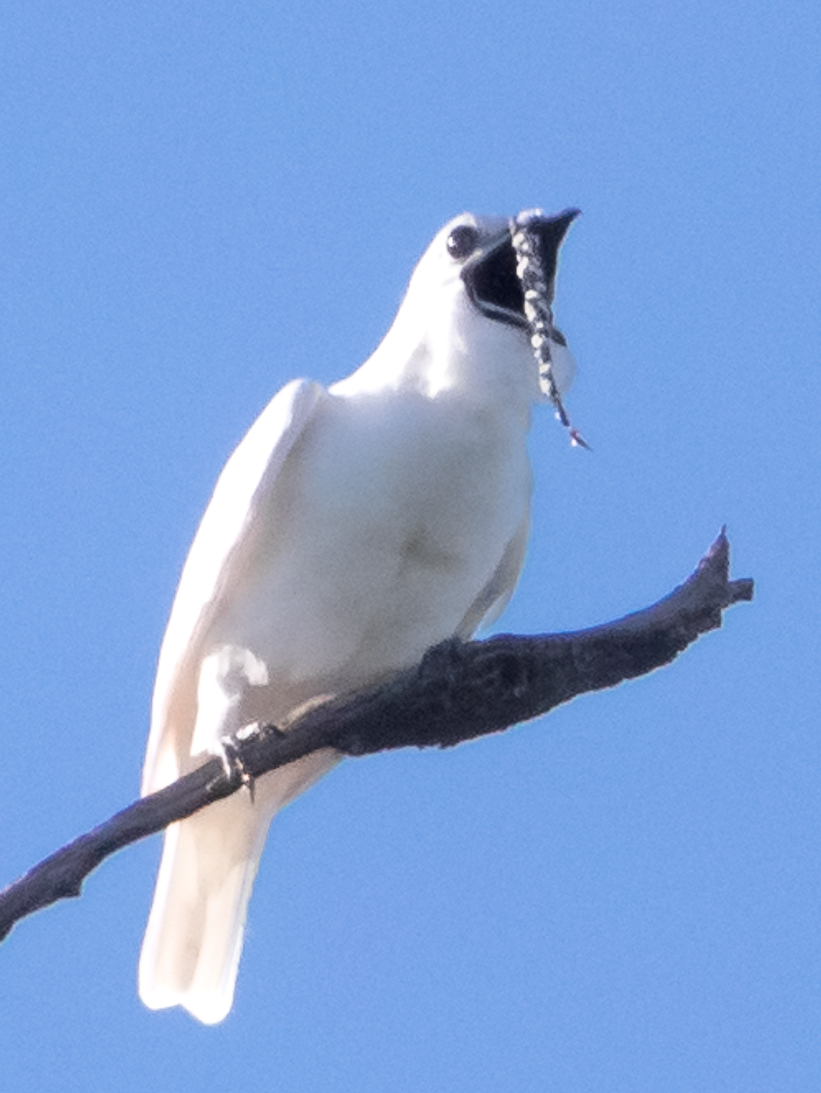
A male white bellbird (Procnias albus) with a long wattle hanging from the upper bill

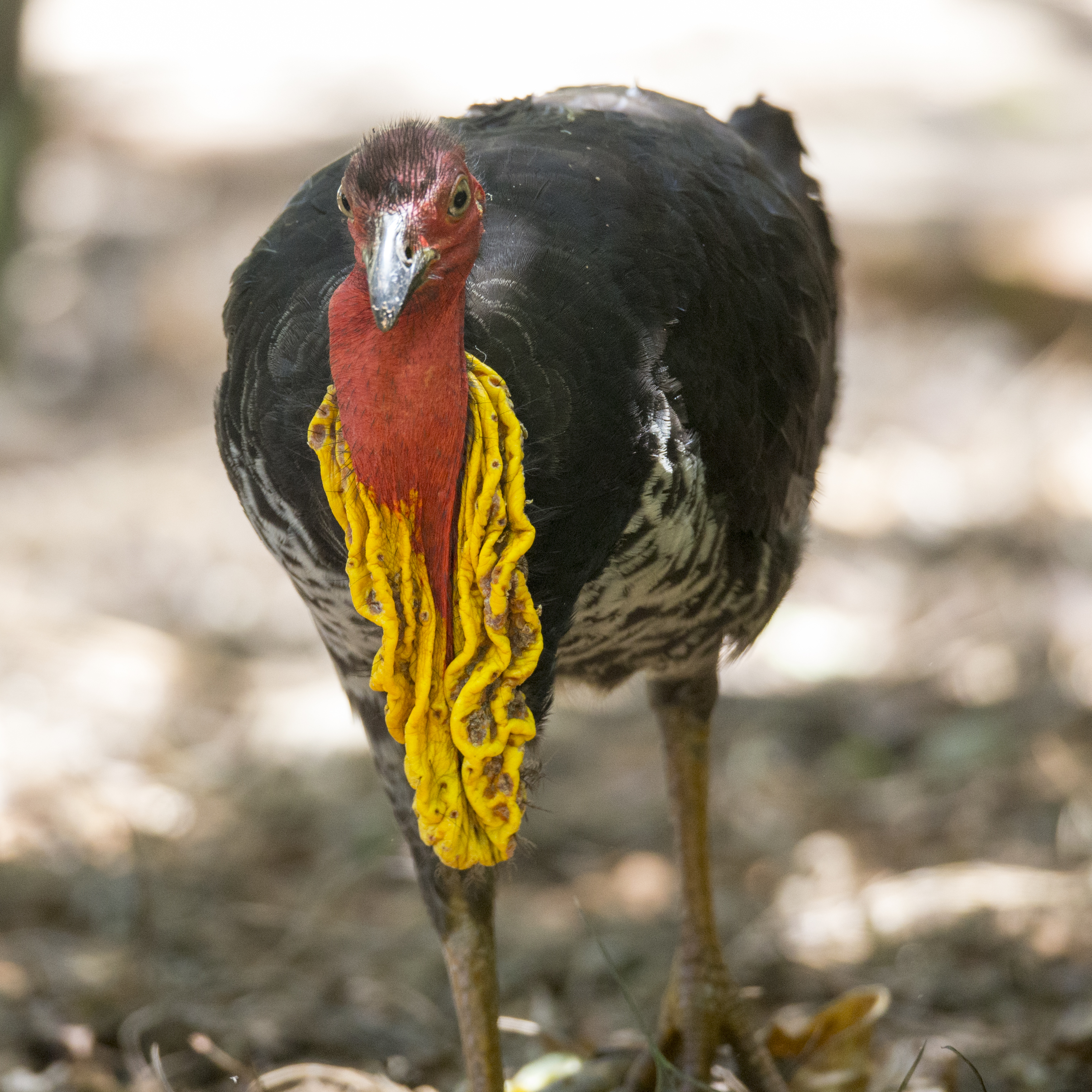
A male Australian brushturkey (Alectura lathami) with a large yellow throat wattle

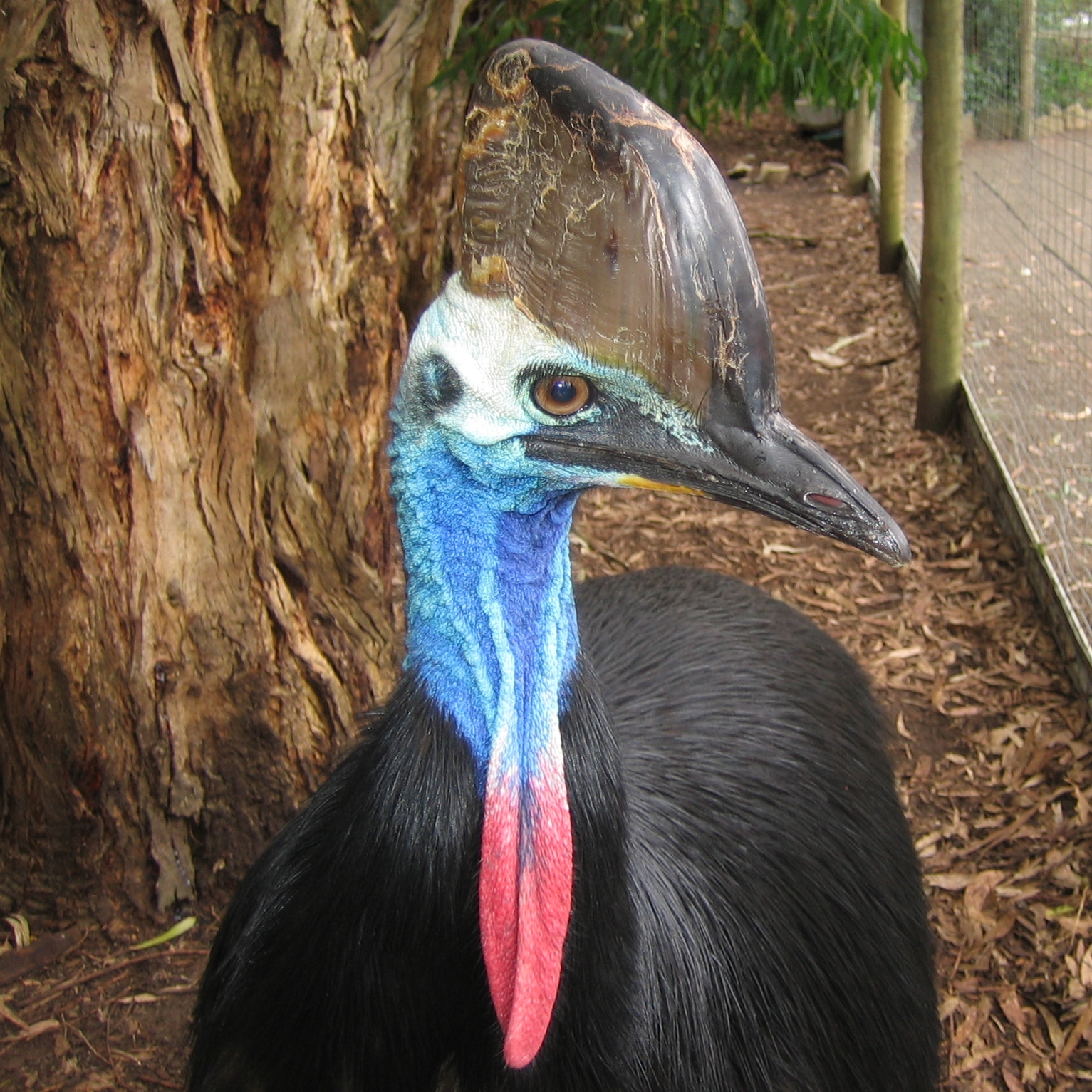
A southern cassowary (Casuarius casuarius) with double wattles hanging from the throat

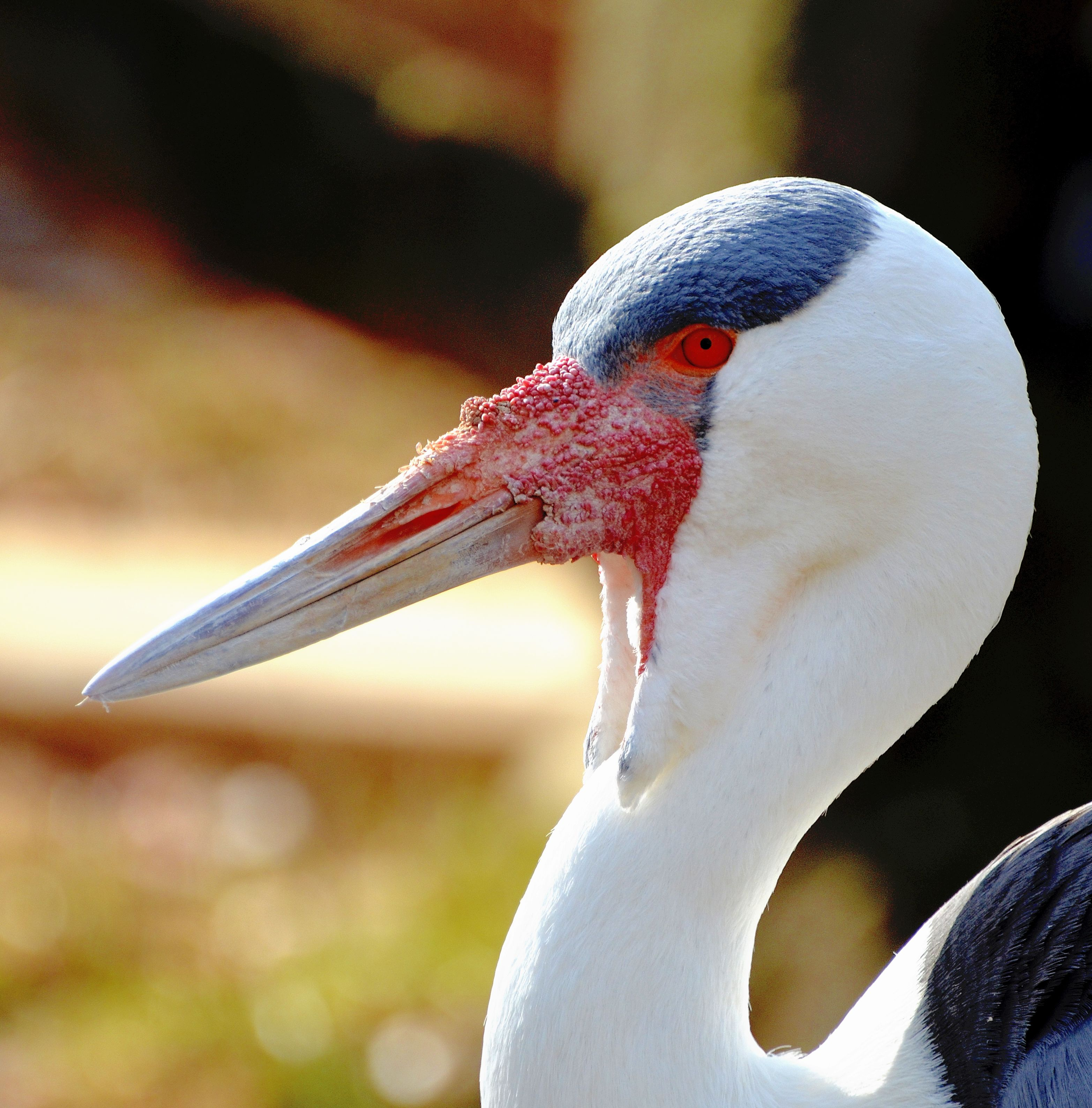
A wattled crane (Grus carunculatus) with wattles hanging from its throat

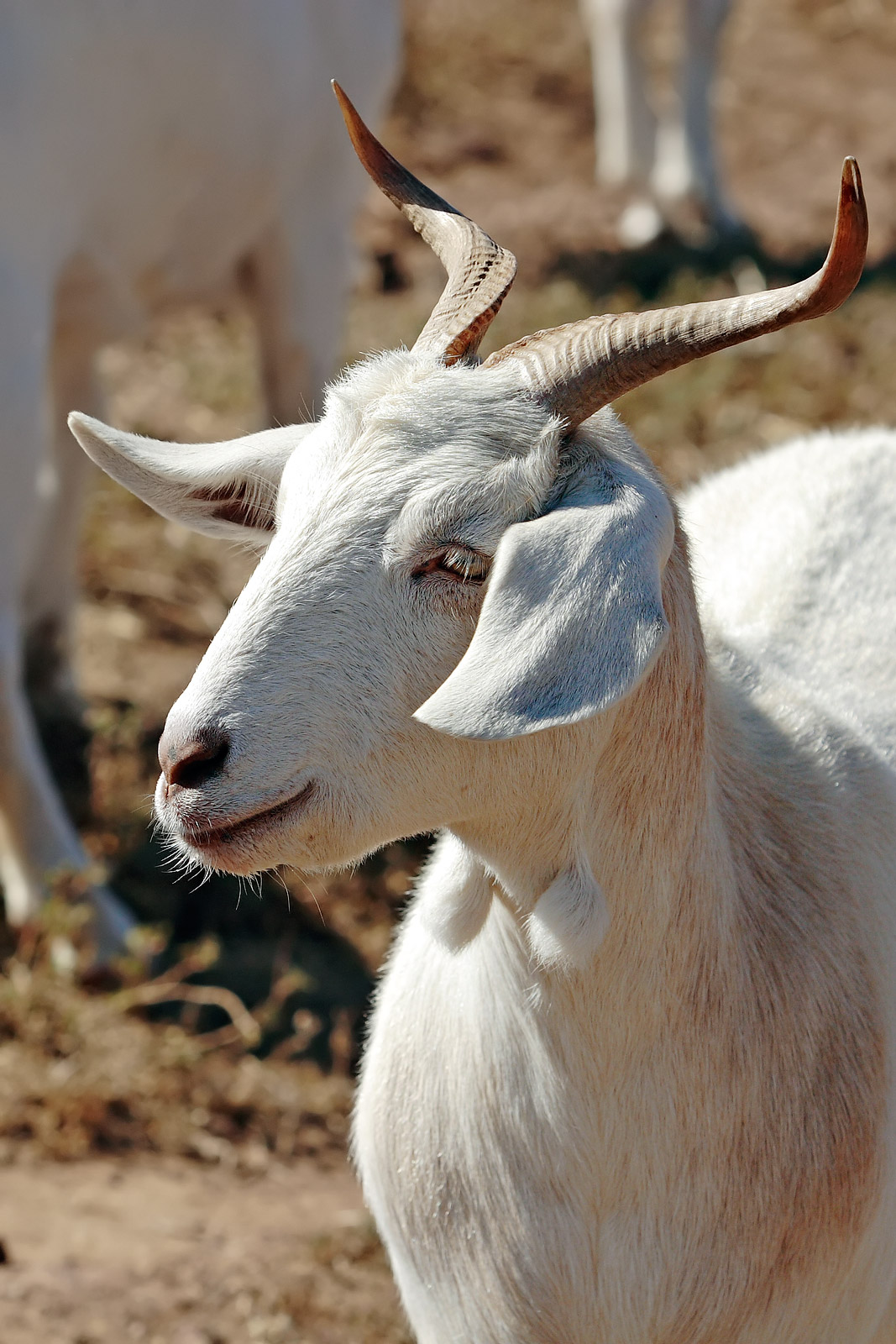
A goat (Capra hircus) with small wattles at the base of its throat

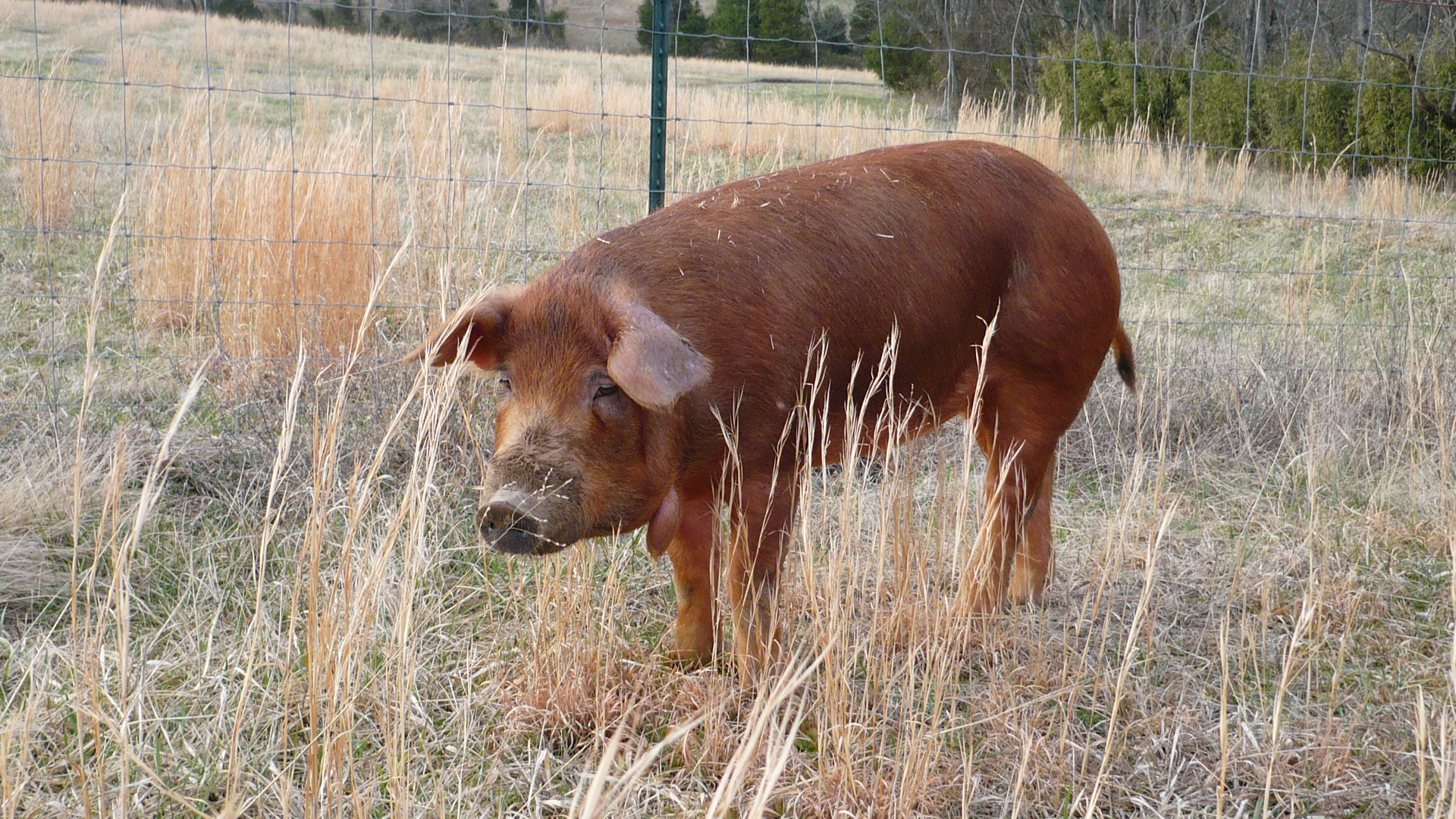
Red Wattle pig with wattles at the base of the throat

== See also ==
- Dewlap
- Casque (anatomy)
- Crest (feathers)
- Comb (anatomy) - the fleshy structure present atop the heads of many Galliform species
- Frontal shield
- Gular pouch
- Dubbing (poultry) - wattle amputation
