= List of dried foods =

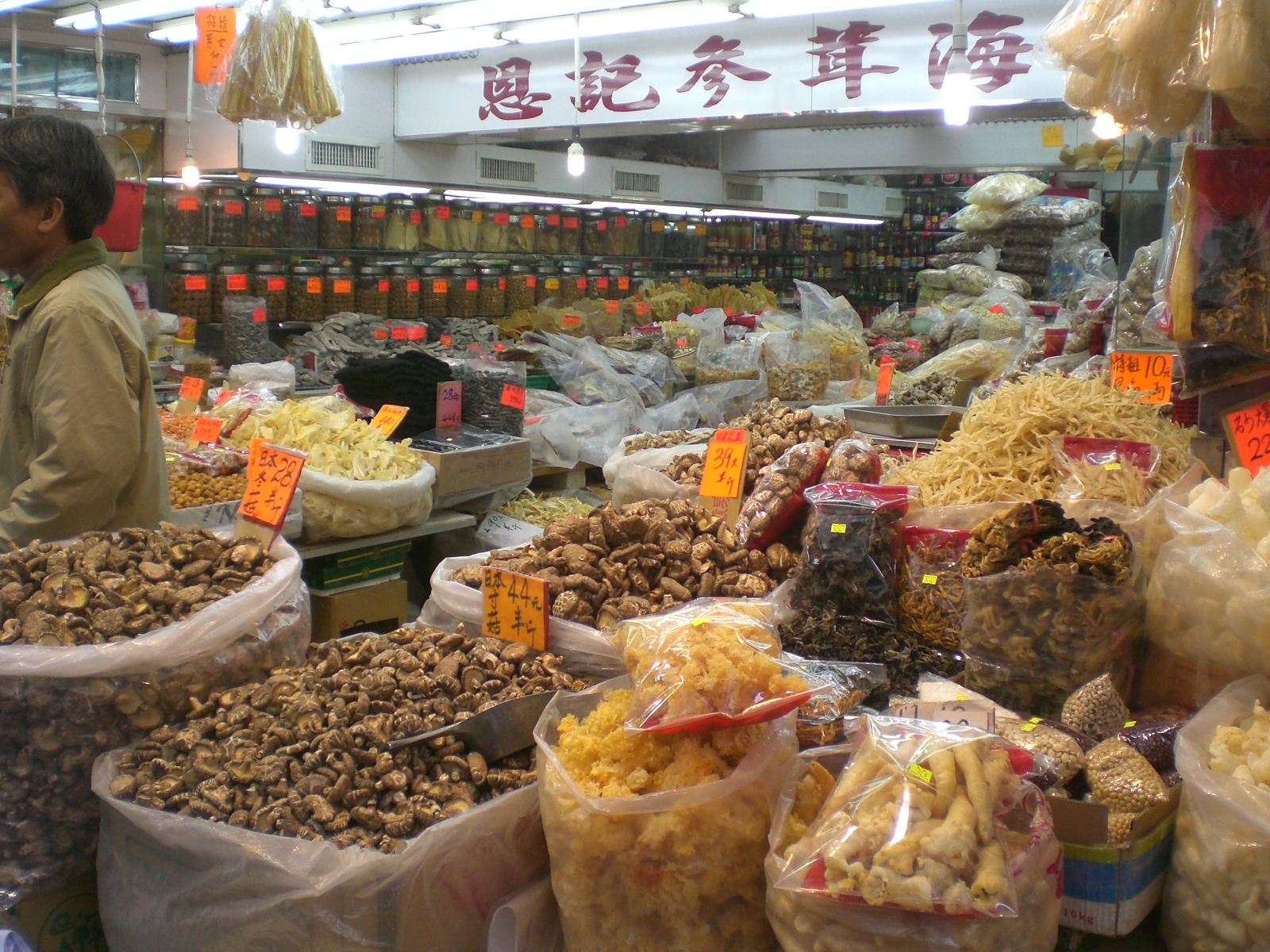
Various dried foods in a dried foods store

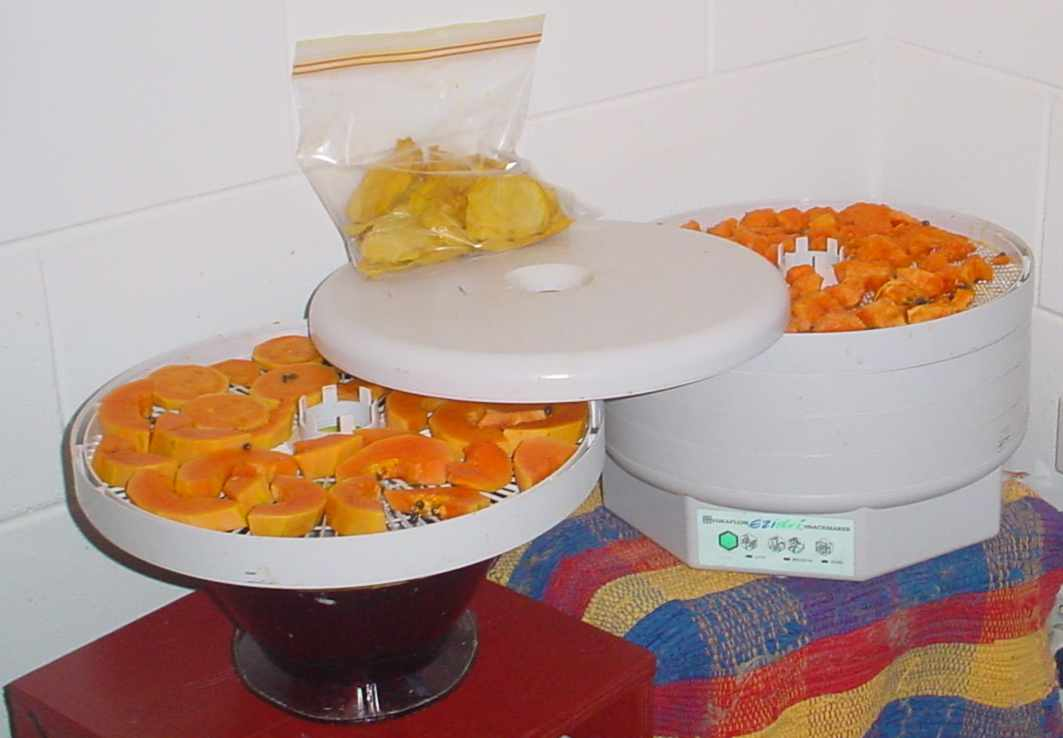
An electric food dehydrator with mango and papaya slices being dried

This is a list of dried foods. Food drying is a method of food preservation that works by removing water from the food, which inhibits the growth of bacteria and has been practiced worldwide since ancient times to preserve food. Where or when dehydration as a food preservation technique was invented has been lost to time, but the earliest known practice of food drying is 12000 BC by inhabitants of the modern Middle East and Asia.

== Dried foods ==
=== Processed foods ===
==== B ====
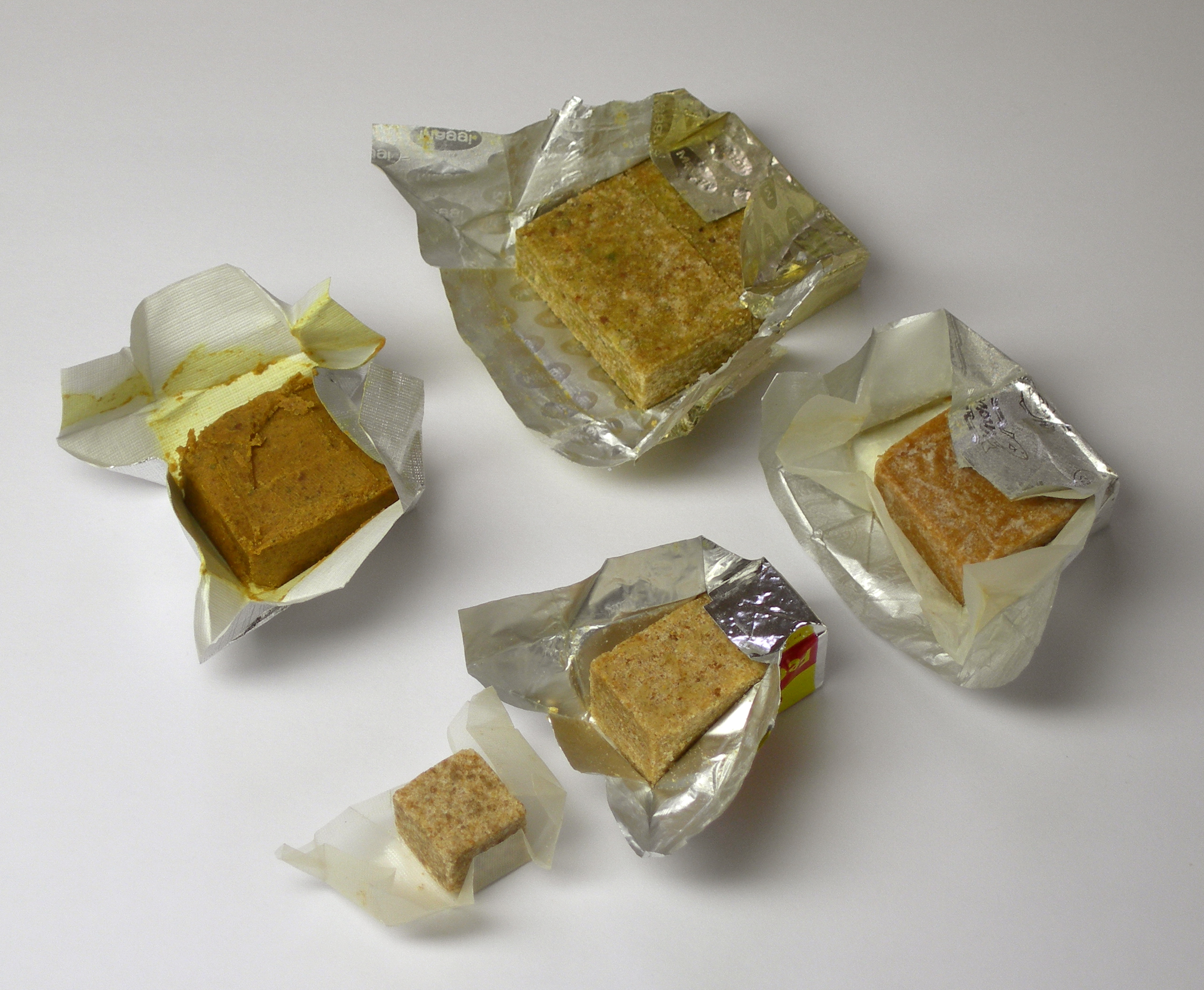
Various bouillon cubes

- Baker's yeast – used as a leavening agent in baked foods such as breads, cakes, and pies.
- Bouillon cubes – are dehydrated bouillon (French for broth) or stock formed into small cubes about 15 mm per side. They are typically made by dehydrating vegetables, meat stock, a small portion of fat, salt, and seasonings, and shaping the resulting solids into small cubes. Vegetarian and vegan types are also made.
- Instant breakfast – typically refers to breakfast food products manufactured in a powdered form, which are generally prepared with the addition of milk and then consumed as a beverage. An example is Carnation Instant Breakfast, introduced in 1964.

==== C ====
- Instant coffee – is a beverage derived from brewed coffee beans. Instant coffee is commercially prepared by either freeze-drying or spray drying, after which it can be rehydrated. Instant coffee in a concentrated liquid form is also manufactured.

==== E ====
- Powdered eggs – are fully dehydrated eggs made using spray drying in the same way that powdered milk is made. Powdered eggs have a storage life of 5 to 10 years when stored without oxygen in a cool environment. Another dried egg product is freeze-dried eggs, which can be shelf-stable for up to 25 years.

==== I ====
- Freeze-dried ice cream – is ice cream that has had most of the water removed from it by a freeze-drying process; sealed in a pouch, it requires no refrigeration. It achieved fame as a food in human spaceflight.
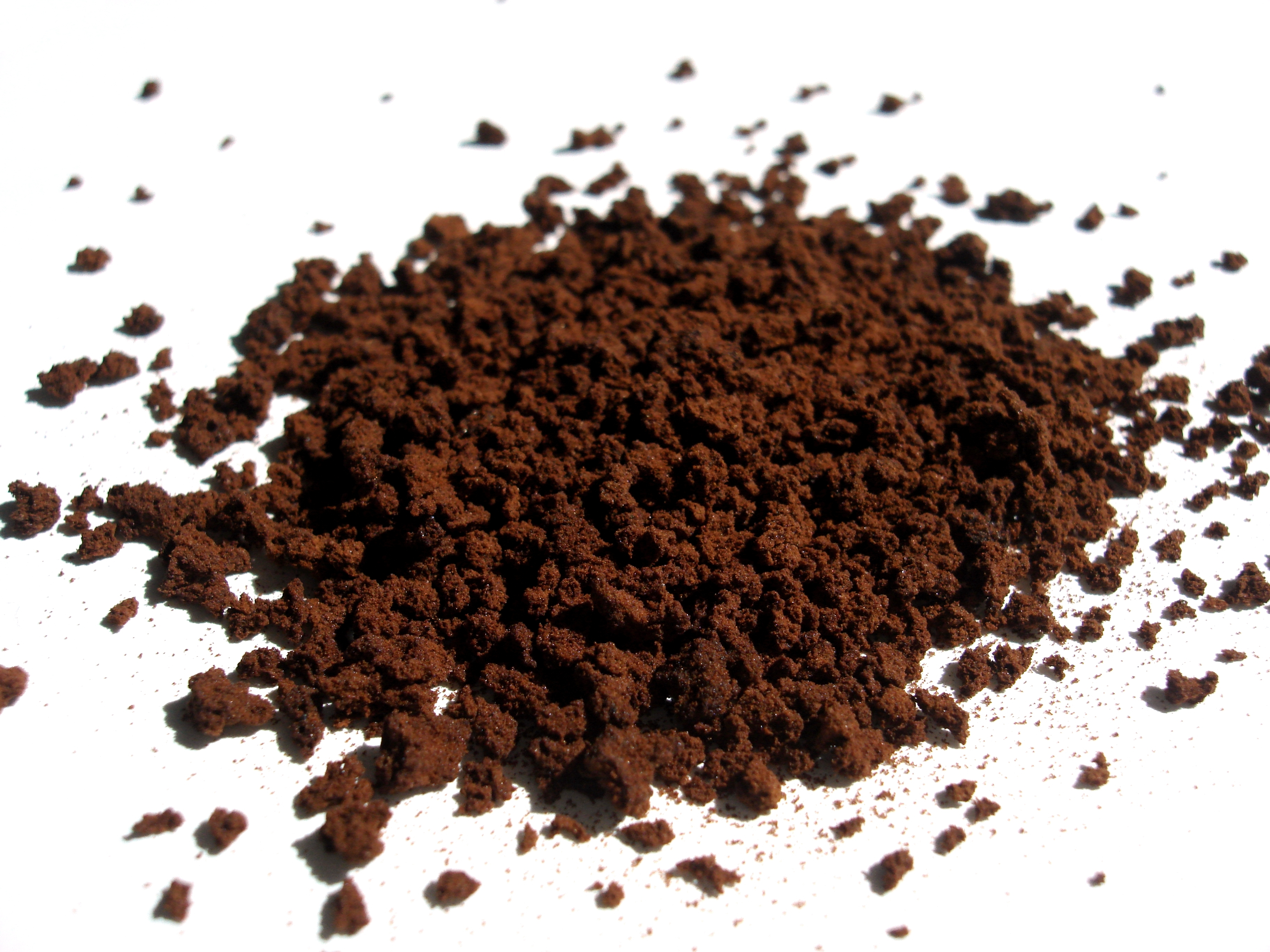
Instant coffee

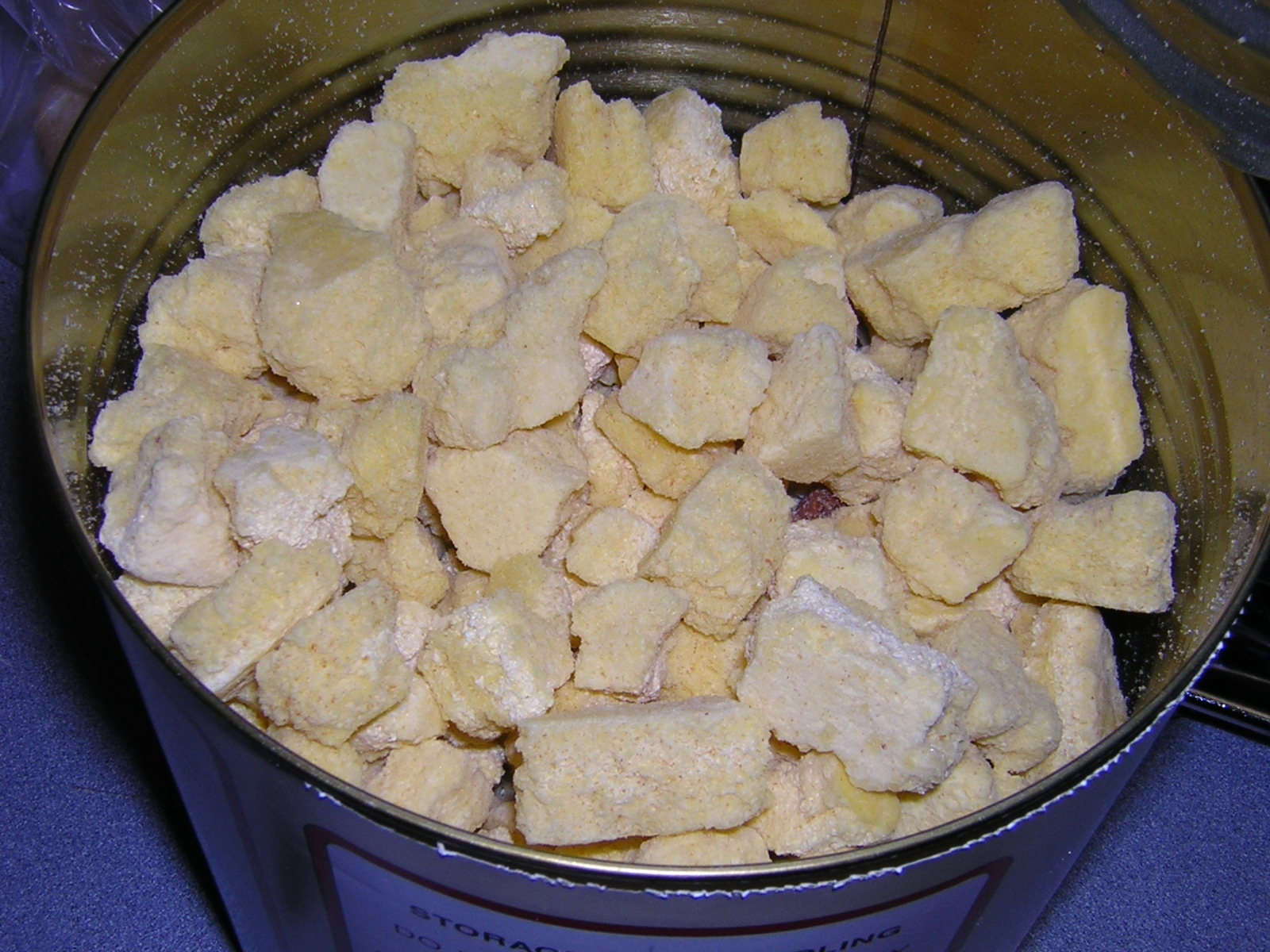
Freeze-dried eggs can be shelf-stable for up to 25 years.

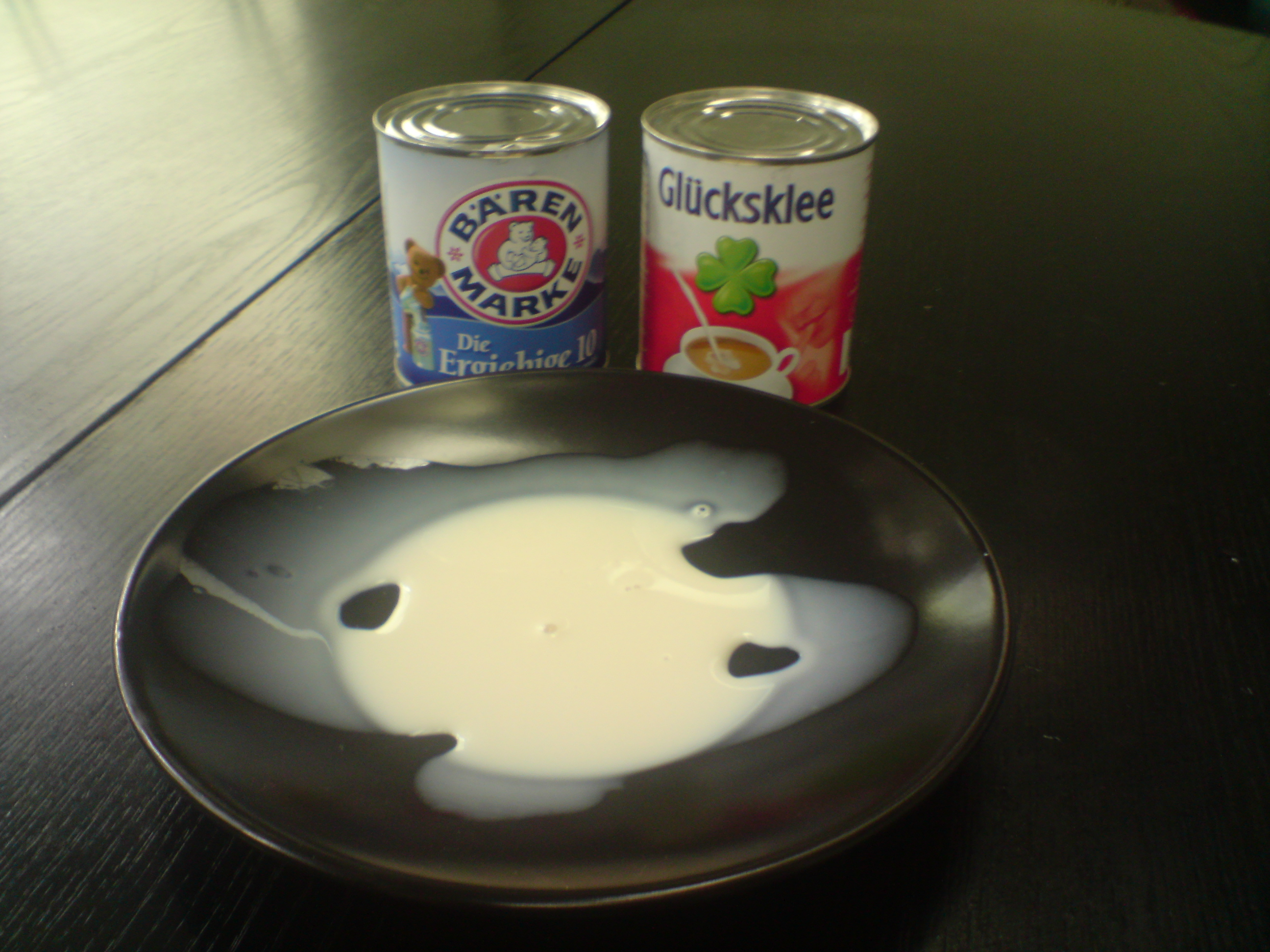
Evaporated milk

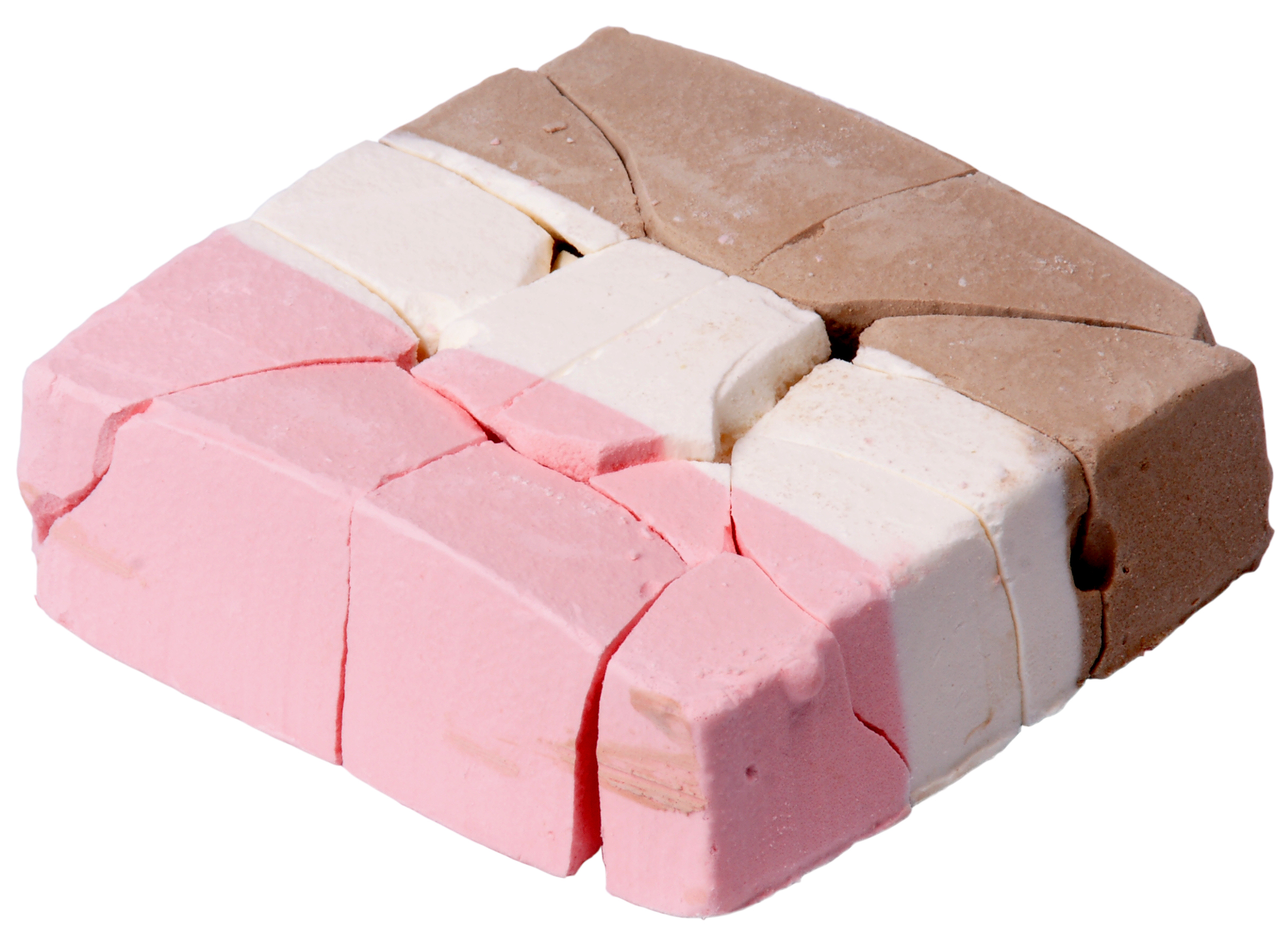
Freeze-dried ice cream, Neapolitan flavor

==== J ====
- Edible jellyfish – is often salt-cured, creating a dried finished product.

==== K ====
- Kashk – is used in a large family of foods found in Lebanese, Palestinian, Egyptian, Kurdish, Iranian, and Central Asian cuisine. It is made from drained sour milk or yogurt by forming it and letting it dry. It can be made in a variety of forms, including rolled into balls, sliced into strips, and formed into chunks.

==== M ====
- Evaporated milk – is a shelf-stable canned milk product with about 60% of the water removed. It differs from sweetened condensed milk, which contains added sugar.
- Powdered milk – is a manufactured dairy product made by evaporating milk to dryness. In modern times, powdered milk is usually made by spray drying nonfat skimmed milk, whole milk, buttermilk, or whey. Pasteurized milk is first concentrated in an evaporator to around 50% milk solids. The resulting concentrated milk is then sprayed into a heated chamber where the water almost instantly evaporates, leaving fine particles of powdered milk solids.

==== N ====
- Non-dairy creamer – is a liquid or granular substance intended to substitute for milk or cream as an additive to coffee or other beverages.
- Instant noodles – are dried, cooked noodles usually sold with packets of flavoring powder and/or seasoning oil. Instant ramen is a very common type of instant noodle product.
- Nutritional yeast – is sold in the form of flakes or as a yellow powder and is used as a food supplement.

==== O ====
- Instant oatmeal – is cooked oatmeal, dried, and reconstituted with hot water.
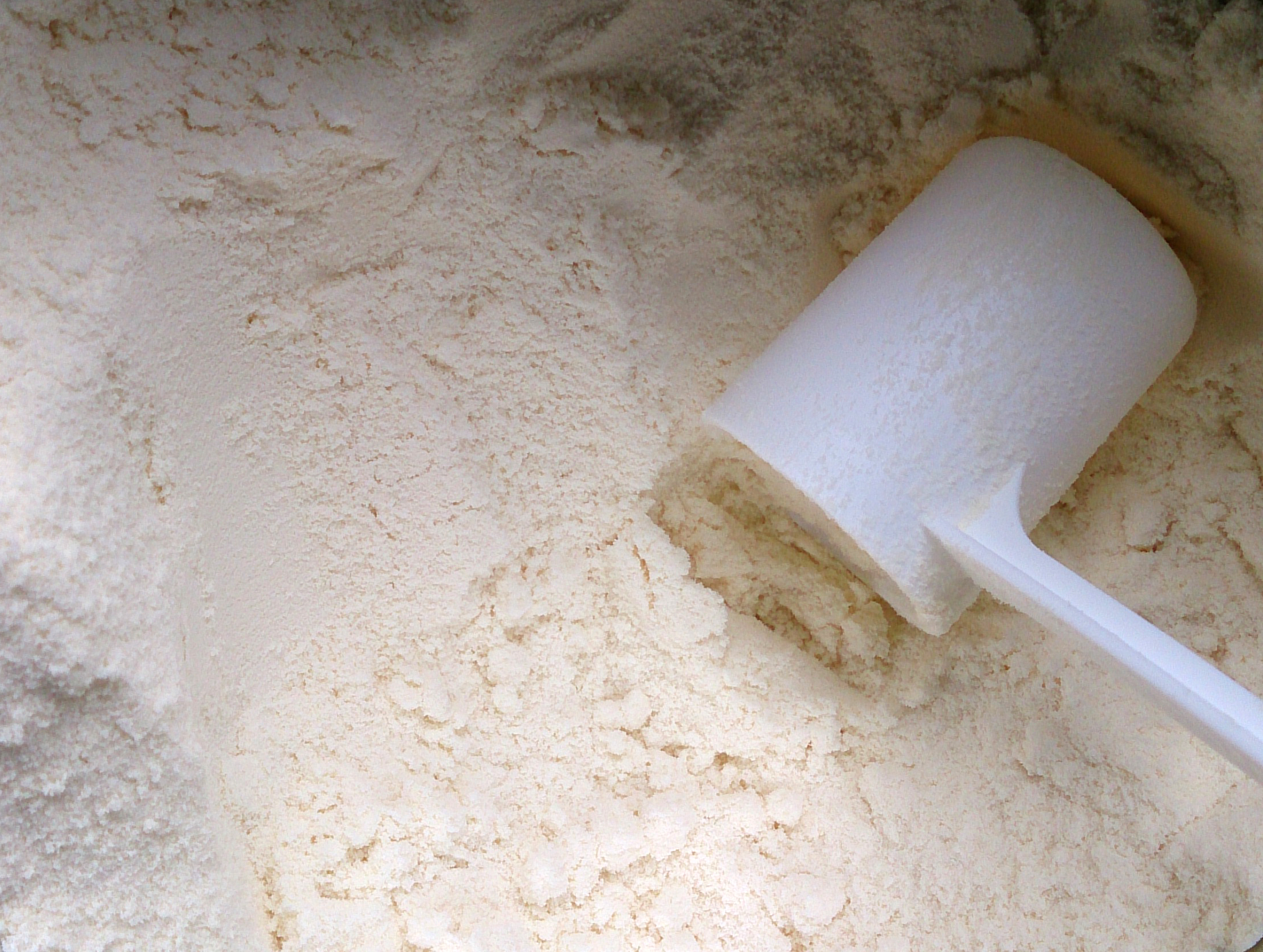
Powdered milk

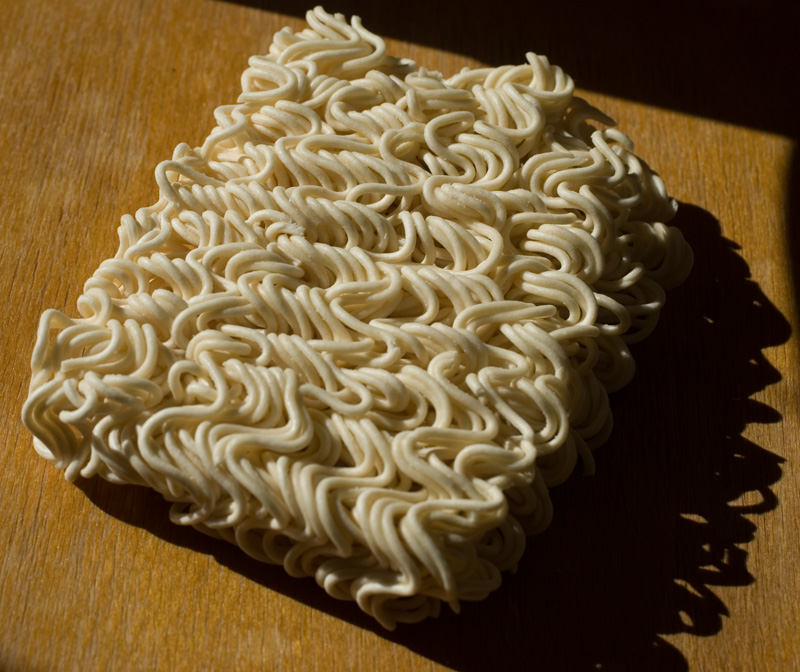
Instant ramen

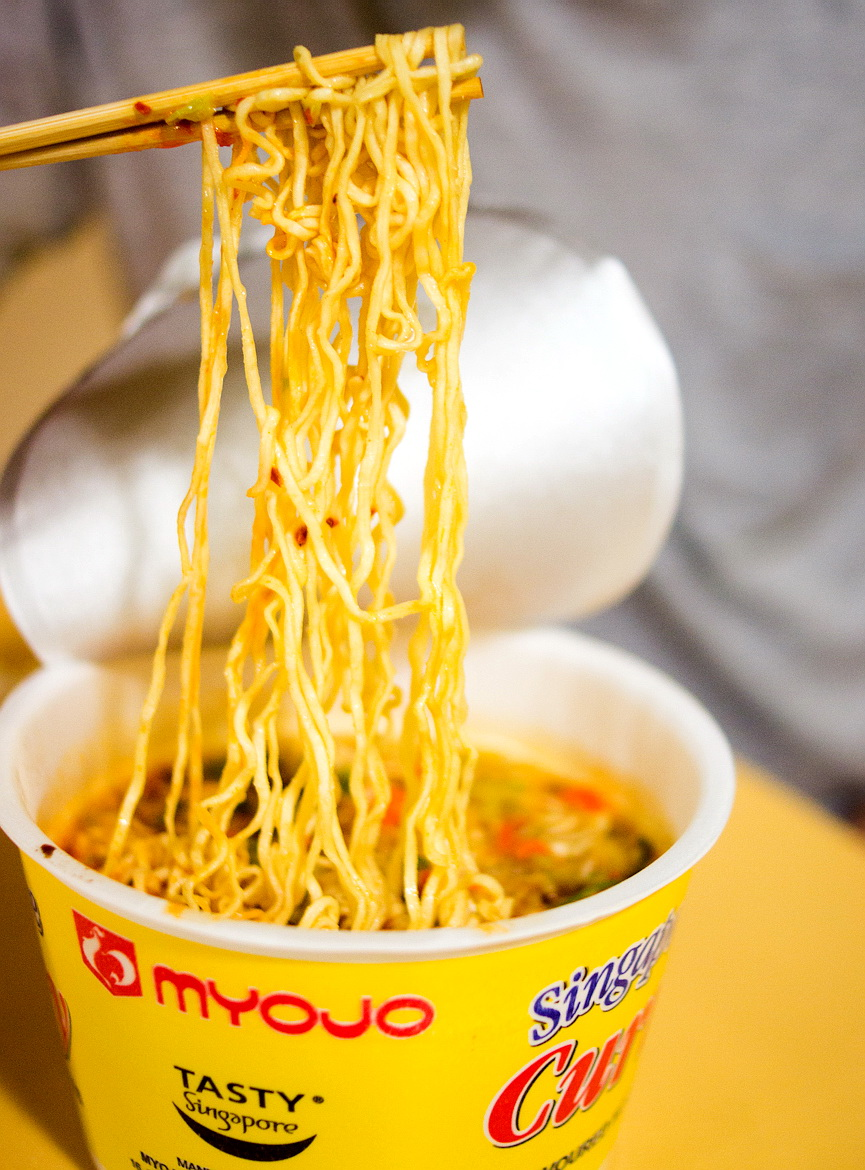
Reconstituted instant ramen noodles

==== S ====
- Snack bar or food bar – is a pressed cake of grains, nuts, and fruits that can take the place of meals. They are an important source of food energy for circumstances when preparing a meal is inconvenient.
- Instant soup – consists of a packet of dry soup stock that does not contain water, and are prepared by adding water and then heating the product for a short time, or by adding hot water directly to the dry soup mix.
- Portable soup – is a kind of dehydrated food used in the 18th and 19th centuries. It was a precursor of the later meat extract and bouillon cubes, and of industrially dehydrated food.

==== T ====
- Tarhana – is a Central Asian dried soup.
- Instant tea is a powdered mix in which water is added, in order to reconstitute it into a cup of tea.
- Tempeh – is soybeans pressed into a cake that undergoes fermentation. When dried it has a shelf life of several months.
- Terasi (trassi in Dutch) – Indonesian (especially Javanese cuisine) variant of dried shrimp paste usually pressed into dry blocks. It is also sometimes sold ground as a granulated powder.

== Plant foods ==
=== Dried fruit ===
Dried fruit is fruit from which the majority of the original water content has been removed, either naturally, through sun drying, or through the use of specialized dryers or dehydrators. Dried fruit has a long tradition of use dating back to the fourth millennium BC in Mesopotamia, and is prized because of its sweet taste, nutritive value, and long shelf life.

==== A ====
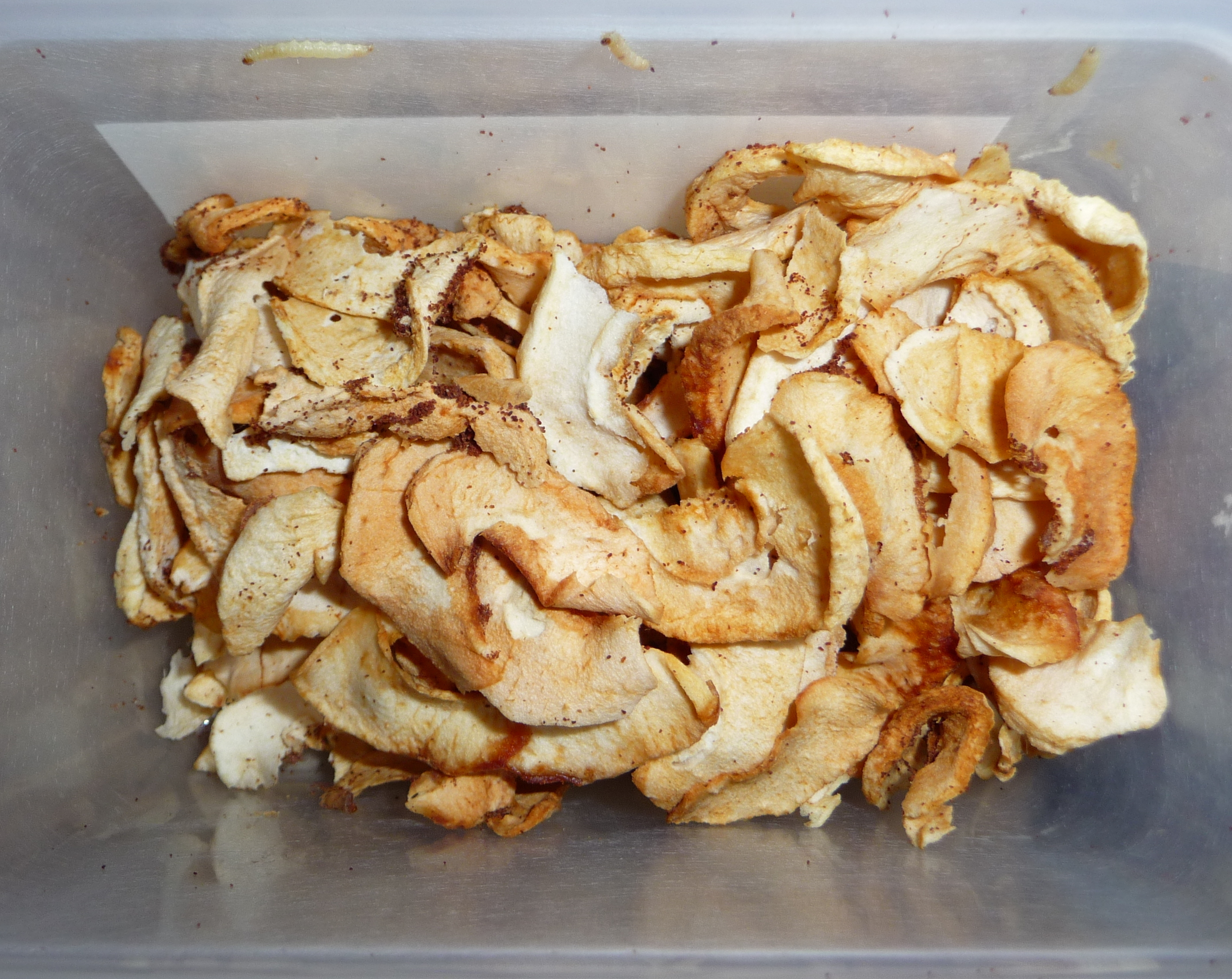
Dried apple

- Aam papad – a mango
- Ancho chili – the dried form of poblano chili.
- Apple chips
- Dried apple – can be eaten dried or reconstituted (soaked in water, alcohol or some other liquid) for later use.
- Dried apricot – can be dried either whole or in halves, with or without kernels.

==== B ====
- Banana chips – are dried or deep-fried slices of bananas commonly found in Brazil, Indonesia (as kripik) and India.
- Black lime – is a spice used in Middle Eastern dishes made by boiling fresh limes in salt water and sun-drying them until the insides turn black.
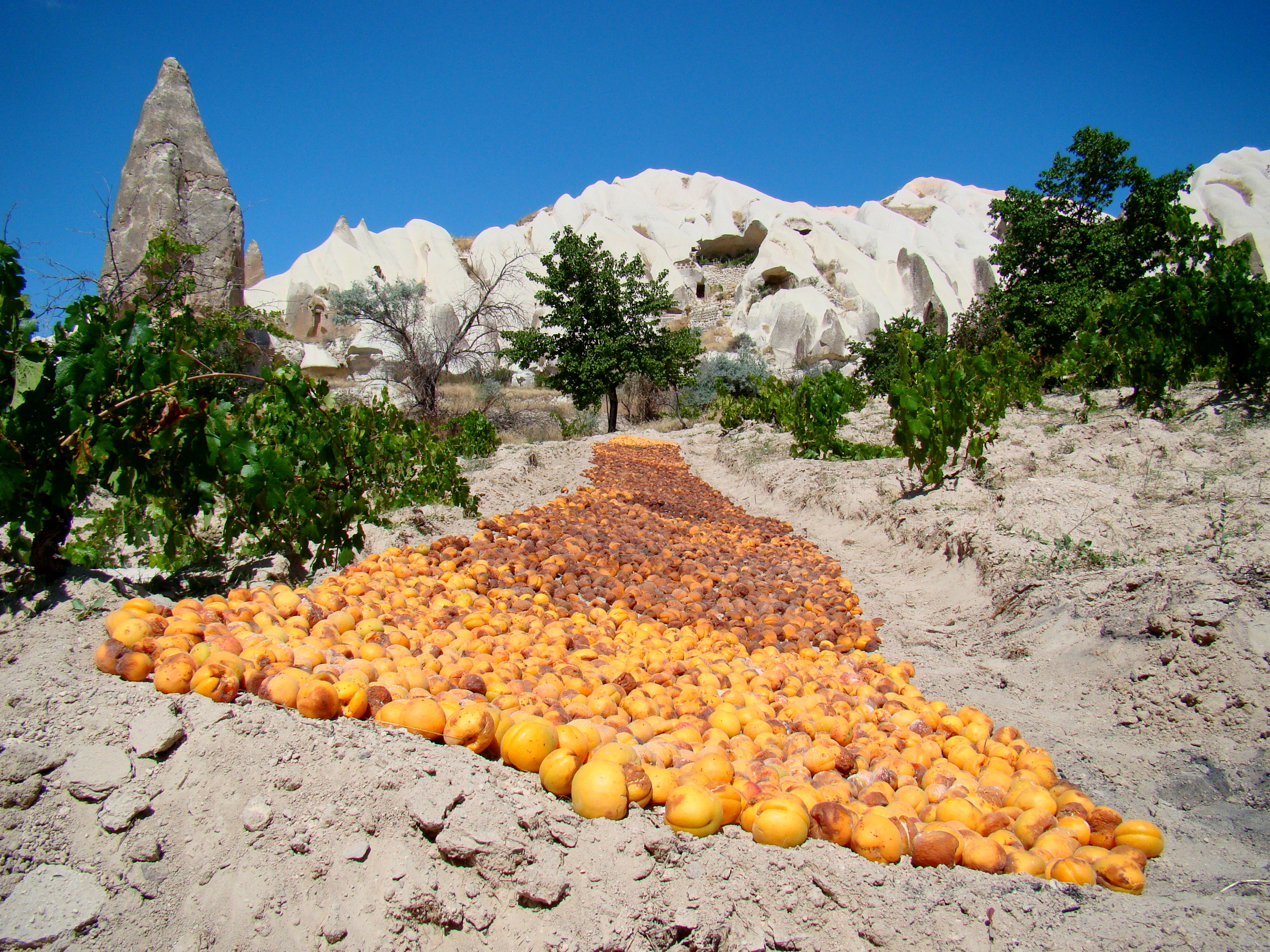
Apricots drying on the ground in Turkey

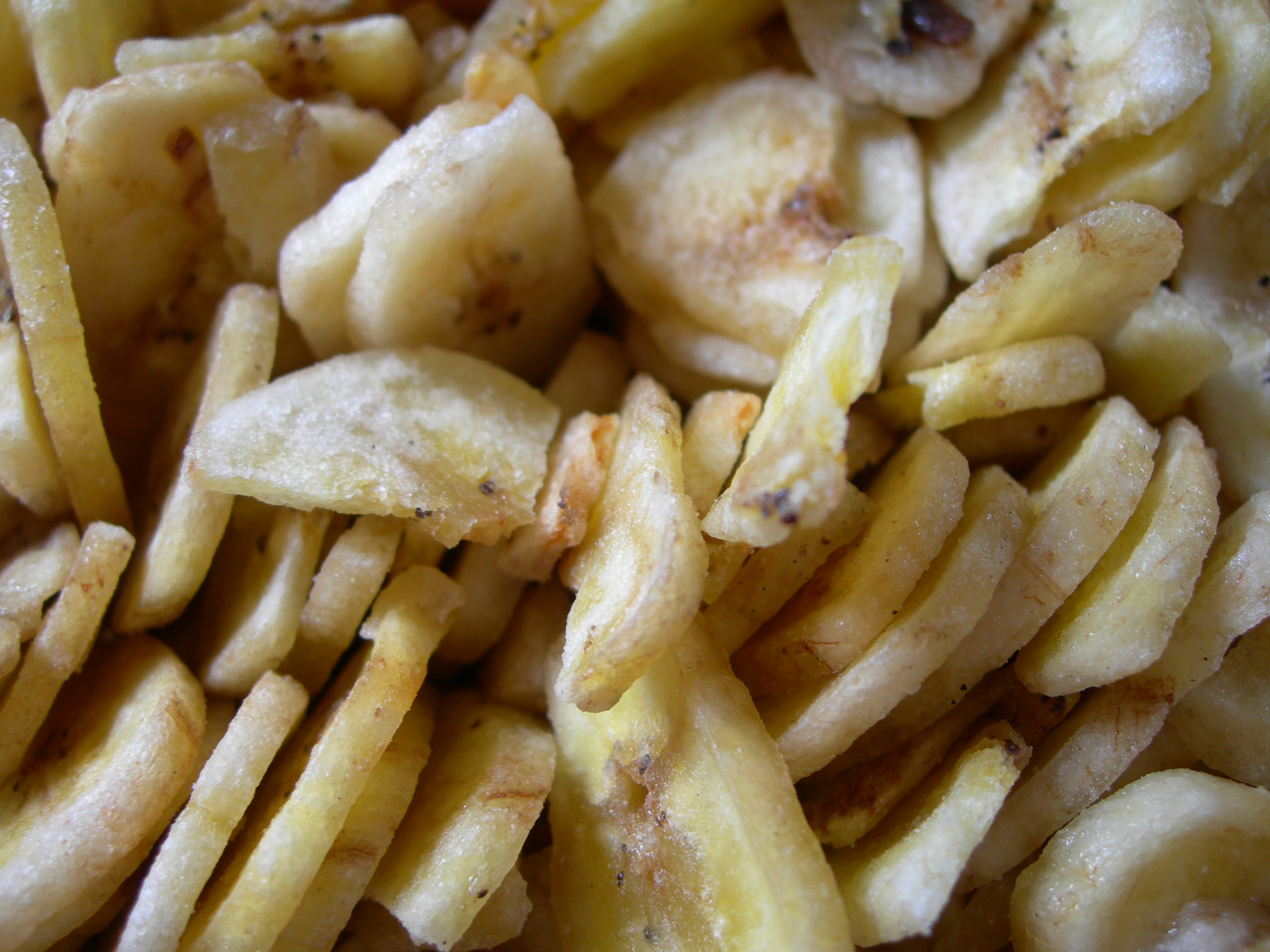
Dried banana chips

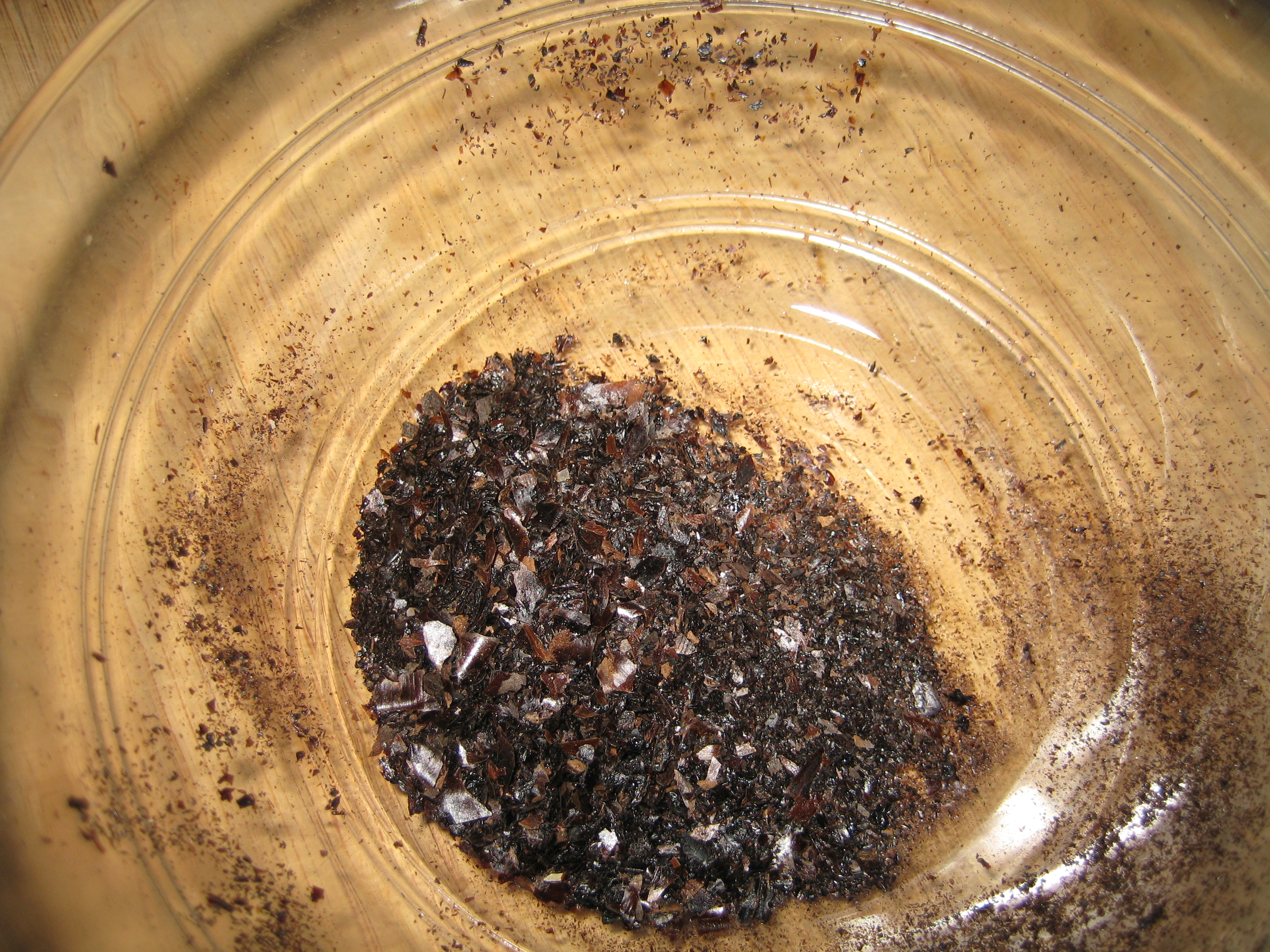
Dried, ground Persian black lime

==== C ====
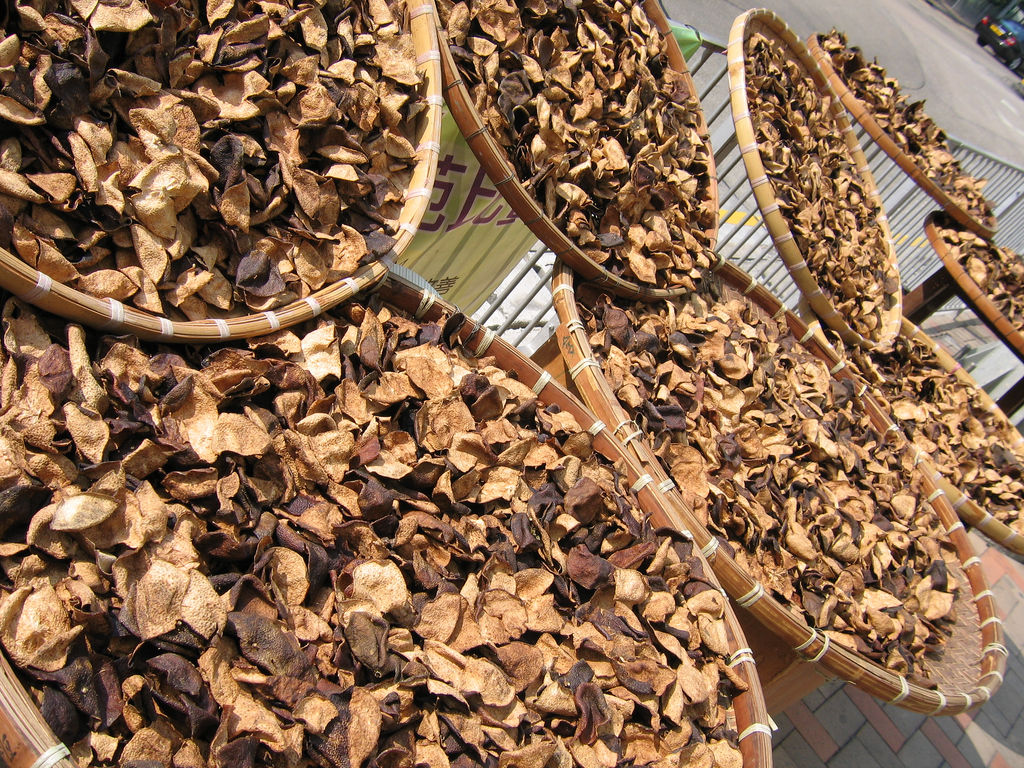
Chenpi drying in the sun in Hong Kong

- Chenpi – is sun-dried tangerine (mandarin) peel used as a traditional seasoning in Chinese cooking and traditional medicine.
- Dried cherries
- Chipotle – a smoked, dried jalapeño pepper.
- Coconut – can be dried whole or halved. A common product is coconut that has been dried and shredded.
- Dried cranberry – is made by partially dehydrating fresh cranberries, a process similar to making grapes into raisins.

==== D ====
- Dates, the fruit of date palm – can be dried, often by sun-drying.

==== F ====
- Dried fig – is used in food products such as fig rolls.
- Traditional dried fruit – are types of dried fruits that are either sun-dried, such as raisins and dried figs, or dehydrated in wind tunnels and other dryers, such as dried plums (prunes), apricots, and peaches.

==== G ====
- Goji, the fruit of Lycium barbarum – is usually sold in open boxes and small packages in dried form, and is traditionally cooked before consumption. The fruit is preserved by drying them in full sun on open trays or by mechanical dehydration employing a progressively increasing series of heat exposure over 48 hours.
- Gotgam (dried persimmon)
- Guajillo chili – a dried type of mirasol chili pepper.
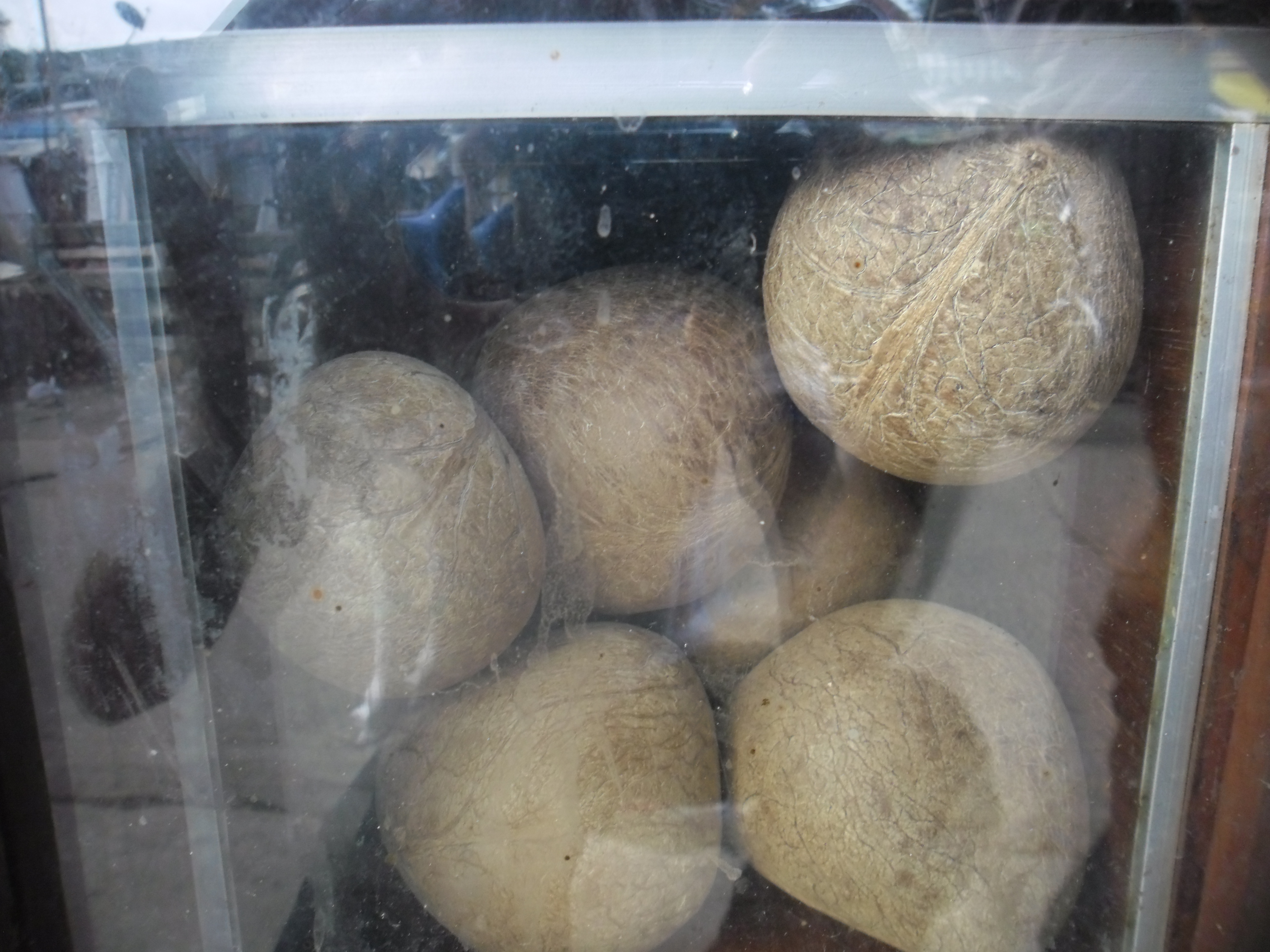
Dried coconuts

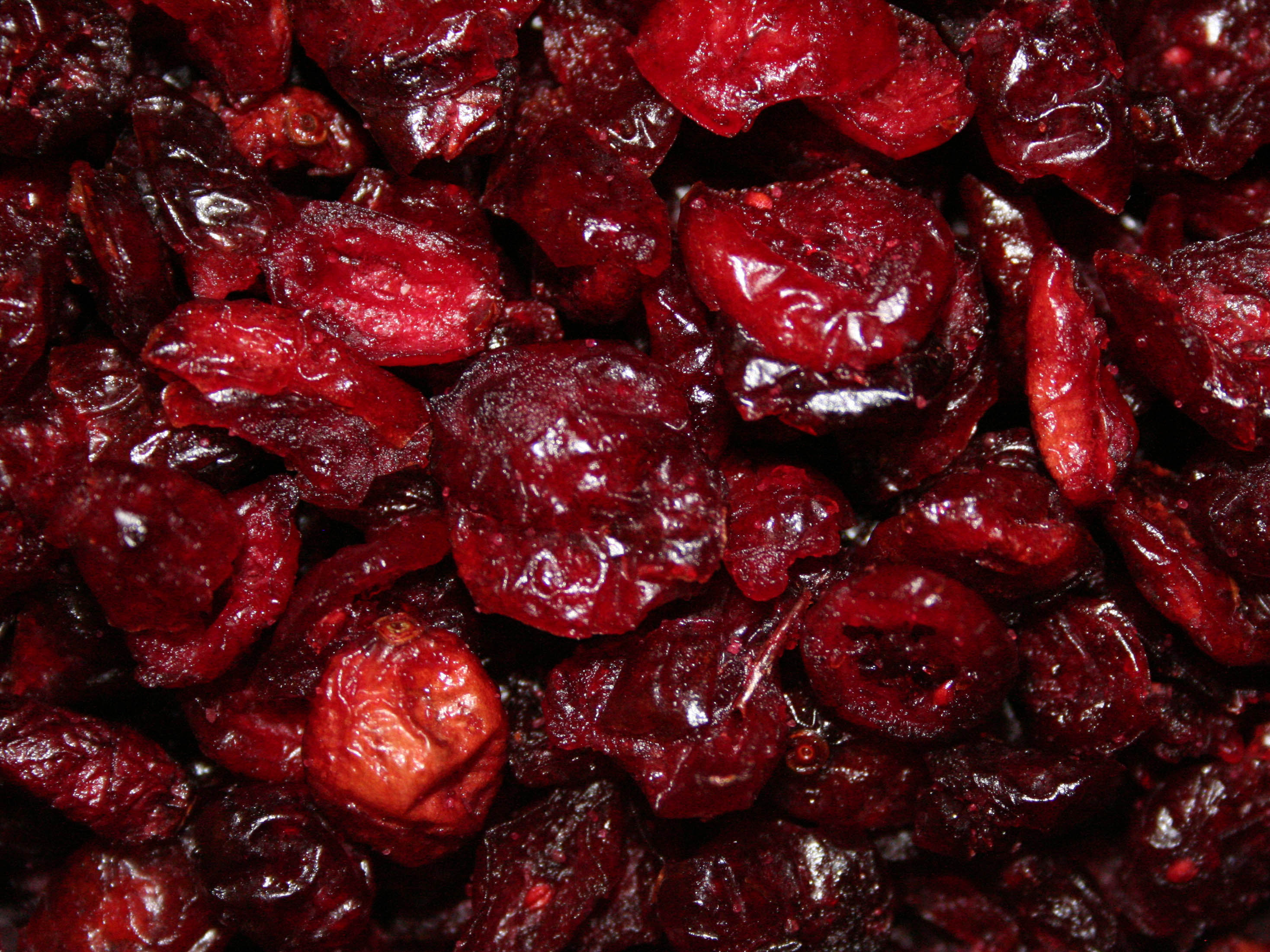
Dried cranberries

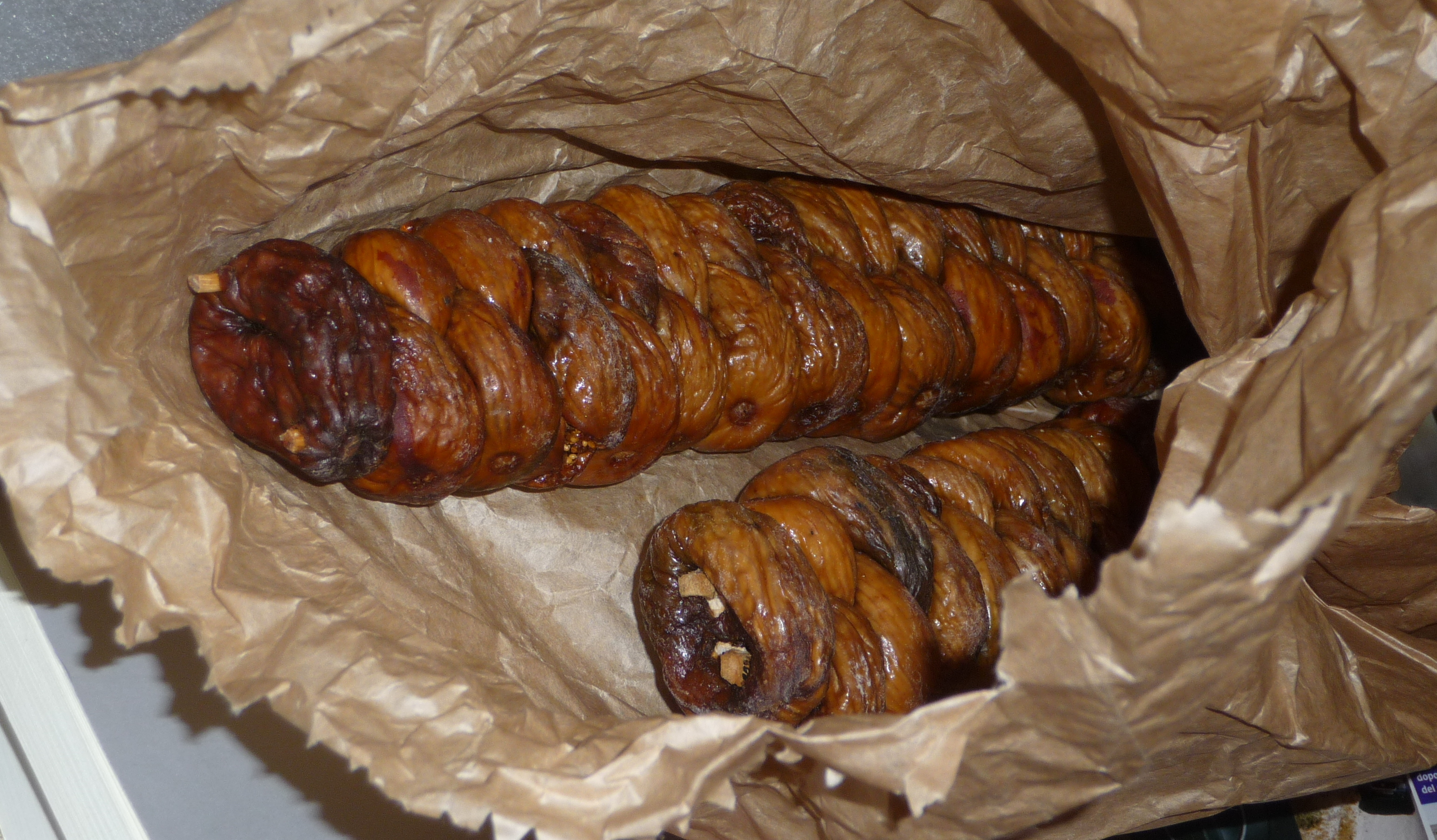
Dried figs

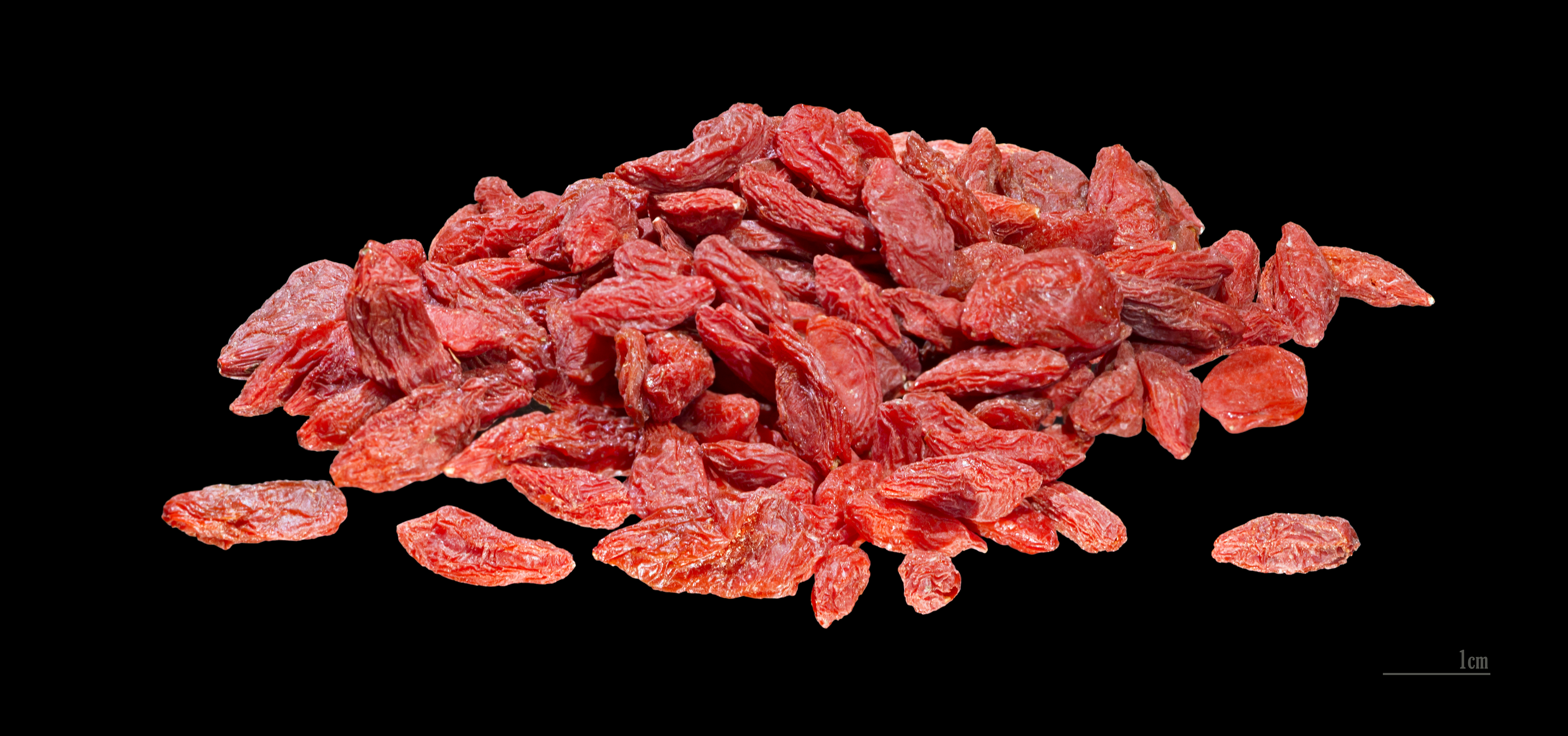
Dried goji berries

==== L ====
- Lavashak is a Persian fruit leather made of plums, apricots, or pomegranates.
- Li hing mui – is salty dried plum. In most parts of China, it is called huamei. It was made popular in Hawaii by Yee Sheong, who in early 1900s, had begun importing li hing mui and various other preserved fruits i.e. crack seed snacks from China to Hawaii. The red powder, called li hing powder, consists of ground-up plum skin that has previously been pickled in a combination of licorice, aspartame, food coloring, salt, and sugar.
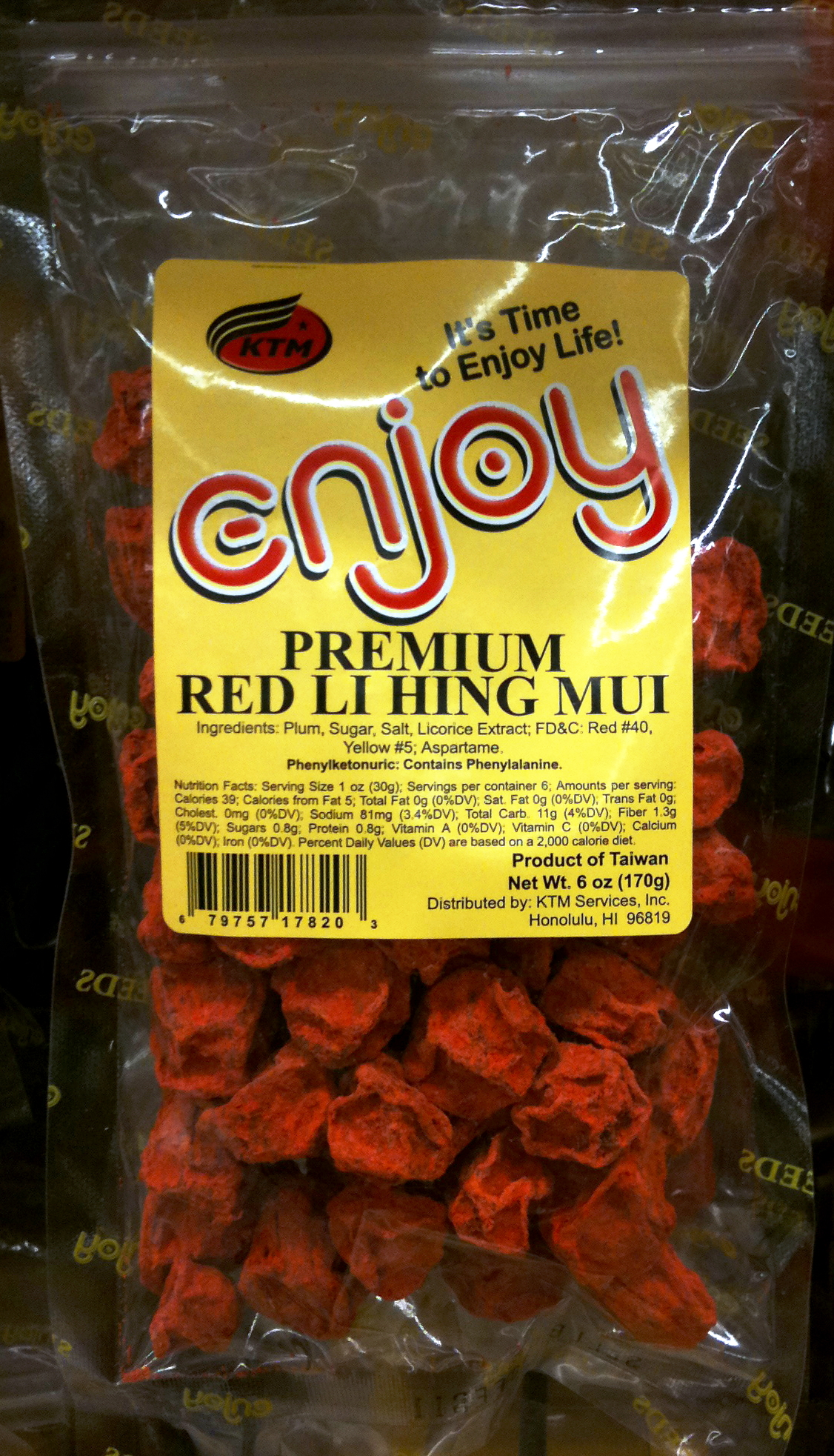
Red li hing mui sold in Maui, Hawaii

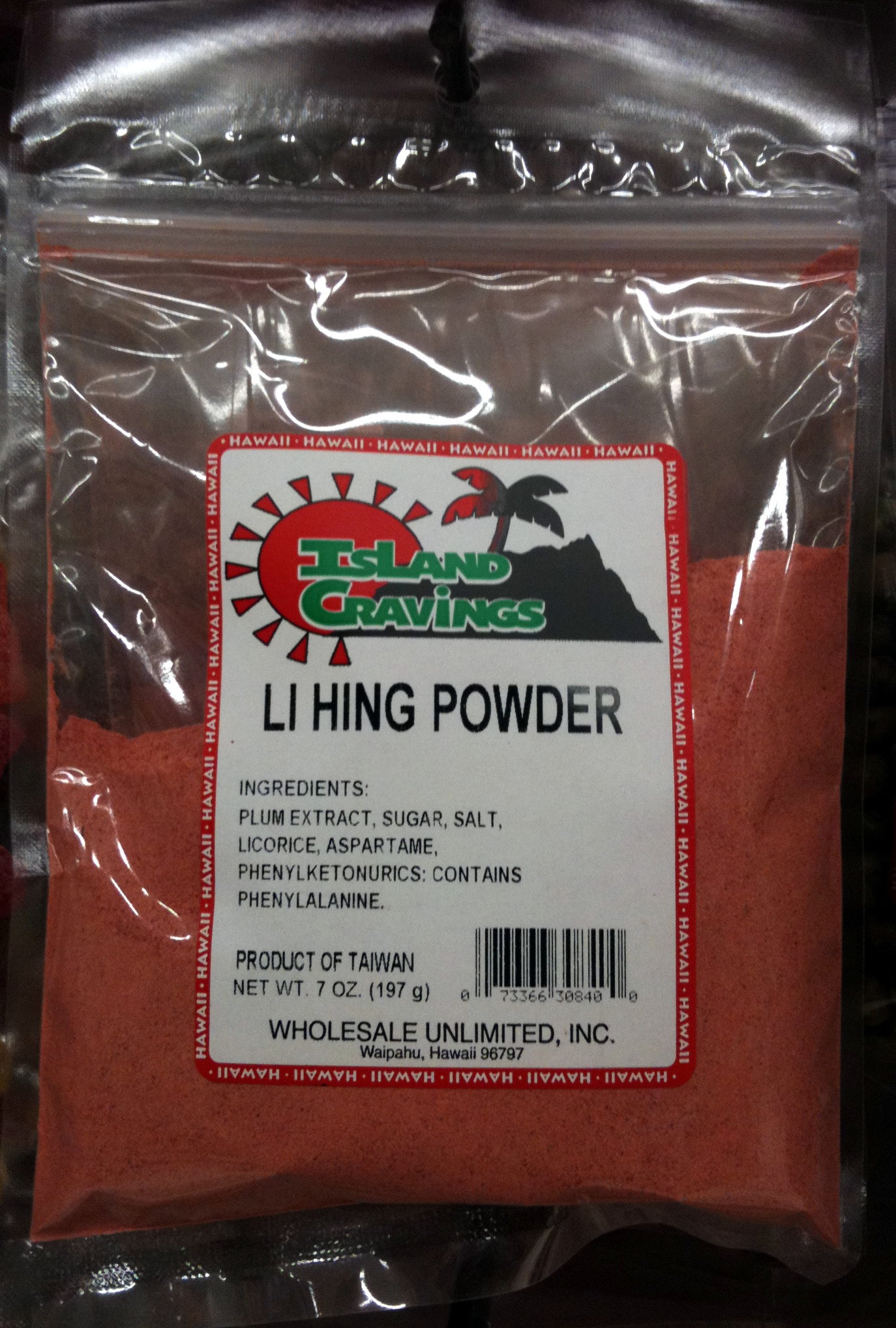
Packaged li hing powder found in Hawaii

==== M ====
- Dried mangoes – the fruit of the mango tree can be dried. The Philippines produces and exports dried mangoes. India popularly produces 'amchur' or dry mango as whole or powder, popularly used in pickles and masala.

==== N ====
- Nuts – are classified as a fruit. In a culinary context, a wide variety of dried seeds are often called nuts, but in a botanical context, only ones that include the indehiscent fruit are considered true nuts.

==== P ====
- Papaya
- Pasilla – the dried form of the chilaca chili pepper.
- Peperone crusco (or "Crusco pepper") – a dried and sweet pepper, typical of Basilicata, Italy.
- Pink peppercorn – is a dried berry of the shrub Schinus molle, commonly known as the Peruvian peppertree. In 1982, the Food and Drug Administration of the United States banned the import of Brazilian peppercorns from France into the US, asserting that people who eat the berries risk an array of acute symptoms, such as swollen eyelids and indigestion. In response, the government of France maintained that the berries are safe to eat if grown in prescribed conditions. The United States later lifted the ban.
- Prunes – are any of various plum cultivars, mostly Prunus domestica or European plum, sold as dried fruit. More than 1,000 cultivars of plums are grown for drying.

==== R ====
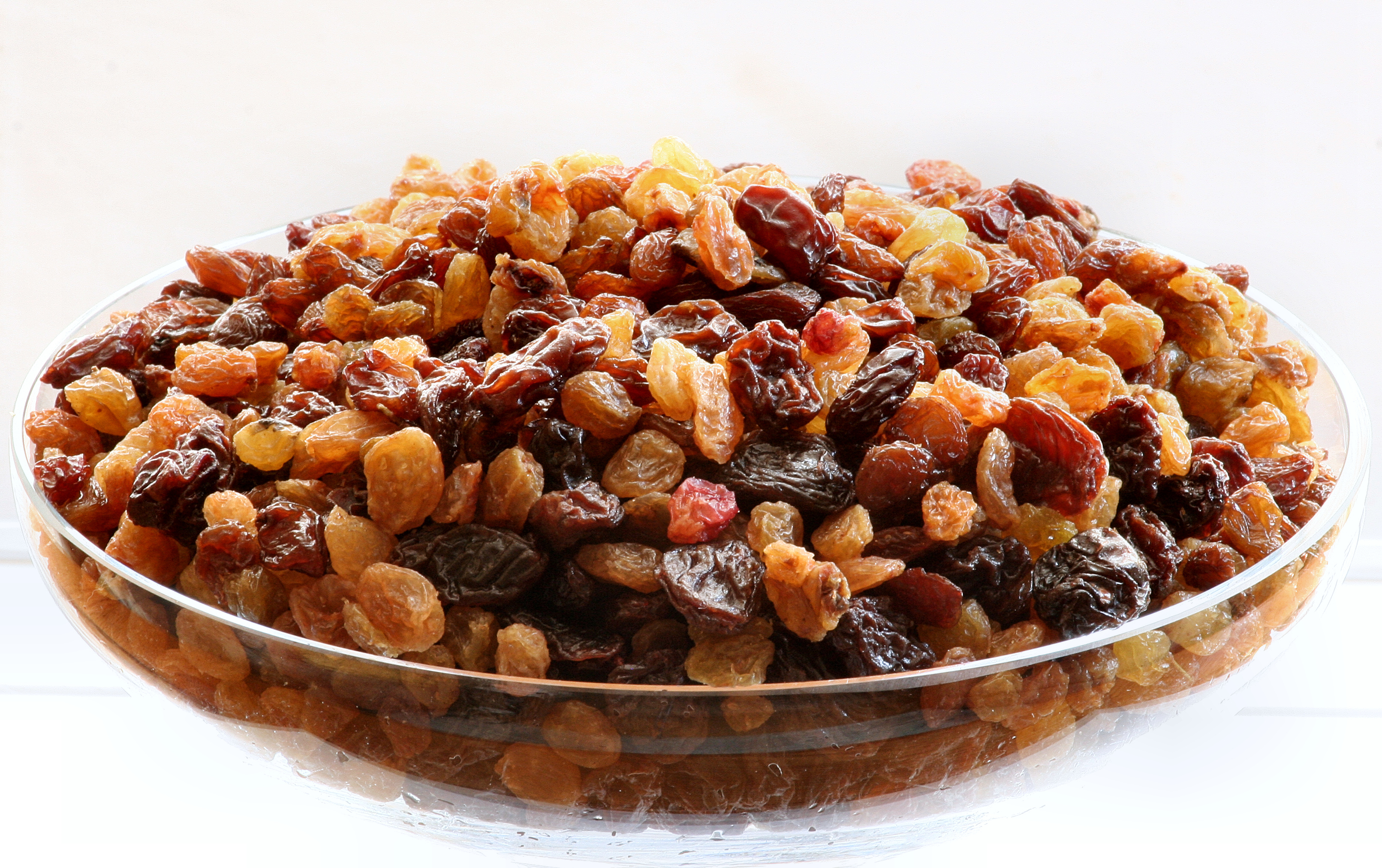
A variety of raisins from different grapes, some treated with sulfur dioxide for lighter color.

- Raisins – are dried grapes produced in many regions of the world, and may be eaten raw or used in cooking, baking, and brewing.
- A ristra – is an arrangement of drying chili pepper pods, used to dry them and also for decoration.
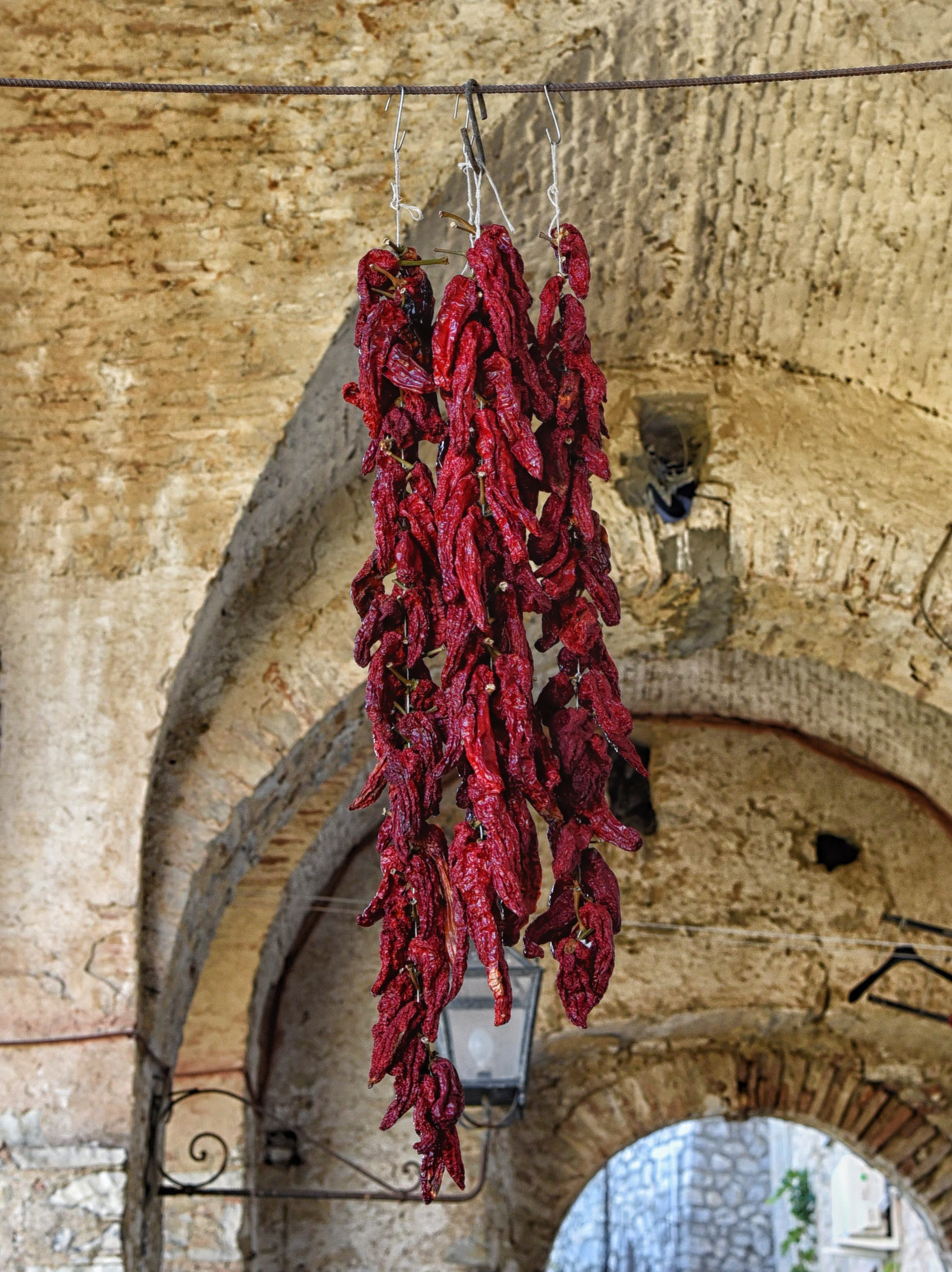
Chains of peperoni cruschi in Rotondella, Basilicata

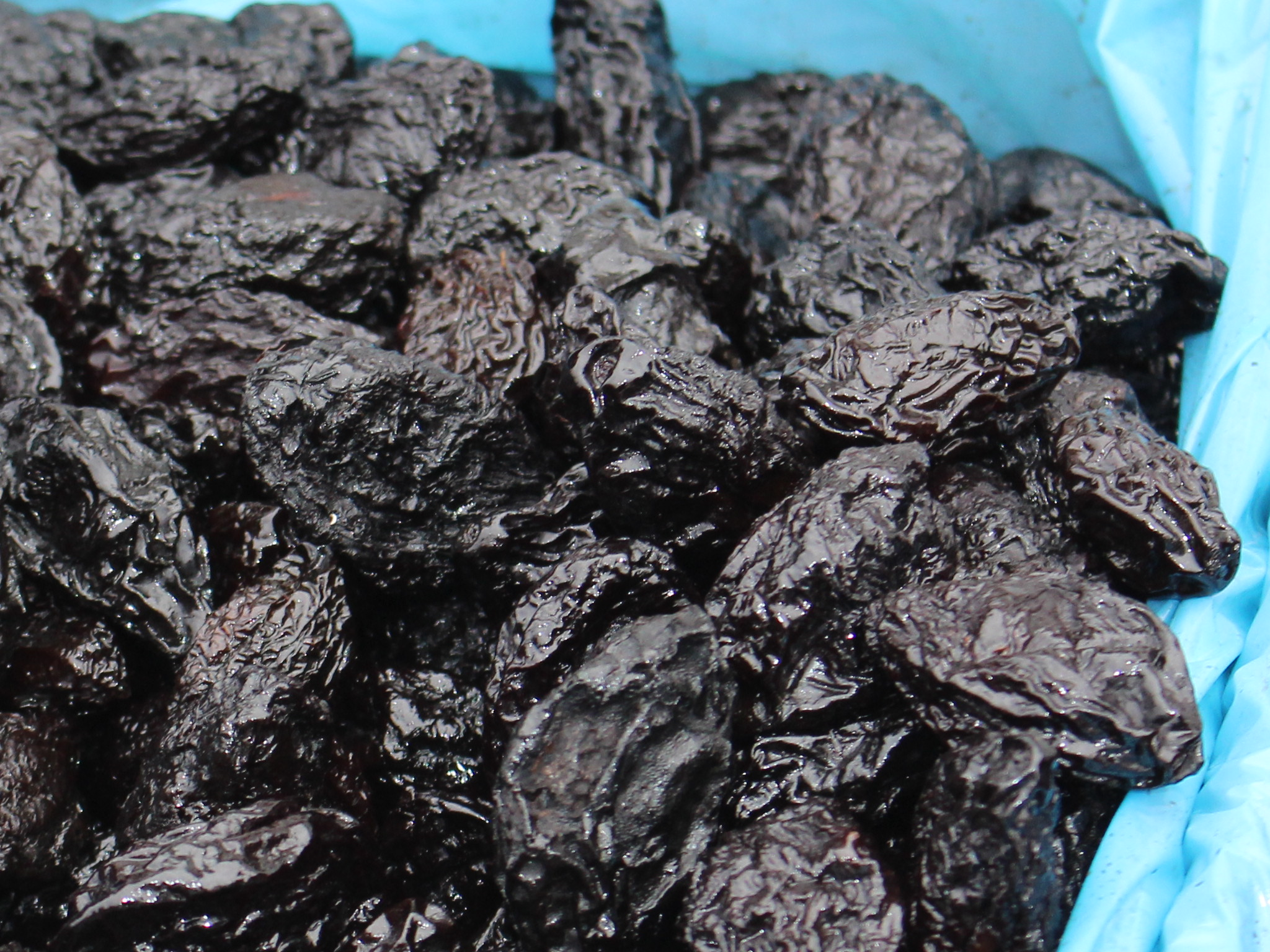
Prunes

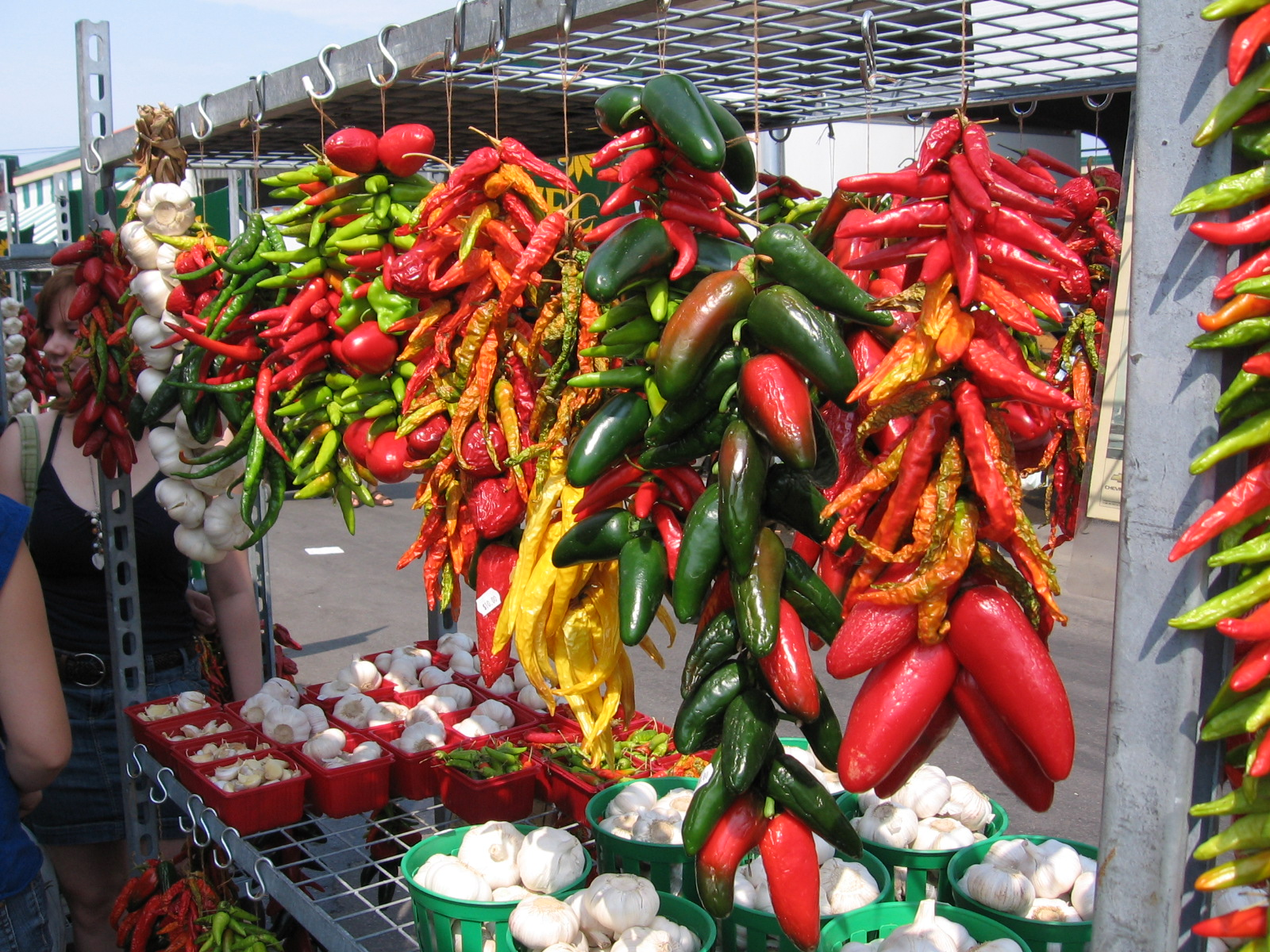
Ristras of jalapeños, other chili peppers, and garlic at a market in Montreal

==== S ====
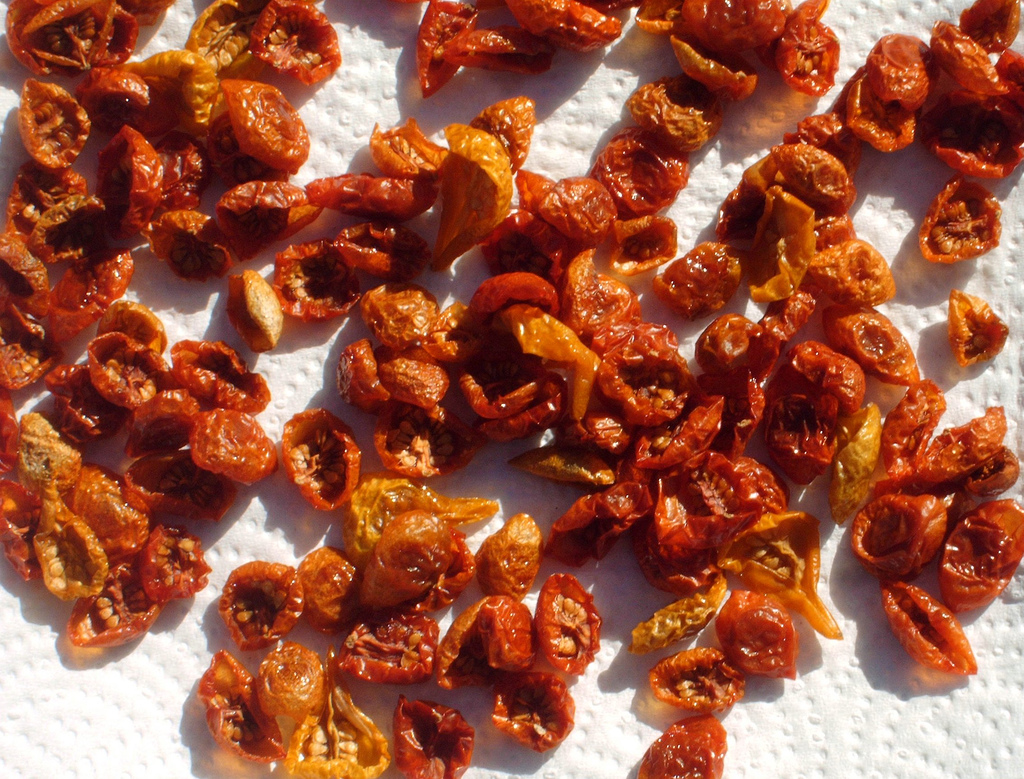
Sun-dried tomatoes

- Saladitos are dried, salted plums, which can also be sweetened with sugar and anise or coated in chili and lime.

==== T ====
- Tklapi – puréed fruit leather.
- Sun-dried tomato – ripe tomatoes that lose most of their water content after spending a majority of their drying time in the sun. These tomatoes are usually treated with sulfur dioxide or salt before being placed in the sun in order to improve quality.

==== W ====
- Watermelon – can be freeze dried or rack dried like other fruits and vegetables and retains its nutritional value.
- Wolfberry – or "goji berry" (Lycium chinense), is one of two species of boxthorn in the family Solanaceae from which the fruit is harvested, the other being Lycium barbarum.

=== Dried vegetables ===
Many types of dried and dehydrated vegetables exist, such as potatoes, beans, snap beans, lima beans, leafy vegetables, carrot, corn and onion.

==== C ====
- Chuño – freeze-dried potato product traditionally made by Quechua and Aymara communities of Bolivia and Peru, and known in various countries of South America, including Argentina, Bolivia, Chile, and Peru.

==== D ====
- Daikon – cut and dried, is called kiriboshi daikon, which is one of several common dried vegetables in Japan. It needs a rehydrating process before cooking or eating.

==== G ====
- Garri: dried cassava flakes popular in West African cuisine

==== H ====
- Hoshi-imo – Japanese snack made of dried sweet potatoes.

==== L ====
- Lefse – a Norwegian flatbread made with potatoes. When dried it can last up to 6 months.

==== N ====
- Nori – Japanese name for an edible dried seaweed sheet used to wrap sushi rolls and as a garnish in soups such as miso soup.

==== O ====
- Orunla is a dried okro from the Yoruba people of West Africa that comes in both powdered and chunky forms. It is used to make obe orunla.

==== P ====
- Instant mashed potatoes – have been through an industrial process of cooking, mashing and dehydrating to yield a packaged convenience food that can be reconstituted in the home in seconds by adding hot water and/or milk, producing a close approximation of mashed potatoes with very little expenditure of time and effort. A similar product is dehydrated shredded potatoes.

==== V ====
- Vegetable chips – can be prepared by simply drying or by frying sliced vegetables.
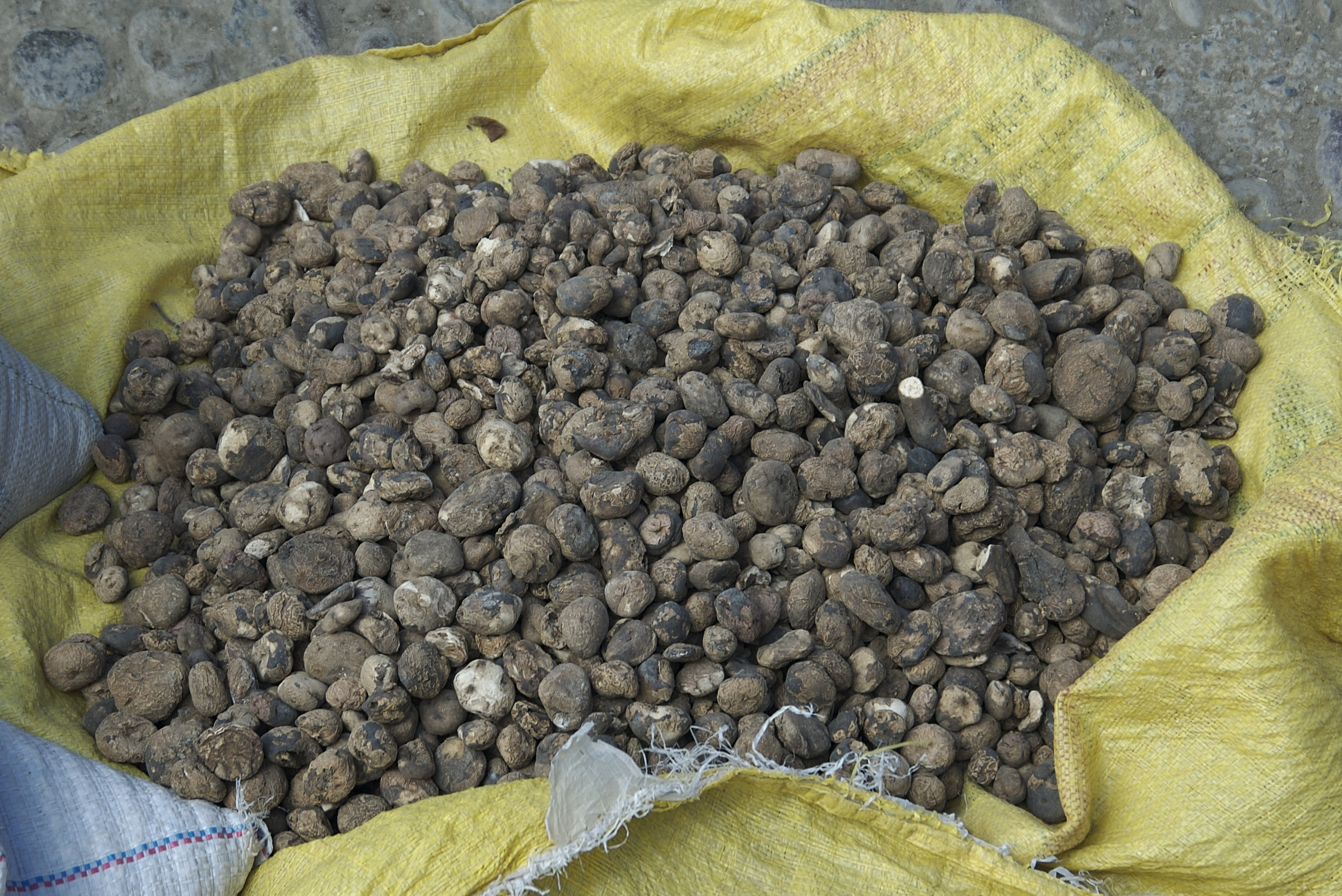
Chuño

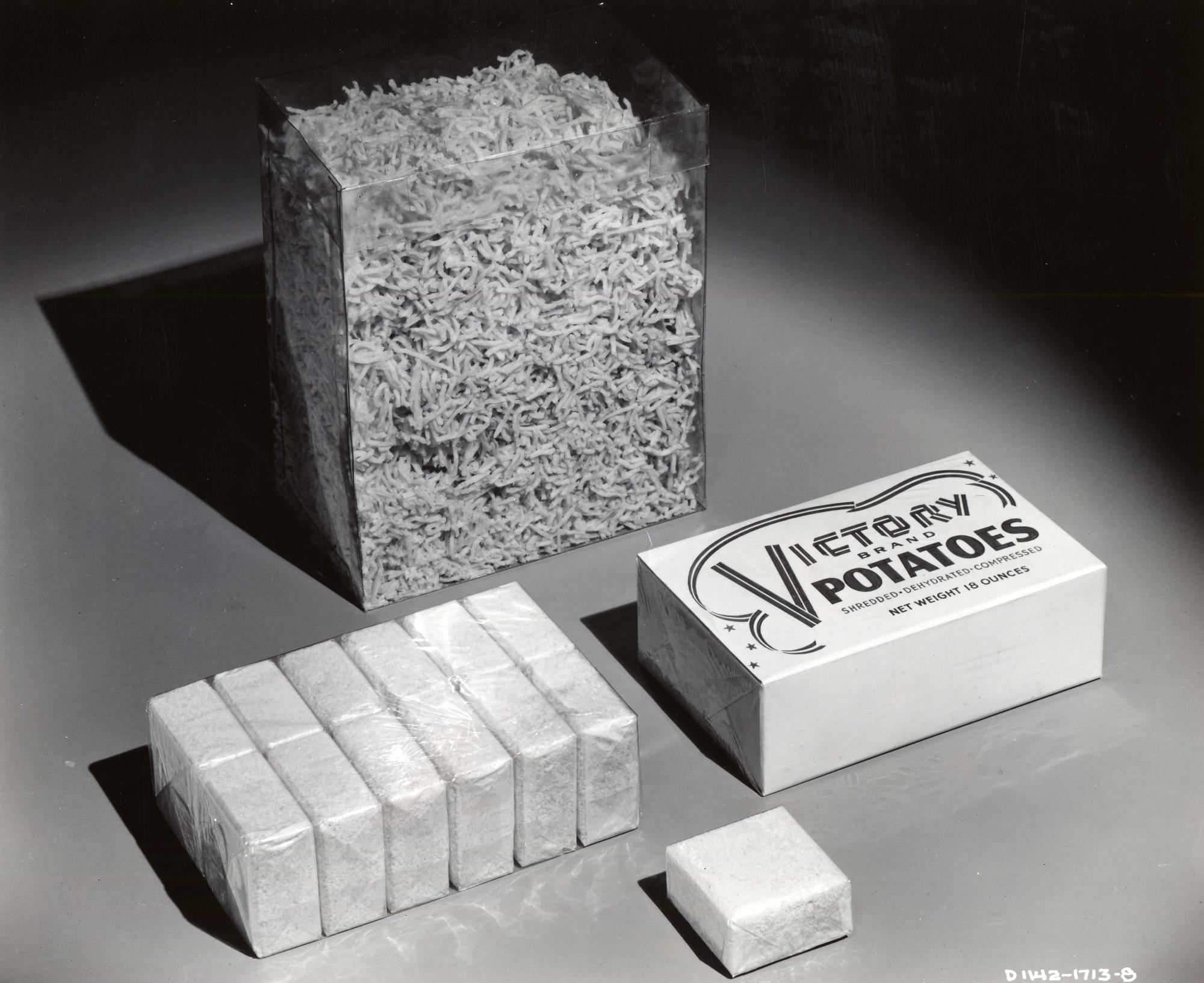
Dehydrated shredded potatoes

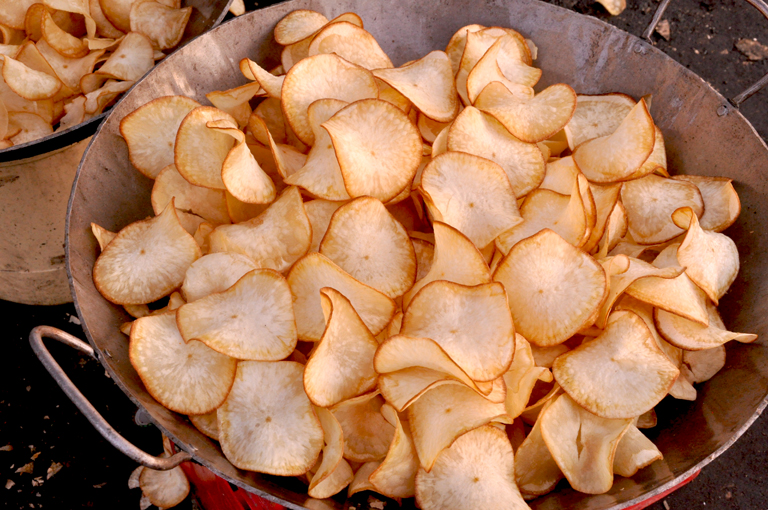
Deep-fried cassava chips, a type of vegetable chip

=== Dried seeds ===
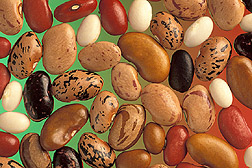
Dry common beans

- Beans – is a common name for large plant seeds used for human food or animal feed of several genera of the family Fabaceae (alternately Leguminosae). The term is sometimes used as a synonym of pulse, though the term pulses is usually reserved for leguminous crops harvested for their dry grain. Dried beans include kidney beans, black turtle beans, pinto beans, and several others.
- Grain – consists of wheat, corn, soybean, rice, and other grains as sorghum, sunflower seeds, rapeseed/canola, barley, oats, etc. are dried in grain dryers. In the main agricultural countries, drying comprises the reduction of moisture from about 17–30% to 8-15%, depending on the grain. The final moisture content for drying must be adequate for storage. Additional grains include lentils, wild rice, chick peas, and millet.
- Egusi: Dried melon seeds used in west African cooking, popular for Egusi sauce.
- Some varieties of maize (usually called corn in North America) are dried to produce popcorn. Popcorn kernels with a high moisture content will pop when freshly harvested, but not well, and are also susceptible to mold when stored. So, popcorn growers and distributors dry the kernels until they reach the moisture level at which they expand (pop) the most when cooked. Dried maize left on the ear is also used for decorative purposes.
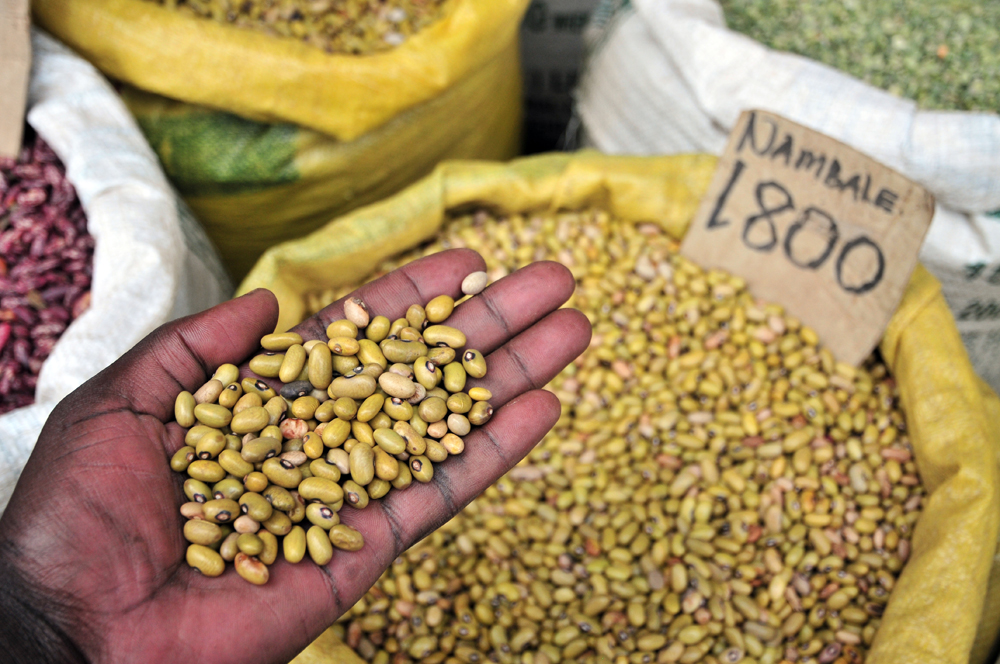
Beans at a market

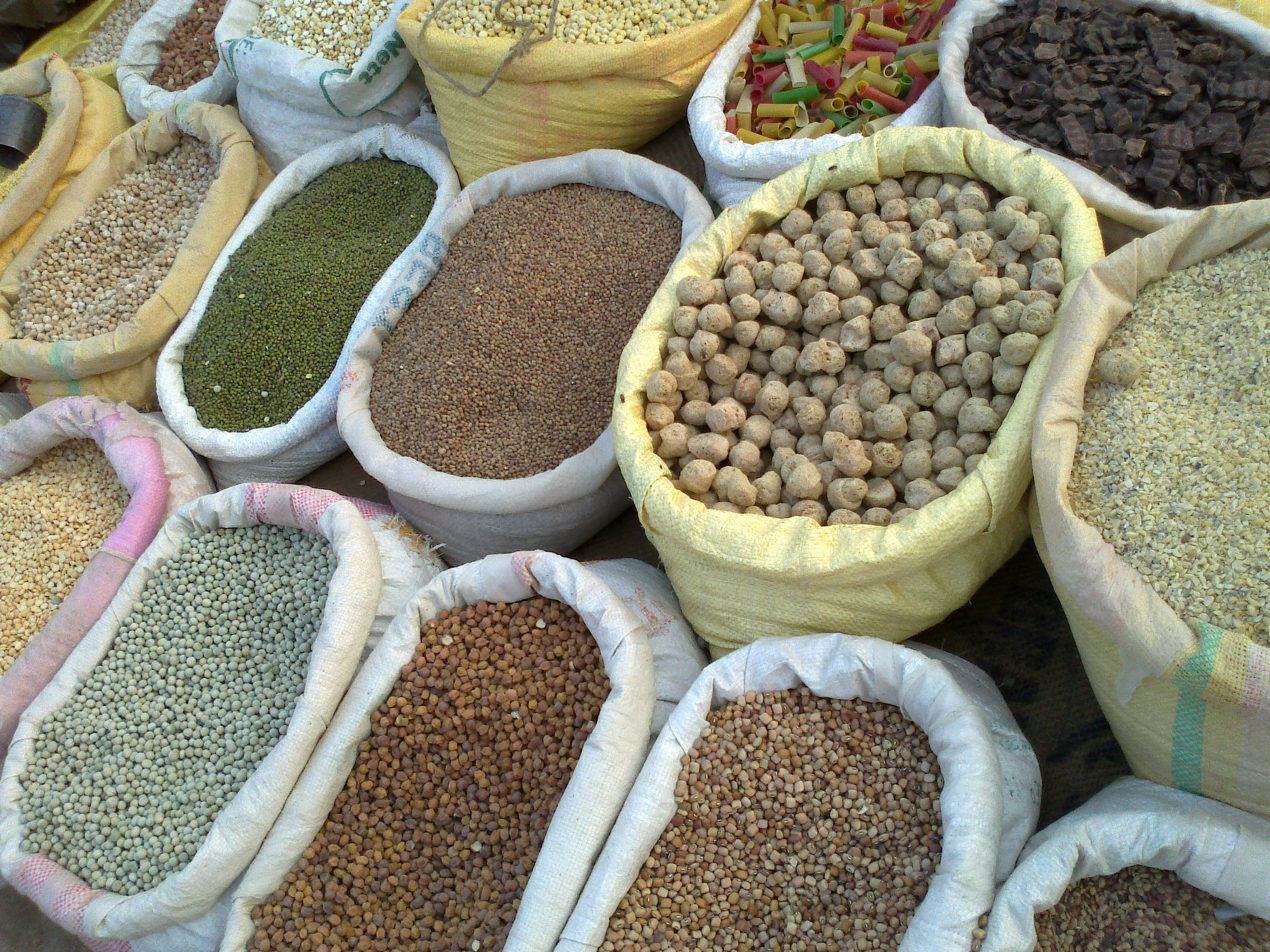
Grains at a market

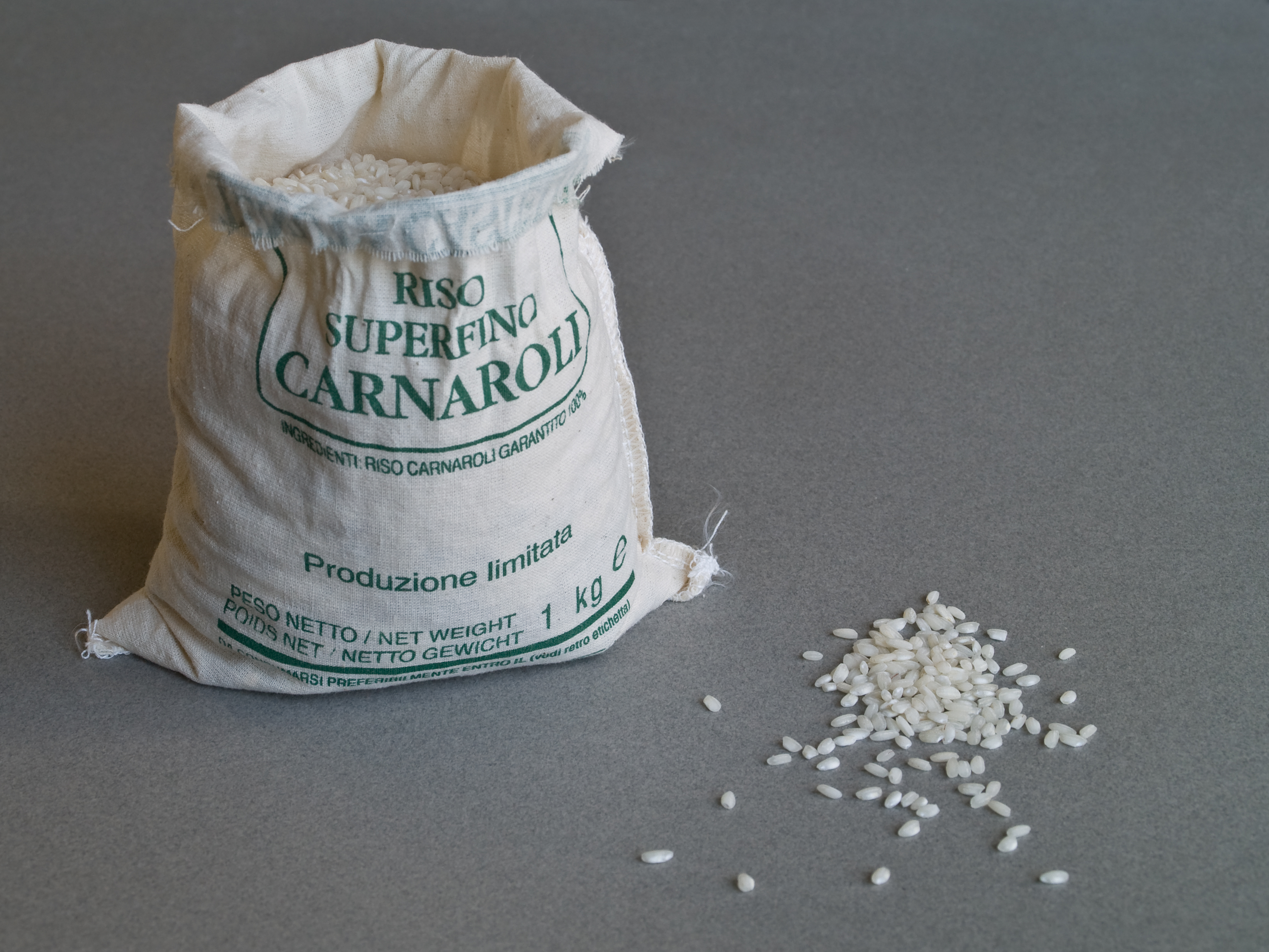
Carnaroli, an Italian variety of rice

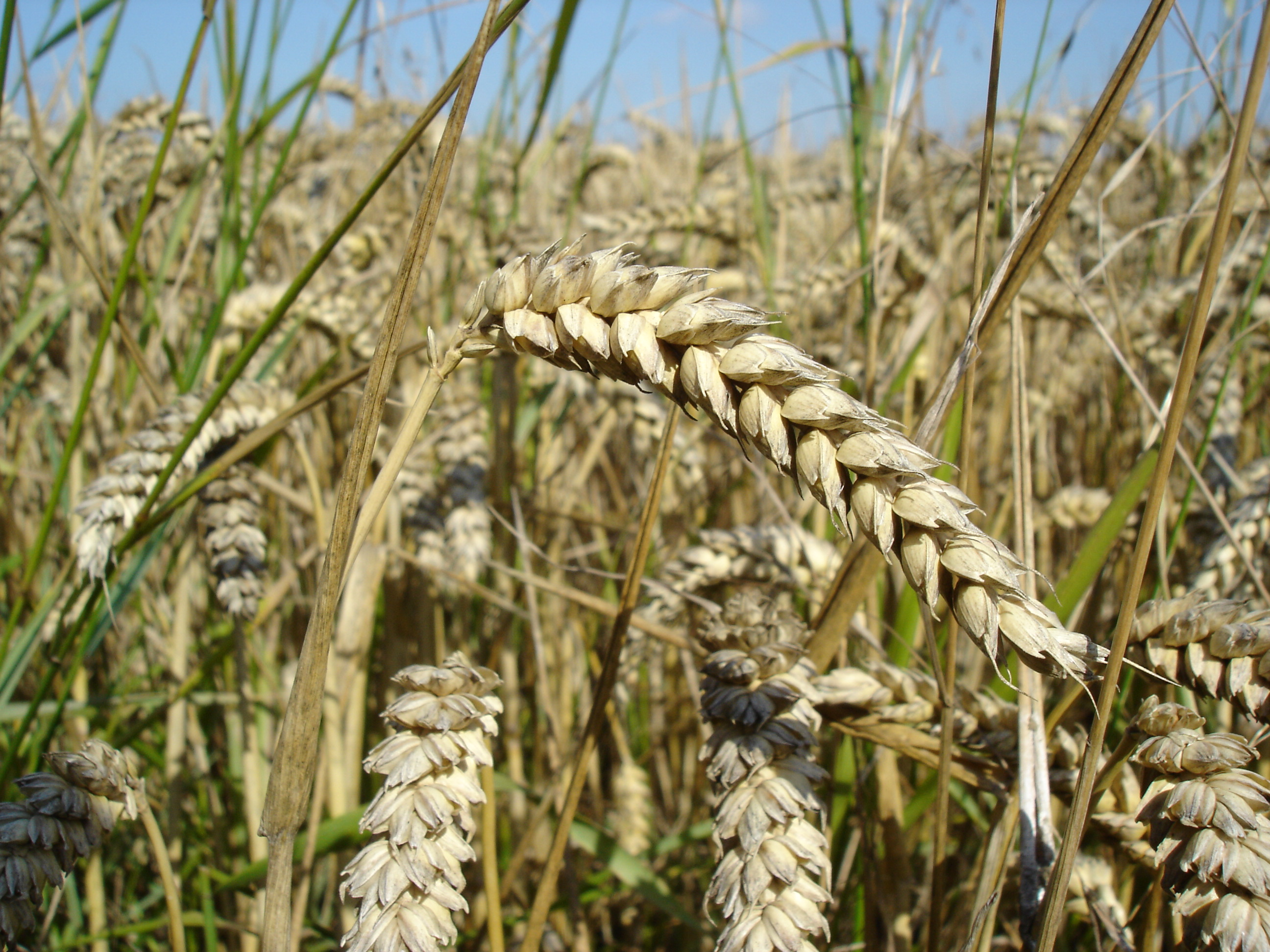
Wheat

=== Dried flowers and herbs ===
Dried hibiscus sabdariffa calyxes are used to make zobo drink and other products in Africa.

== Fungi foods ==
- Dried mushrooms – typically prepared by sun-drying, hot-air drying or freeze-drying. Some types of mushrooms that are prepared dried include shiitake, straw and morel mushrooms.
- Mushroom extract – a paste-like, concentrated extract made from dried edible mushrooms. Mushroom extract is used to add flavor to soups, sauces, soy sauce and other foods.

== Animal foods ==
Meat has been preserved by drying salted meats and through smoking since the Paleolithic era.

=== Dried fish and seafood ===
Drying fish is a method of food preservation that works by removing water from the fish, which inhibits the growth of microorganisms. Open-air drying using sun and wind has been practiced since ancient times to preserve food. Fish are also preserved through such traditional methods as smoking and salting.

==== B ====
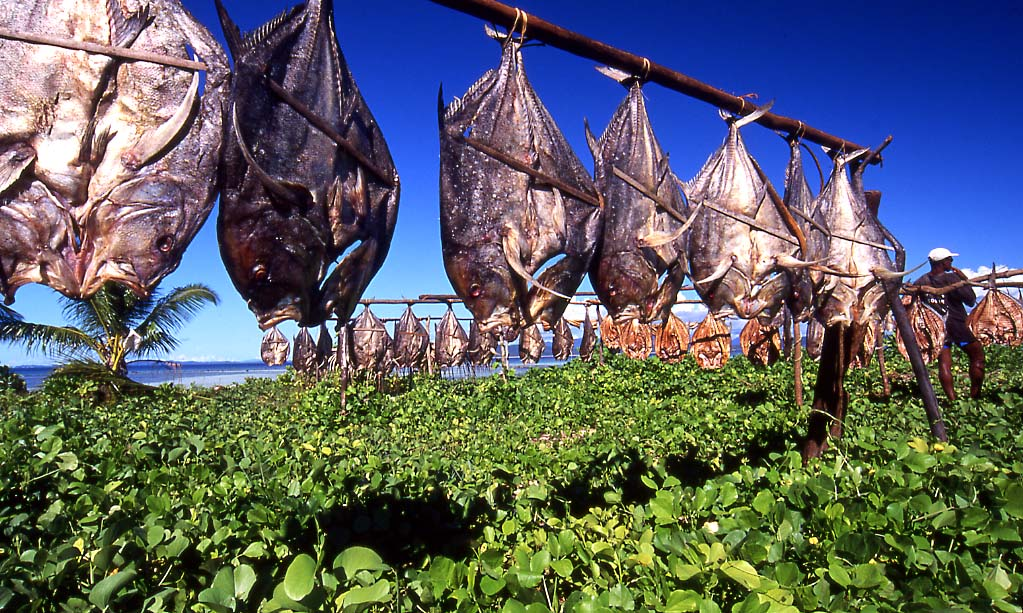
Flattened fish drying in the sun in Madagascar

- Bacalhau – the Portuguese word for cod and, in a culinary context, dried and salted cod. Bacalhau dishes are common in Portugal, Brazil and Galicia, in the northwest of Spain, and to a lesser extent in former Portuguese colonies like Angola, Macau, and Goa.
- Balyk – salted and dried soft parts of fish, usually coming from large valuable species: acipenseridae (e.g., sturgeon) or salmonidae (salmon).
- Bokkoms – whole, salted and dried mullet (more specifically the Southern mullet, Liza richardsonii, a type of fish commonly known in the Western Cape of South Africa as "harders"), and is a well-known delicacy from the West Coast region of South Africa.
- Boknafisk – a variant of stockfish and is unsalted fish partially dried by sun and wind on drying flakes ('hjell') or on a wall. Boknafisk is mostly associated with North Norway, but it is eaten along the entire Norwegian coast down to Bergen.
- Budu – a sauce traditionally made by mixing anchovy and salt in the range of ratio of 2:1 to 6:1 and then fermenting for 140 to 200 days.

==== C ====
- Dried clam
- Dried cod skin – is a cod skin that has been dried either by air-drying, dehydration, sun-drying or food drying. Dried cod skin is popular as a dog treat.
- Dried and salted cod – or "salt cod", is cod which has been preserved by drying after salting. Cod which has been dried without the addition of salt is stockfish.
- Conpoy – a type of dried seafood product made from the adductor muscle of scallops.
- Craster kipper – kippers from the Northumberland village of Craster.

==== D ====
- Daing – also known as Tuyô or Bilad, refers to dried fish from the Philippines, a variant of daing known as labtingaw, which uses less salt and is dried for a much shorter period (only a few hours). The resulting daing is still slightly moist and meatier than the fully dried variant.

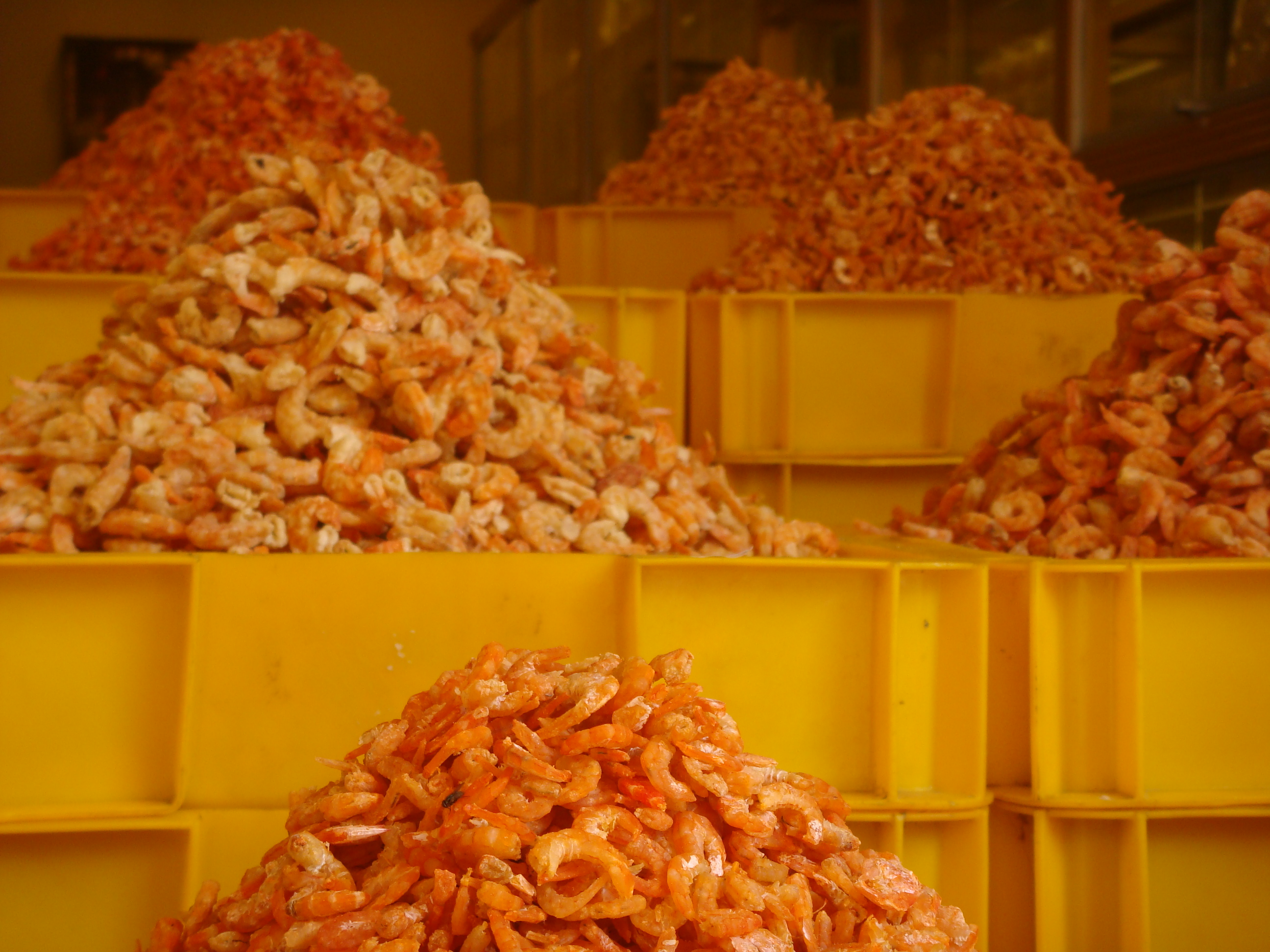
Dried shrimp for sale near Bến Thành Market, Saigon

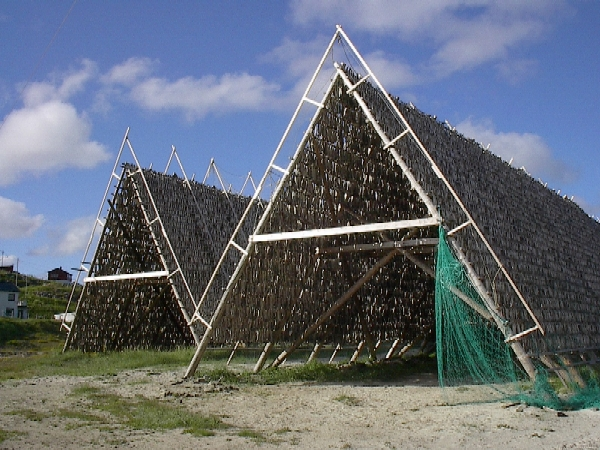
Boknafisk drying on hjells in Norway

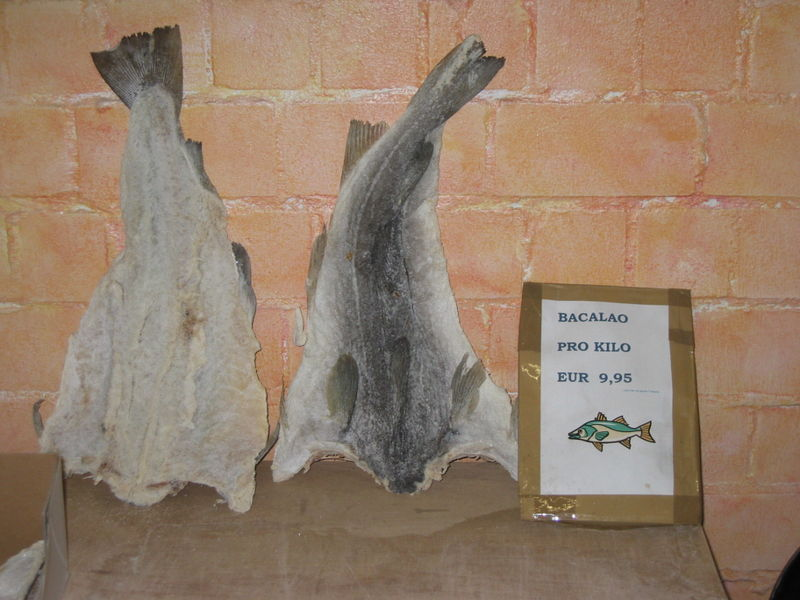
Salted and dried cod, produced in Norway

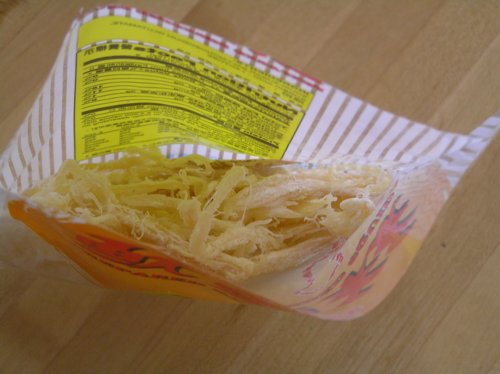
Commercially prepared dried shredded squid

==== E ====
- Eja Kika is a smoked dried fish in Yorubaland. It is used to make stews and soups. It is also used to eat garri and ogi. Eja gbigbe is a term used to refer to a variety of dried fishes that are either smoked or sun and wind dried.

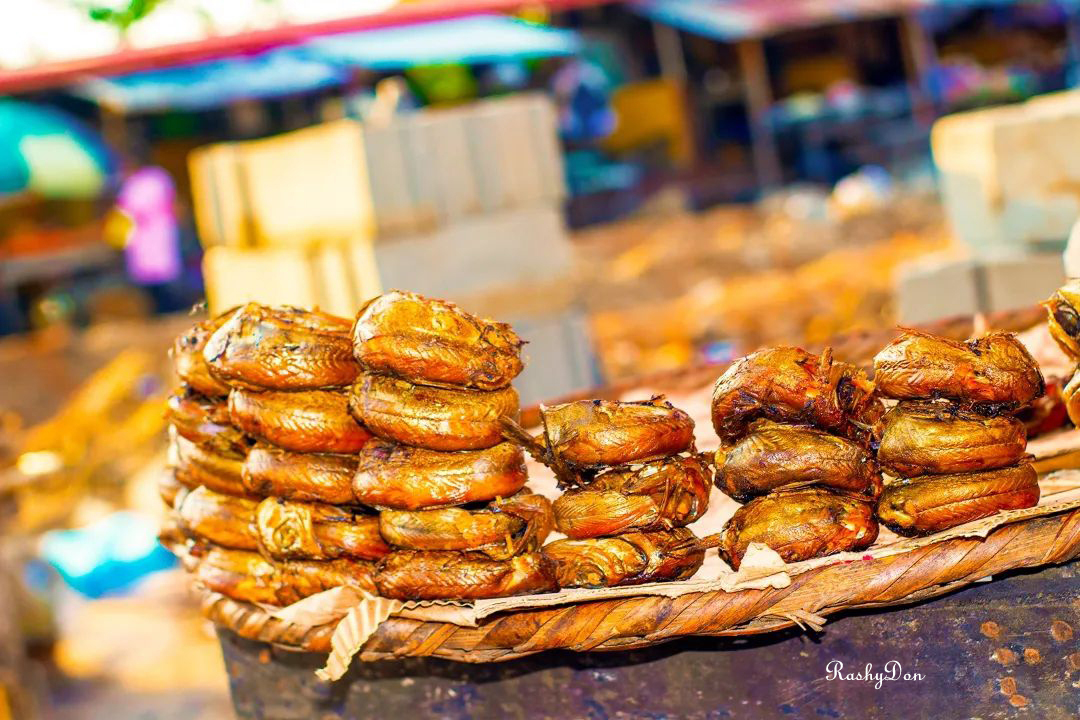
Eja kika

==== F ====
- Fesikh – a traditional Egyptian fish dish consisting of fermented salted and dried gray mullet, of the mugil family, a saltwater fish that lives in both the Mediterranean and the Red Seas.

==== G ====
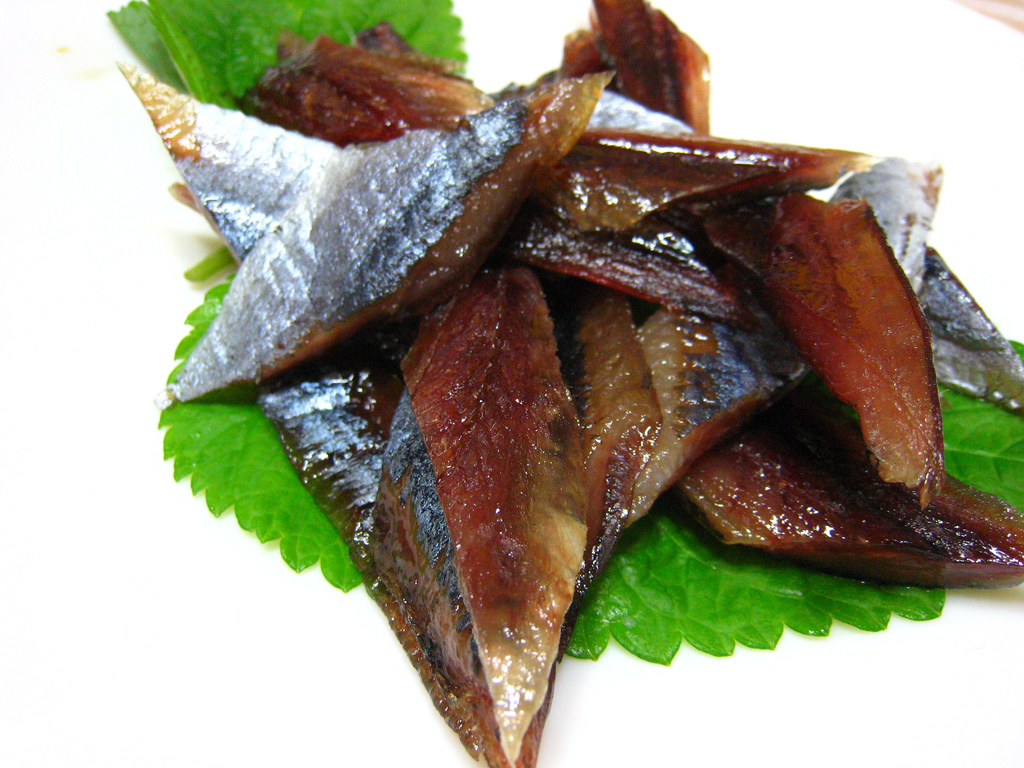
Gwamegi

- Gwamegi – a Korean half-dried Pacific herring or Pacific saury made during winter. It is mostly eaten in the region of North Gyeongsang Province such as Pohang, Uljin, and Yeongdeok where a large amount of the fish are harvested.

==== J ====
- Juipo – a traditional Korean pressed fish jerky sold as a street snack. Made from the filefish, it is dried, flattened and seasoned and has a subtle sweet flavor.

==== K ====
- Katsuobushi – the Japanese name for dried, fermented, and smoked skipjack tuna (Katsuwonus pelamis).
- Keumamah – traditional Acehnese dried fish.
- Kipper – a whole herring, a small, oily fish, that has been split in butterfly fashion from tail to head along the dorsal ridge, gutted, salted or pickled, and cold smoked over smouldering woodchips (typically oak).
- Kusaya – a salted-dried and fermented fish that is produced in the Izu Islands, Japan. Though the smell of kusaya is strong, its taste is quite mellow.
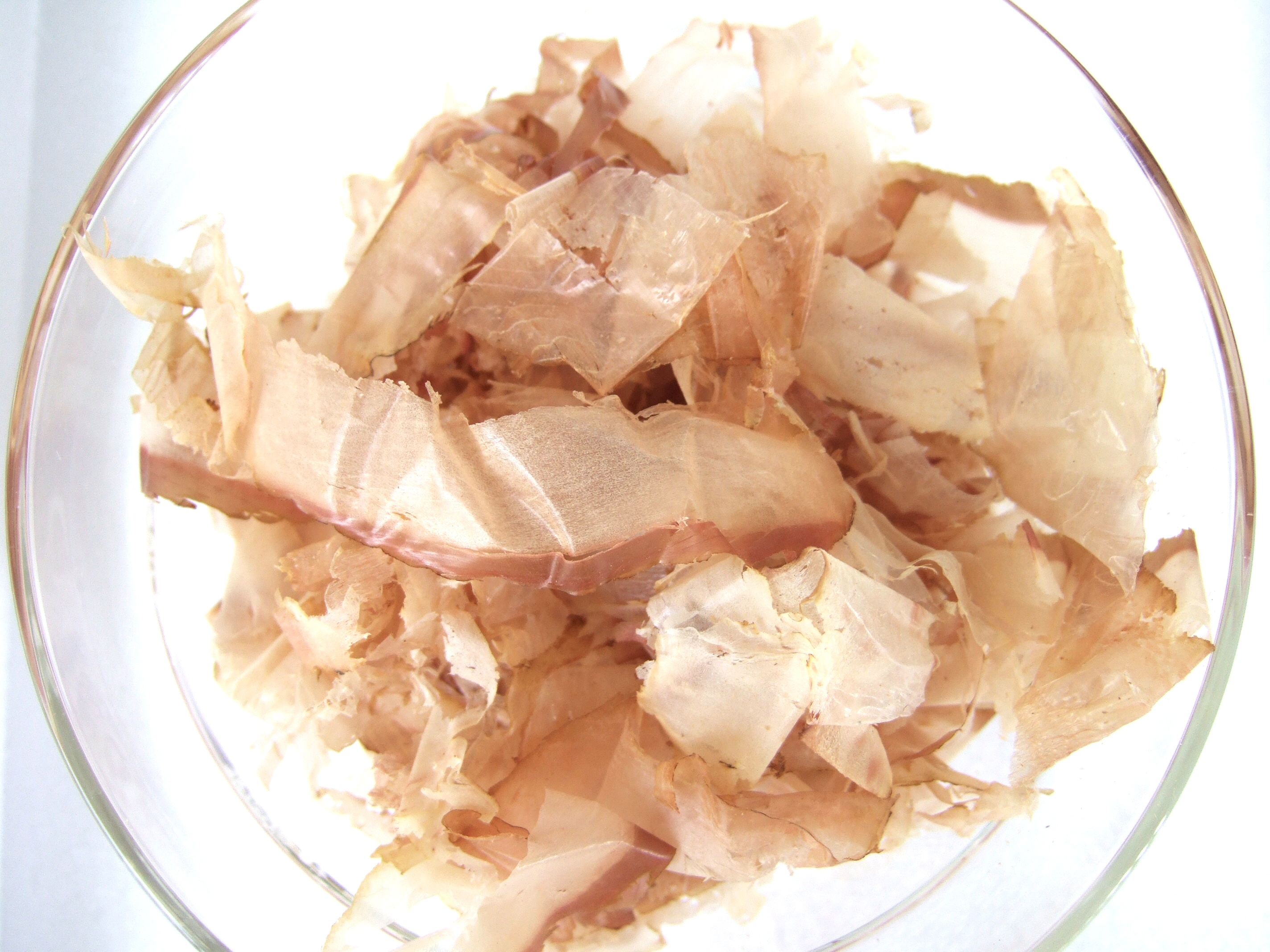
Katsuobushi shavings from a package

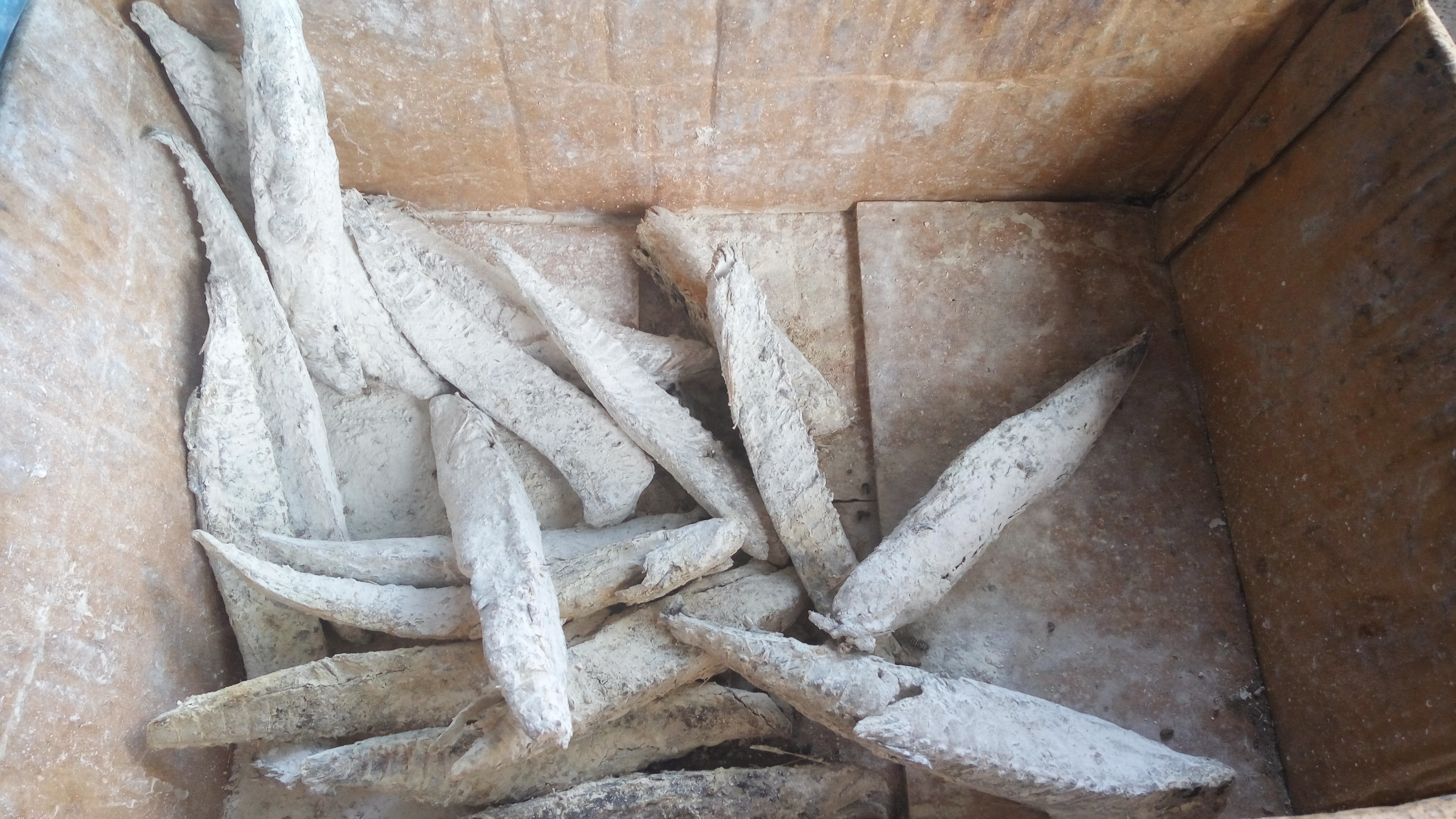
Keumamah

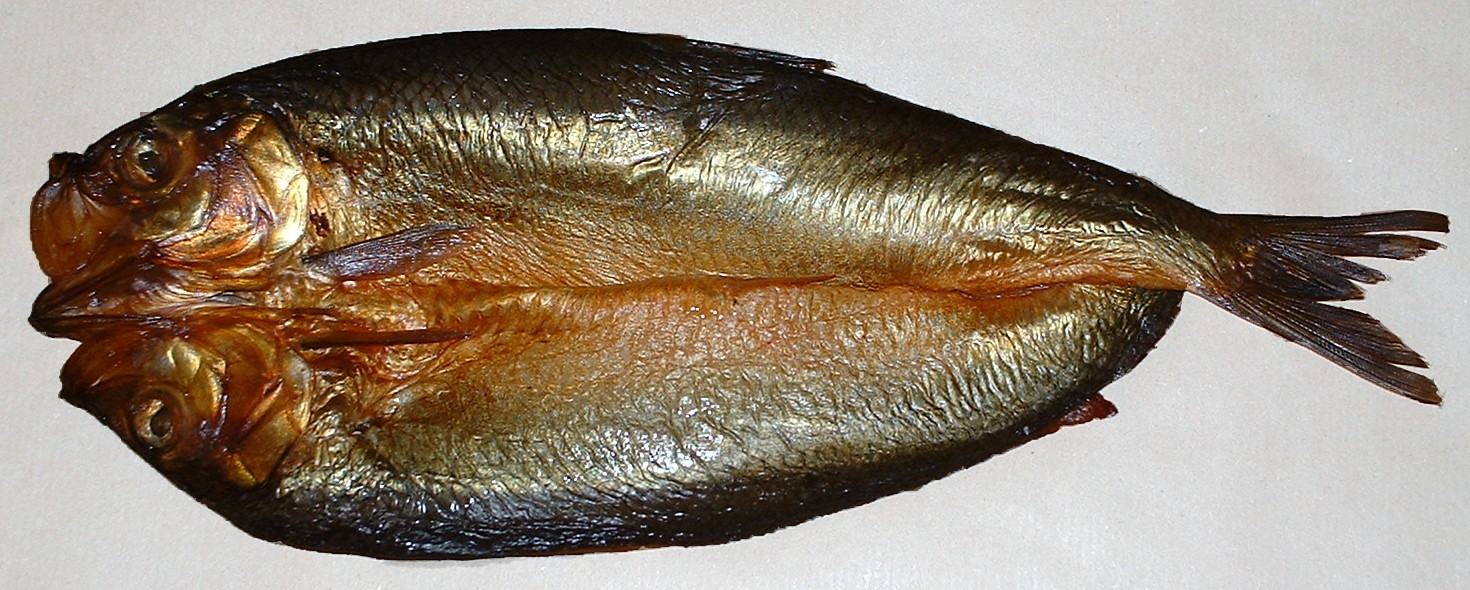
Kippered "split" herring

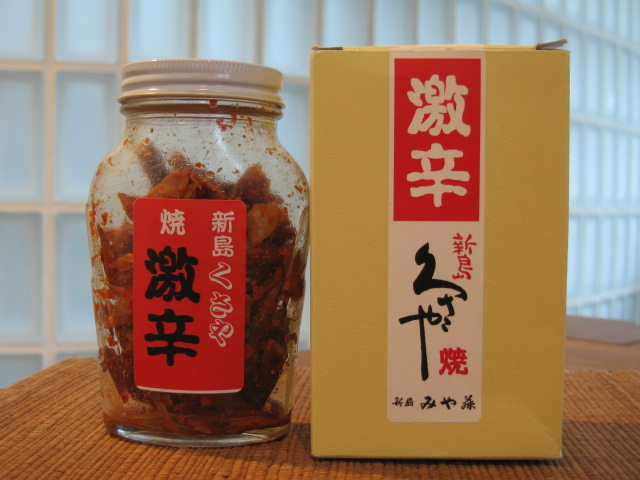
Bottled kusaya from Niijima

==== L ====
- Lutefisk – a Norwegian preserved food made from lye soaked and salted air-dried whitefish. Lutefisk means 'lye fish'.

==== M ====
- Mackerel – is dried in Greece, Turkey and Cyprus; this product is called "çiroz" in Turkey.
- Maldives fish – cured tuna fish traditionally produced in Maldives. It is a staple of the Maldivian cuisine, as well as of the Sri Lankan cuisine, and in the past it was one of the main exports from Maldives to Sri Lanka.
- Meat floss – a Chinese dried and powdered meat product.
- Mojama – a Spanish delicacy consisting of filleted salt-cured tuna, made using the loins of the tuna.

==== O ====
- Obambo – traditional dried fish of the Luo people of Kenya, and is a well known delicacy in the Western region of Kenya.
- Octopus – can be dried to preserve it.
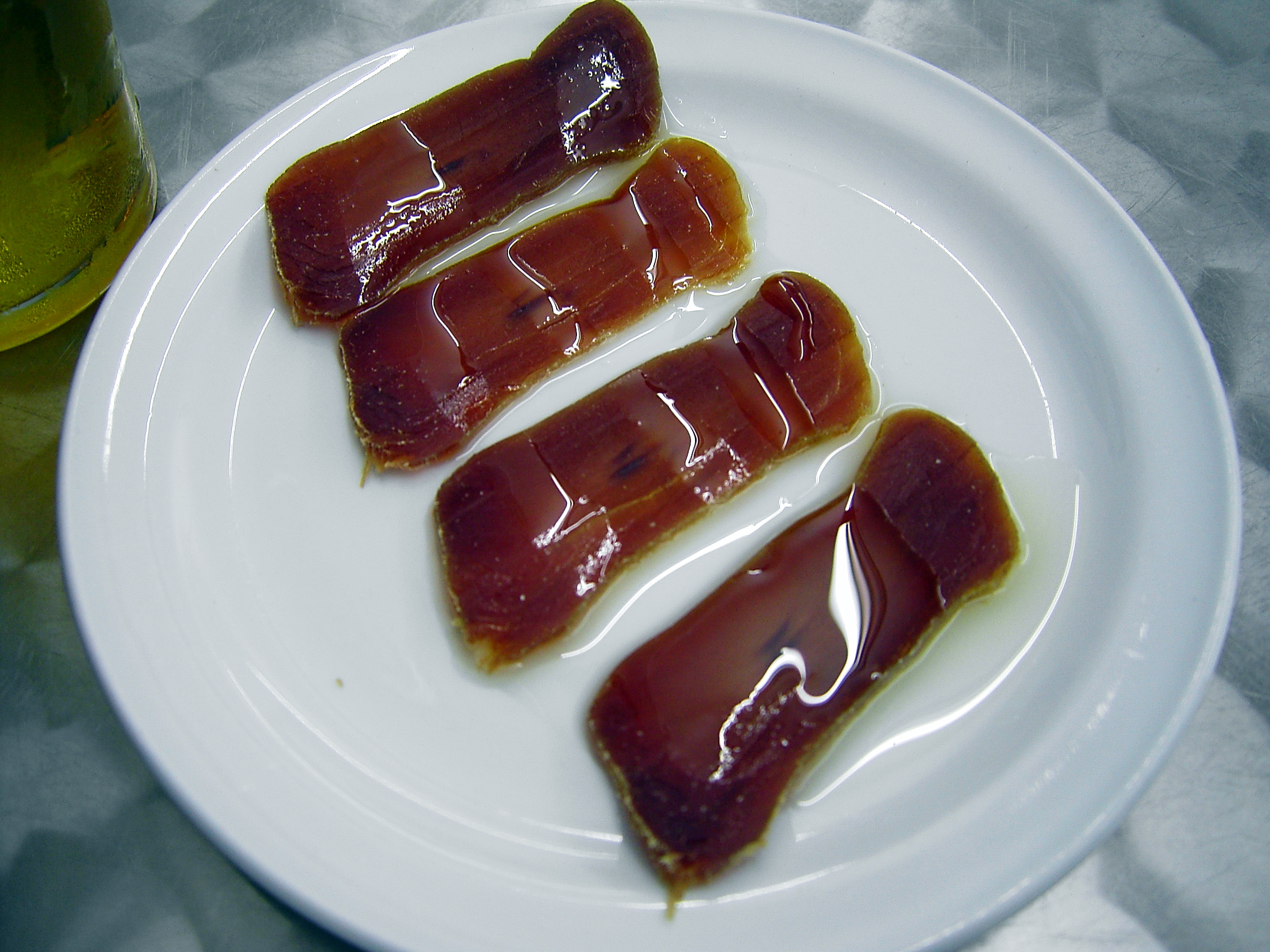
Mojama

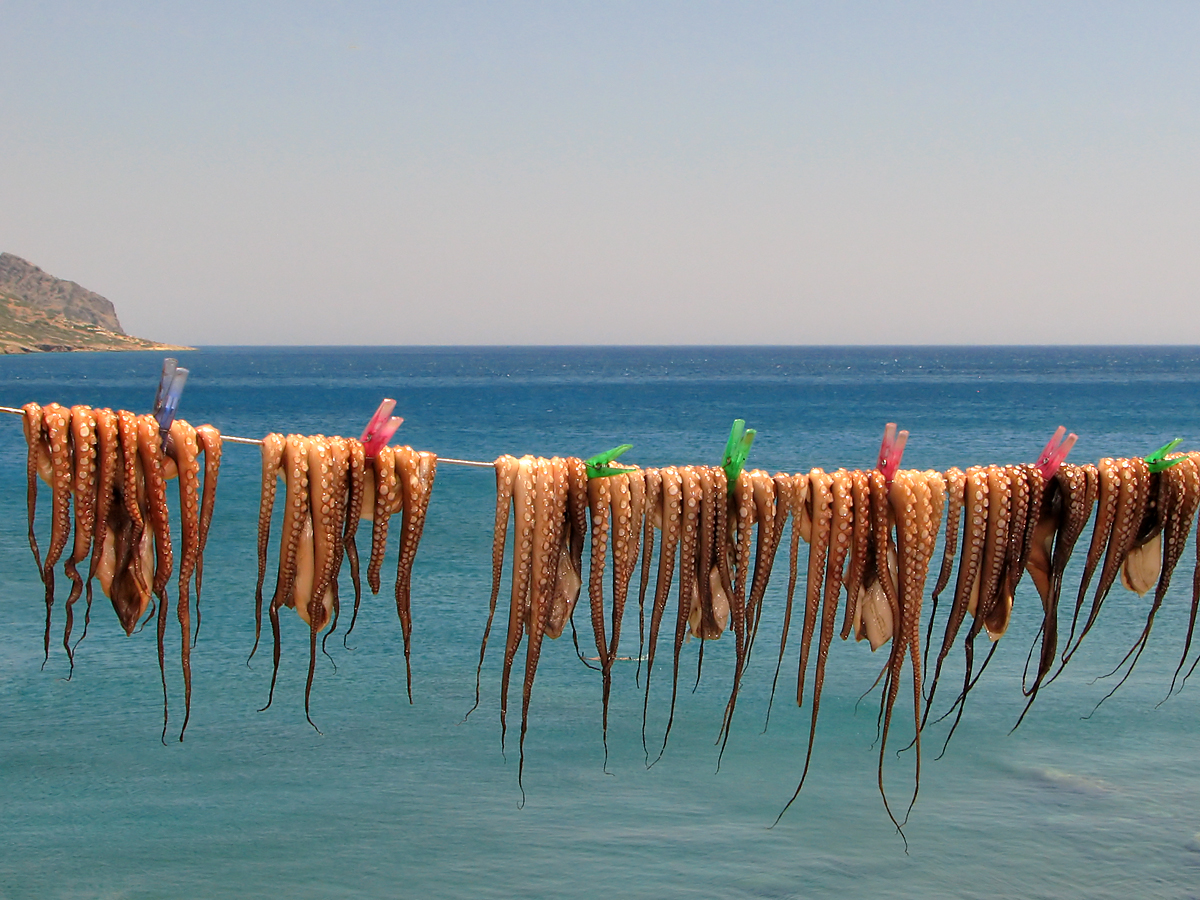
Octopus being sun-dried in Greece

==== P ====
- Piracuí – known in the Brazilian Amazon region as "farinha de peixe" (fish meal), it is traditionally made from dried salted fish that is crushed or shredded.
- Prawn cracker – a form of deep fried snack made from Tapioca flour and prawn.

==== S ====
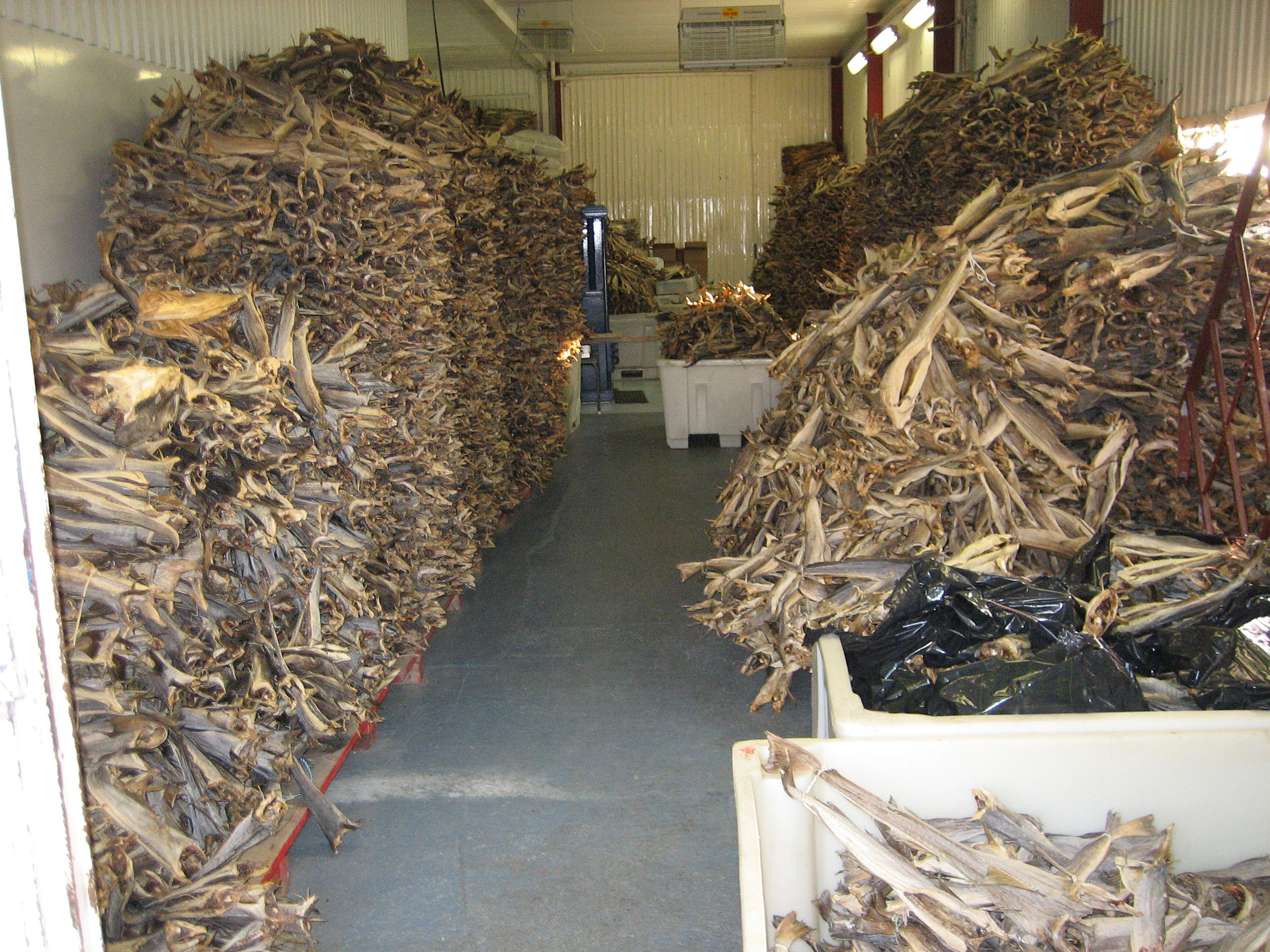
A stockfish warehouse in the village of Forsøl, Norway

- Sanyaa – a type of dried fish prepared by the Newars.
- Dried shrimp – shrimp that have been sun-dried and shrunk. They are used in many Asian cuisines, imparting a unique umami taste.
- Shũṭki (শুঁটকি) or Shũṭki machh (শুঁটকি মাছ) – sun-dried fish or shrimp as prepared in Bengali and Assamese cuisine in India and Bangladeshi cuisine in general. In Western India it's colloquially called Bombay Duck. Dried fish is also used in some parts of South India and Sri Lanka
- Dried shredded squid – a dried, seasoned, seafood product, made from squid or cuttlefish, commonly found in coastal Asian countries, Russia, and Hawaii.
- Stockfish – unsalted fish, especially cod, dried by cold air and wind on wooden racks on the foreshore, called "hjell".

==== T ====
- Tatami iwashi – a Japanese processed food product made from baby sardines or shirasu laid out and dried while entwined in a single layer to form a large mat-like sheet.

==== V ====
- Vobla – salt-dried vobla is a common Russian meal or snack that goes well with beer. It is popular in many Russian households and beer restaurants.
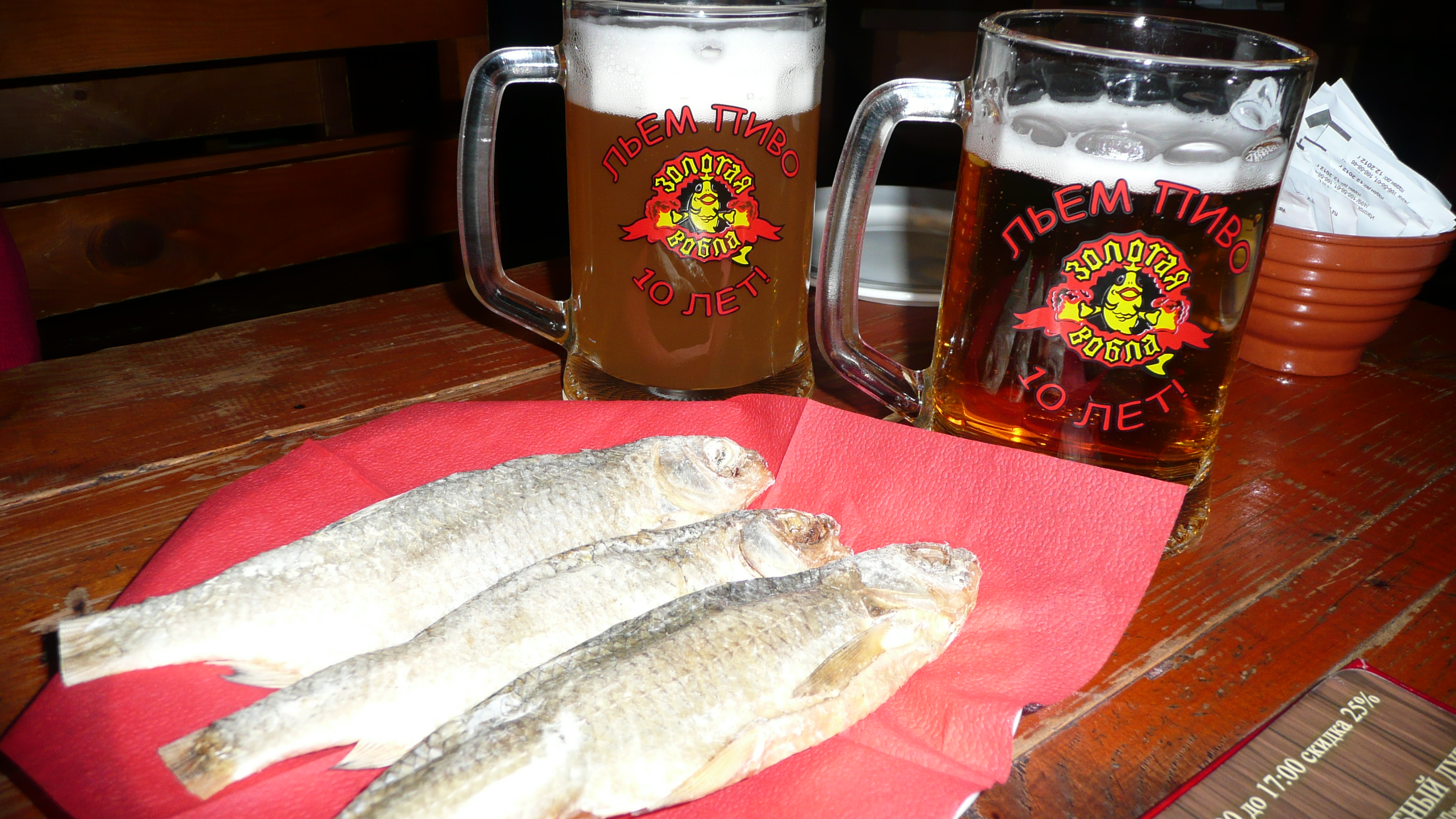
Salt-dried vobla, served with beer

=== Dried meats ===
Dried meat is a feature of many cuisines around the world.

==== A ====
- Aliya - a Luo people traditional food. It consists of thin slices of meat that is cured with salt for preservation. The process of preparation traditionally involves drying in the sun.
- Apohtin – a traditional Cypriot dried food made of salted goat meat.

==== B ====
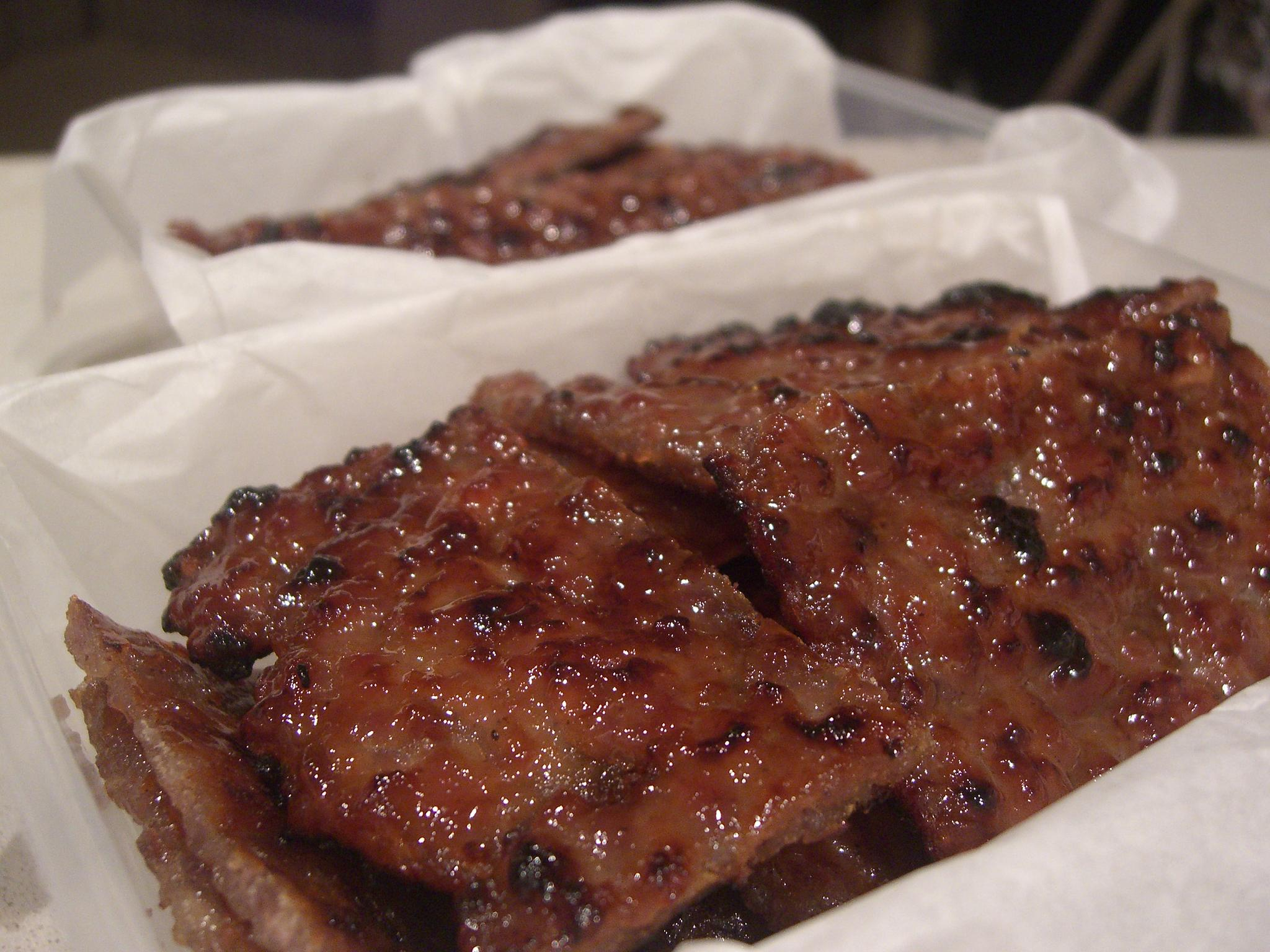
Chinese bakkwa (sweet meat jerky) made from pork

- Bacon – some forms of bacon are dried, such as freeze-dried bacon.
- Bakkwa – a Chinese salty-sweet dried meat product similar to jerky. Bakkwa is made with a meat preservation and preparation technique originating from China.
- Bayonne ham – an air dried salted ham that takes its name from the ancient port city of Bayonne in the far South West of France, a city located in both the cultural regions of Basque Country and Gascony. Jambon de Bayonne has PGI status. It is a slightly sweet, delicately flavored meat with little salt to the taste.
- Biltong – a variety of cured meat that originated in Southern Africa, various types of meat are used to produce it, ranging from beef and game meats to fillets of ostrich from commercial farms. It is typically made from raw fillets of meat.
- Black Forest ham – a variety of dry-cured smoked ham, a pork product, produced in the Black Forest region of Germany. Ham is the thigh and rump from the haunch of a pig or boar. It is the best-selling smoked ham in Europe.
- Borts – a Mongolian air-dried meat with preparation involving cutting the meat into long strips which are hung in the shade.
- Bresaola – air-dried, salted beef that has been aged two or three months until it becomes hard and turns a dark red, almost purple color. It is made from top (inside) round, and is lean and tender, with a sweet, musty smell. It originated in Valtellina, a valley in the Alps of northern Italy's Lombardy region.
- Brési – beef which has been salted, dried and smoked over a period of three months, which is made in the Department of Doubs. It resembles Grisons Buendnerfleisch, and first appears in works on gastronomy from about 1560.
- Bündnerfleisch – an air-dried meat that is produced in the canton of Graubünden, Switzerland, The main ingredient is beef, taken from the animal's upper thigh or shoulder, the fat and the sinews being removed. Before drying, the meat is treated with white wine and seasonings such as salt, onion and assorted herbs.
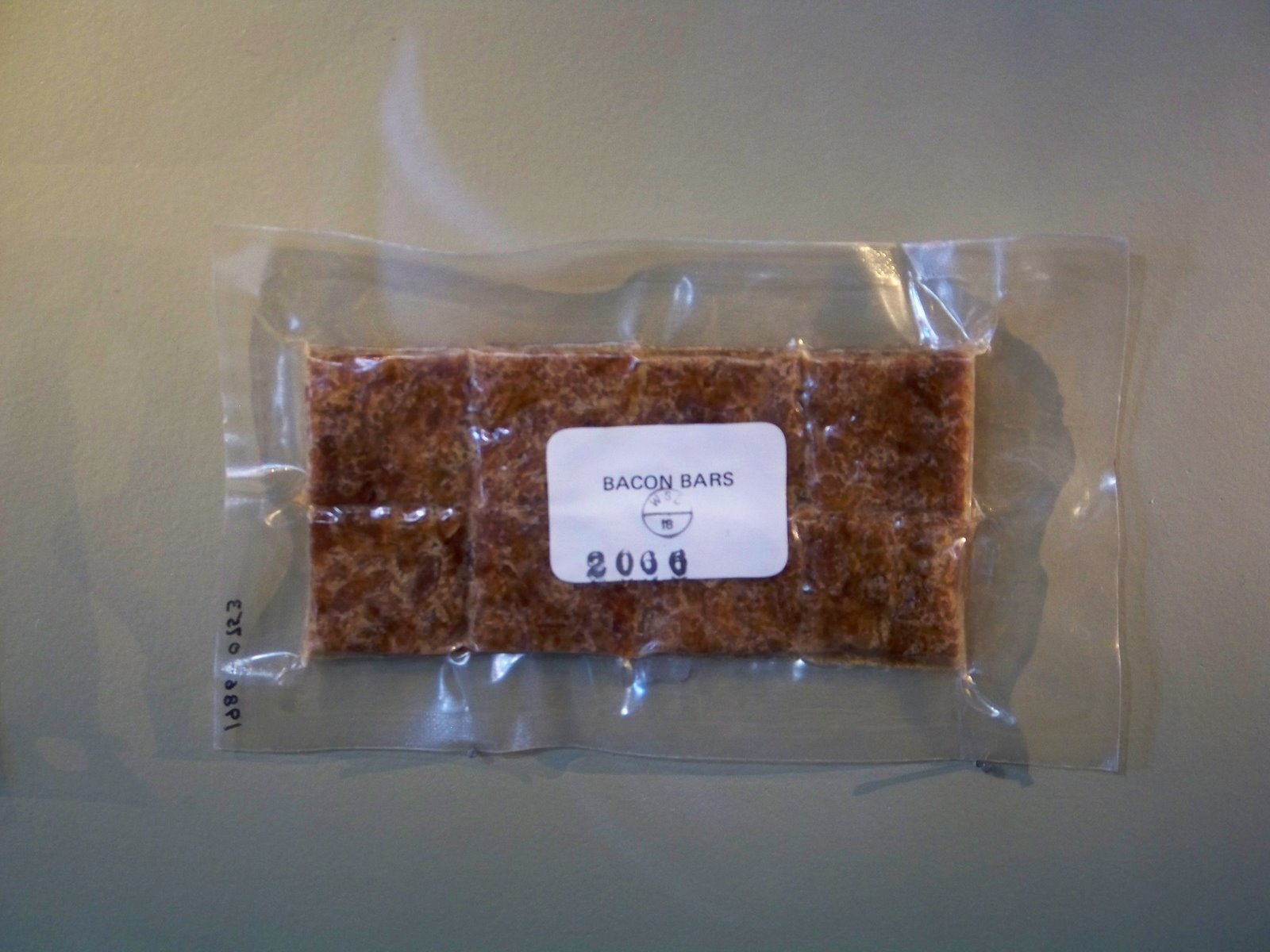
freeze-dried bacon bars

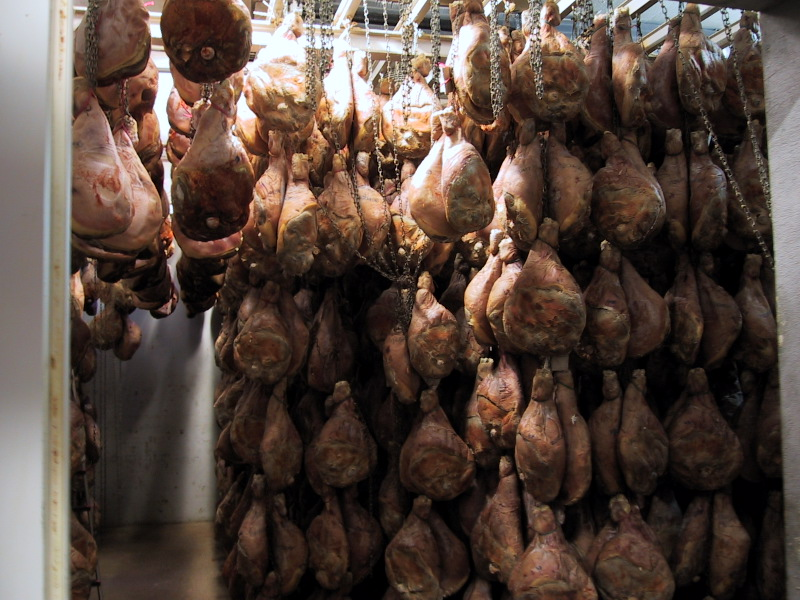
Bayonne hams aging in an atmospherically controlled storage room in Mazerolles, Béarn

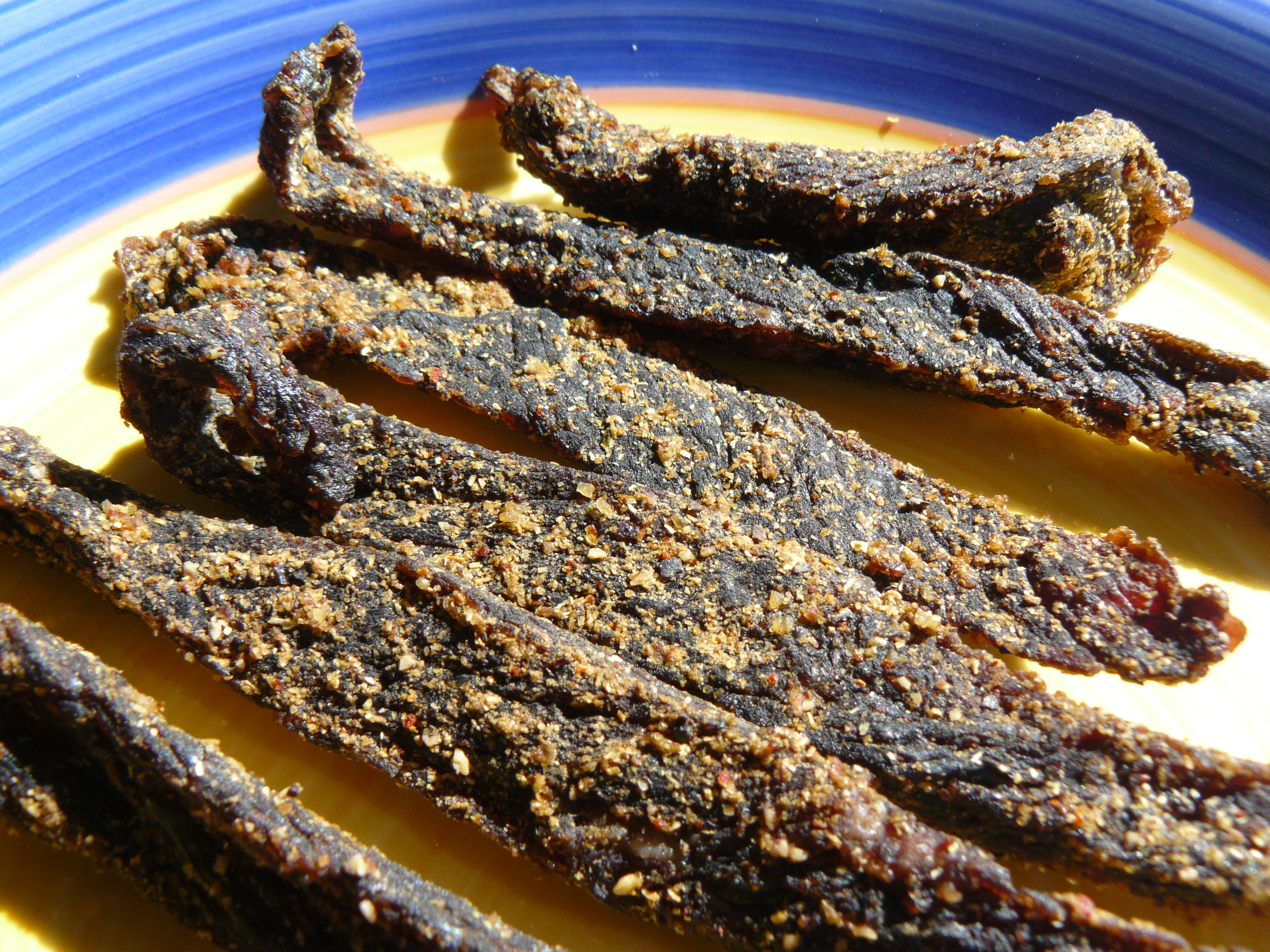
Homemade beef biltong sticks

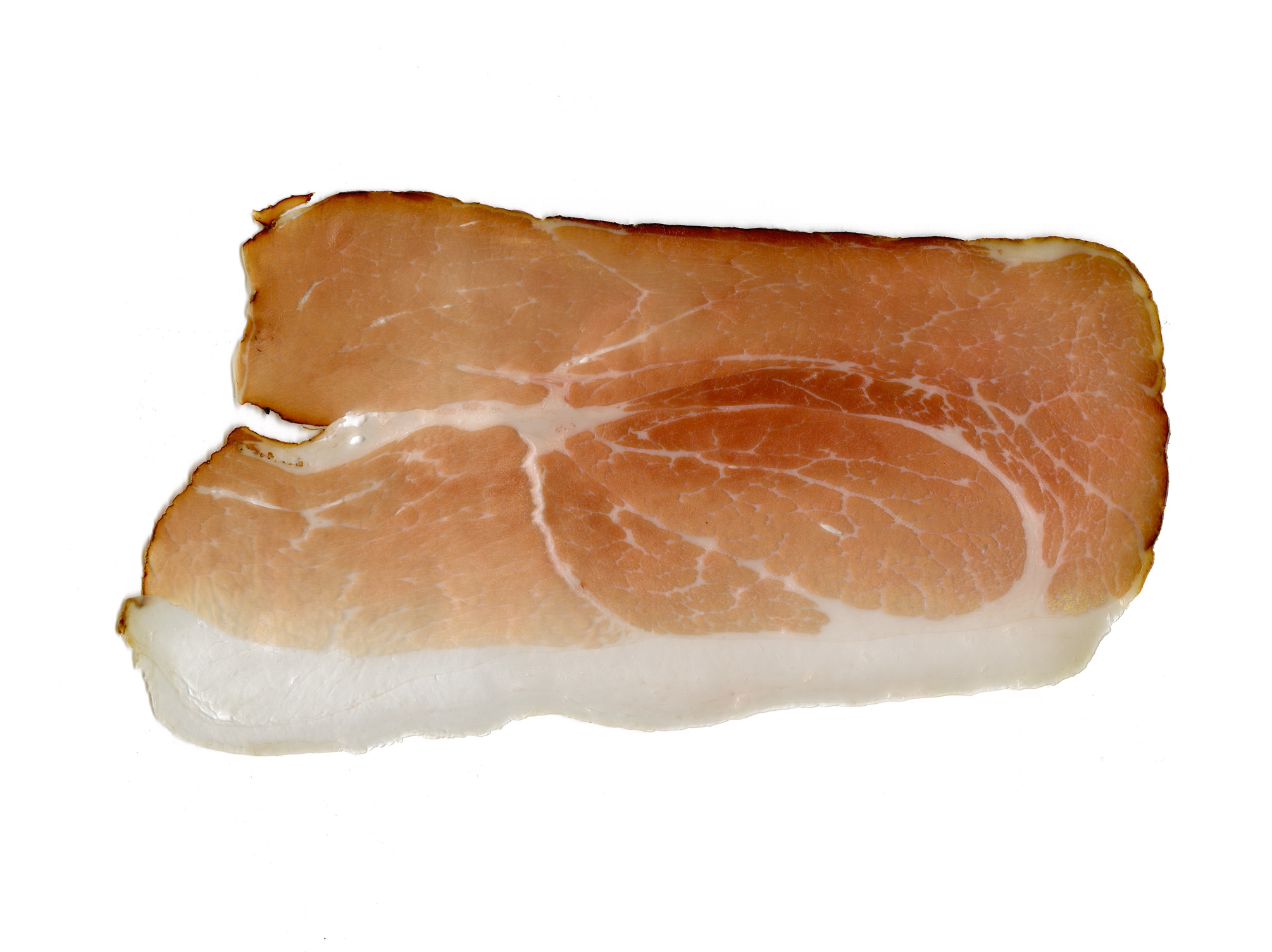
Sliced Black Forest ham

==== C ====
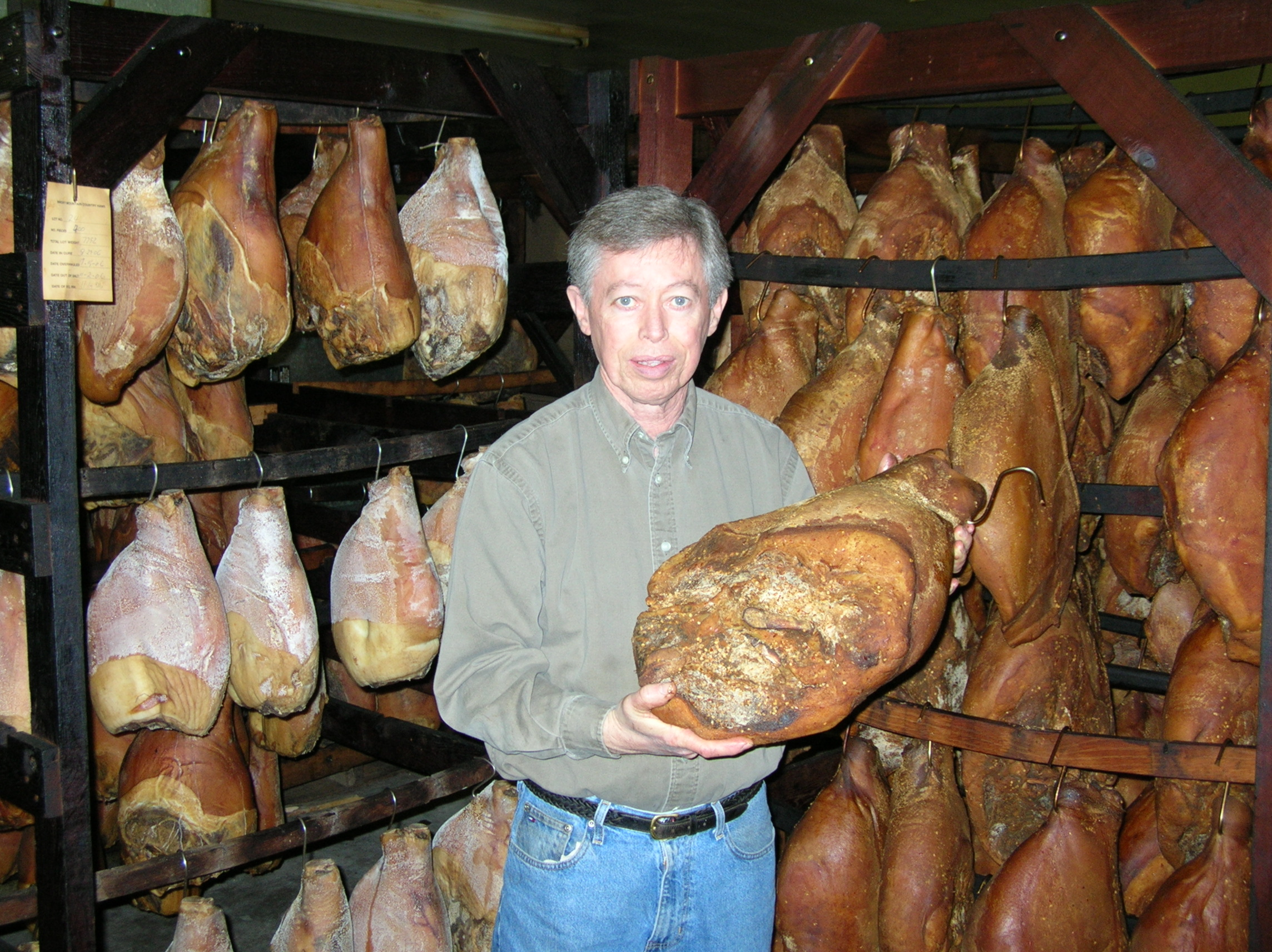
Country ham aging on racks

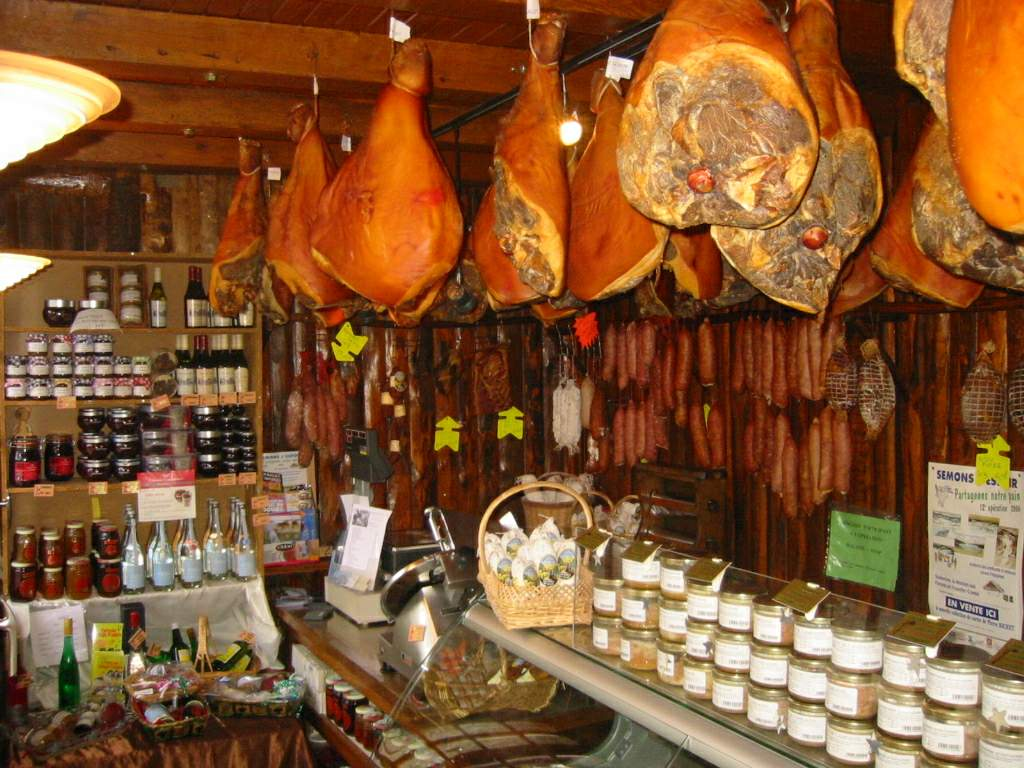
Charcuterie in Jura, France

- Kabanos – a type of dry sausage, similar to a mild salami. It is made from pork and beef, lightly seasoned and then smoked.
- Capicola – a traditional Italian cold cut (salume) made from dry-cured whole pork shoulder or neck. Two particular varieties have Protected Designation of Origin (PDO) status under the Common Agricultural Policy of European Union law. Four additional Italian regions produce capocollo, and are not covered under European law, but are designated as Prodotti agroalimentari tradizionali (P.A.T.) by the Italian Ministry of Agricultural, Food and Forestry Policies.
- Carne-de-sol – a dish from Northeastern Brazil. It consists of heavily salted beef, which is exposed to the sun for one or two days to cure.
- Carne seca – a kind of dried beef in Mexican cuisine. In northern Mexican cuisine, particularly the states of Chihuahua and Sonora, carne seca is cooked in a dish called machaca.
- Carne-seca – a kind of dried, salted meat, usually beef, in Brazilian cuisine, a frequent accompaniment to black beans.
- Cecina – in Spanish, cecina means "meat that has been salted and dried by means of air, sun or smoke". The word comes either from the Latin siccus (dry) or from the Celtic ciercina related to modern Spanish cierzo or northern wind. In Spain, cecina is similar to ham but is made by curing beef, horse or (less frequently) goat, rabbit, or hare. Cecina de León, which is made of the hind legs of beef, salted, smoked and air-dried in the province of León in northwestern Spain, has Protected designation of origin status.
- Charcuterie – the branch of cooking devoted to prepared meat products, such as bacon, ham, sausage, terrines, galantines, pâtés, and confit, primarily from pork. Charcuterie is part of the garde manger chef's repertoire. Originally intended as a way to preserve meat before the advent of refrigeration, they are prepared today for their flavors derived from the preservation processes.
- Charque – a form of jerky common in South America made from dried and salted meat, originally llama where this animal roamed, but nowadays mostly beef.
- Chinese sausage – a generic term referring to the many different types of sausages originating in China.
- Chipped beef – thinly sliced or pressed salted and dried beef. Some varieties are smoked to add flavor.
- Chorizo – can be a fresh sausage, in which case it must be cooked before eating. In Europe, it is more frequently a fermented, salt-cured, smoked sausage
- Cold cut – precooked or cured meat, including dried sausages.
- Country ham – a variety of cured ham that is typically very salty. Country hams are salt-cured (and occasionally nitrite- and nitrate-cured) for one to three months.
- Culatello – a refined variety of prosciutto, made from heavier pigs, cut to a fraction of the normal prosciutto and aged, and may be cured with wine, with culatello di Zibello having PDO status.
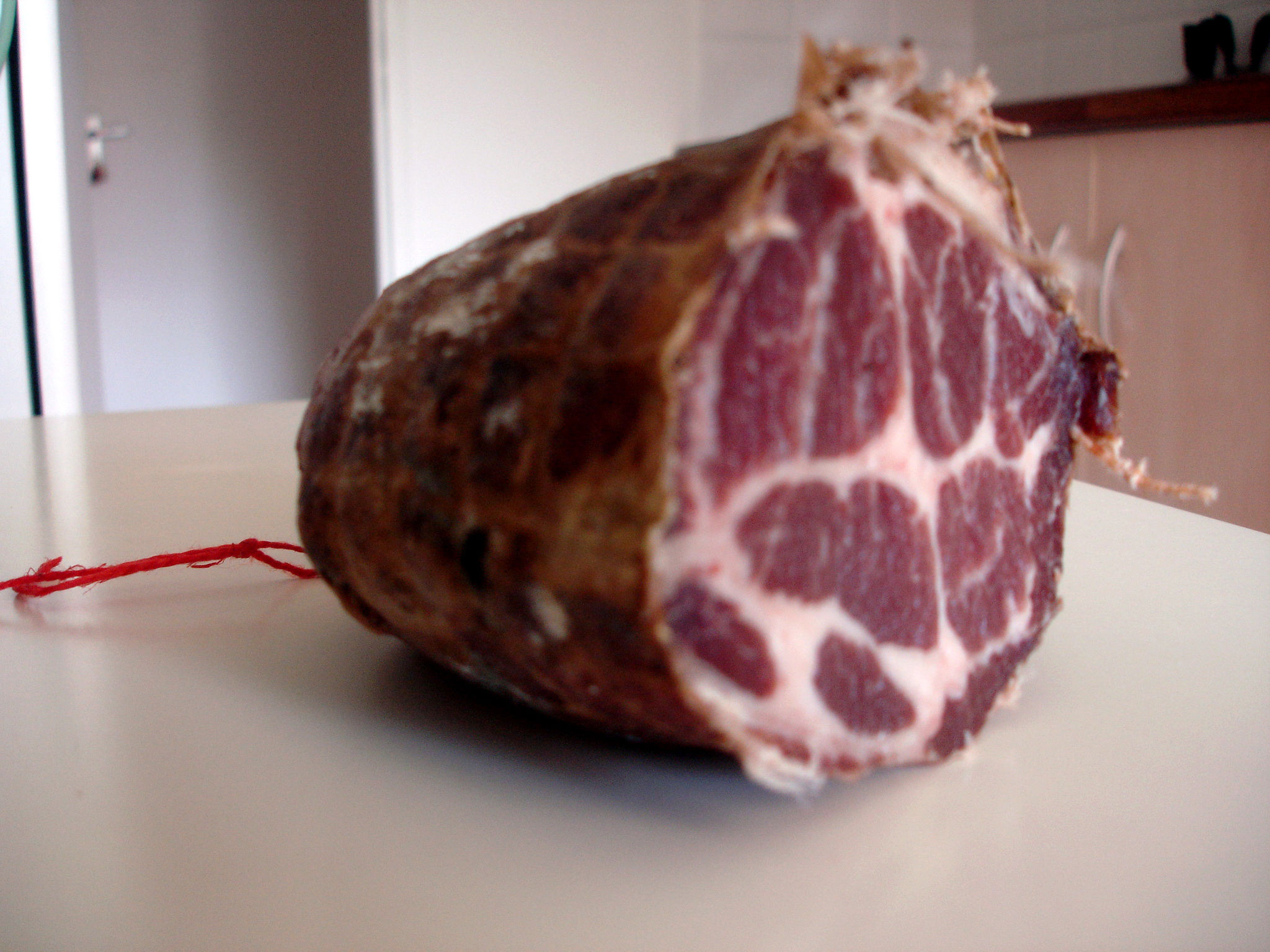
Coppa Spécialité Corse, a variety of capicola

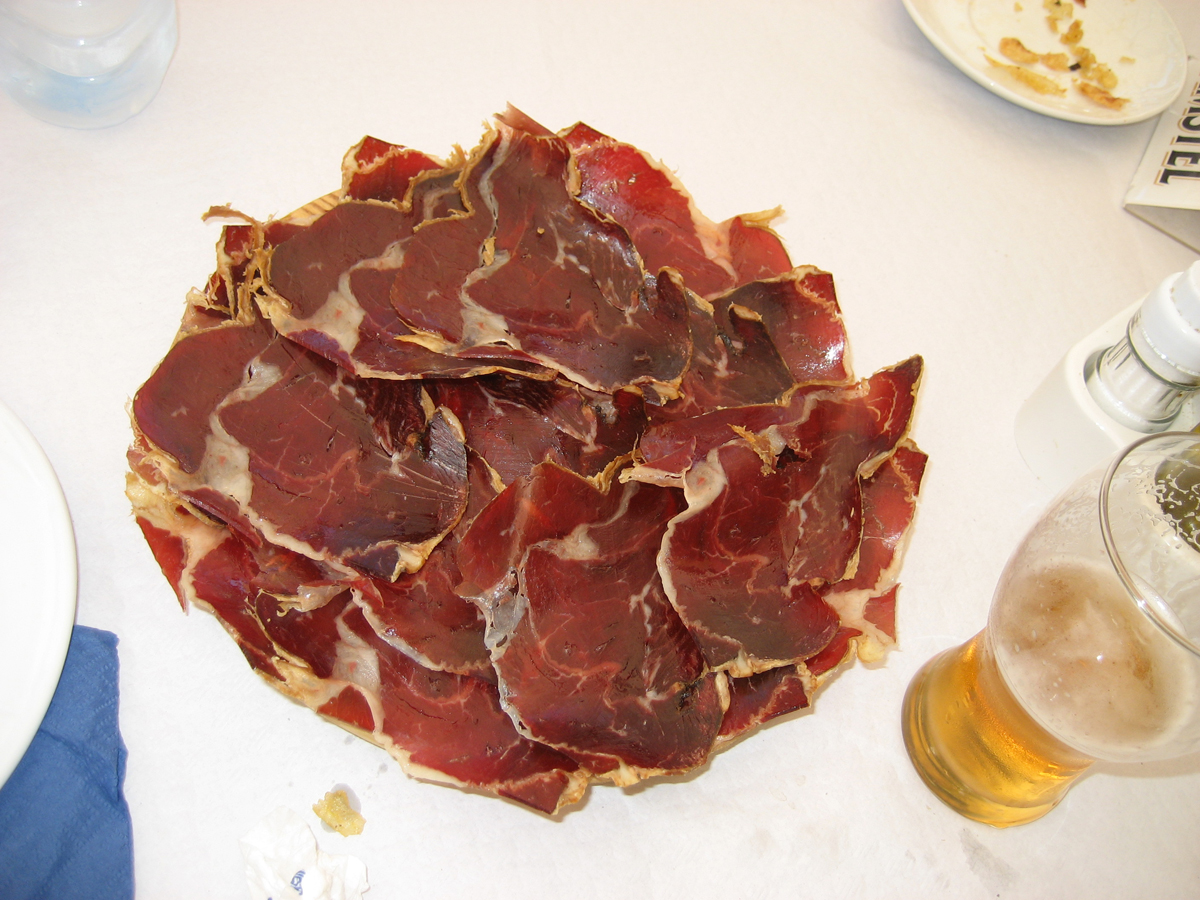
Cecina

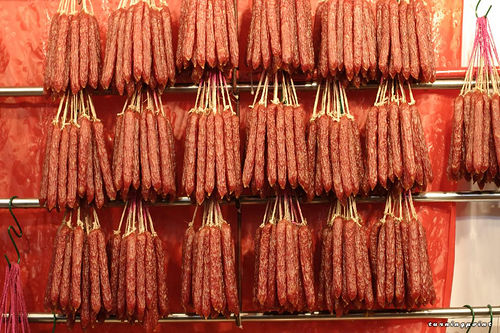
Dried Chinese sausages

==== D ====
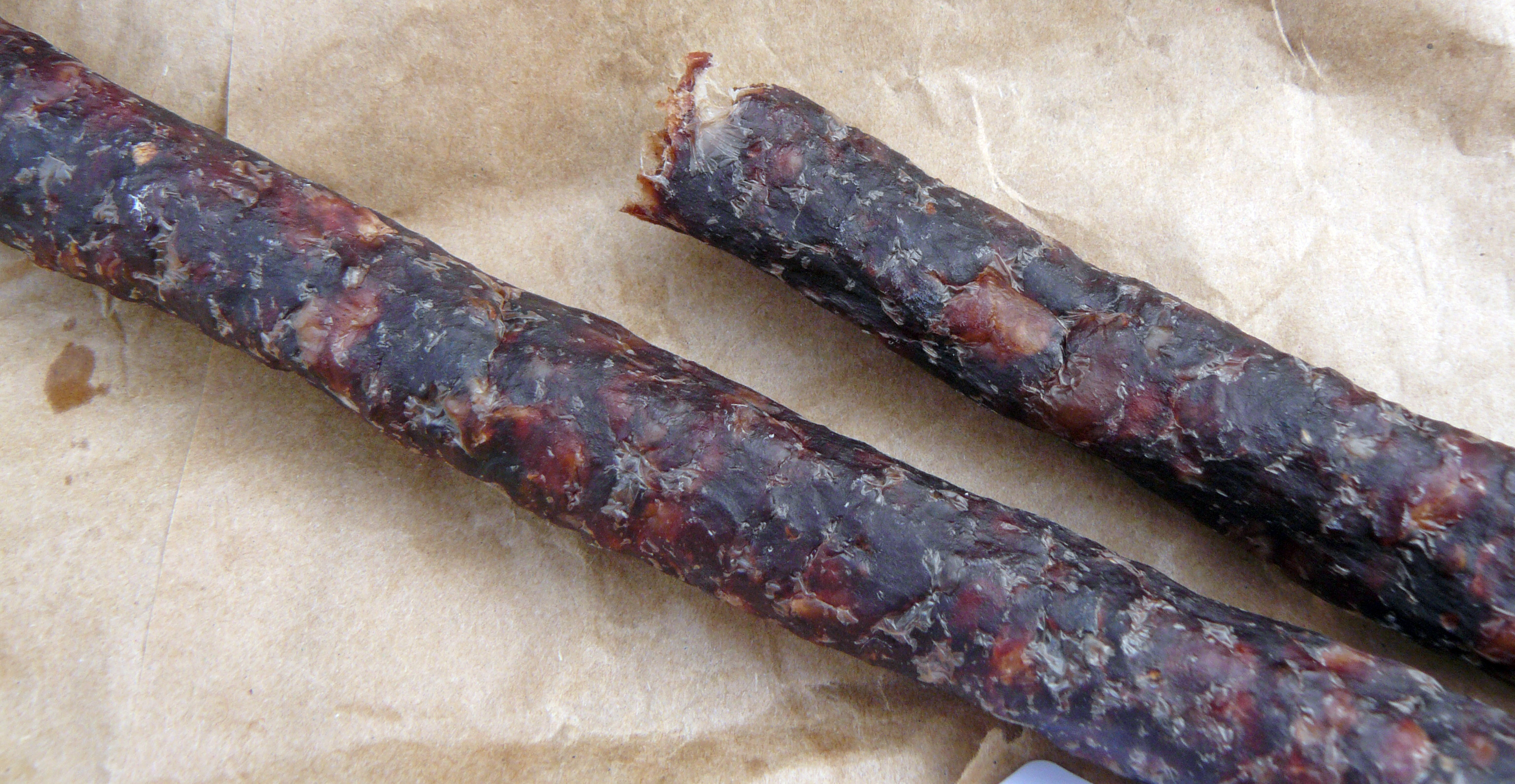
Droëwors pieces

- Droëwors – a Southern African snack food, based on the traditional, coriander-seed spiced boerewors sausage.
- Droge worst, Dutch snack food
- Dambu nama, Northern Nigerian dried meat floss, made with beef and chicken

==== E ====
- Elenski but – a dry-cured ham from the town of Elena in northern Bulgaria and a popular delicacy throughout the country. The meat has a specific taste and can be preserved in the course of several years, owing much to the special process of making and the climatic conditions of the part of Stara Planina where Elena is located.

==== F ====
- Fenalår – in Norway, salted, dried and cured leg of lamb. Curing time is normally about three months, but the "fenalår" may be matured for a year or more. The meat is dark red to brownish, with a pronounced taste of mutton. Fenalår is a very popular dish in Norway, and is often served with other preserved food at a Christmas buffet or at Norwegian Constitution Day. Normally the meat is served as thin slices, but it is also common – at informal gatherings – to send the leg around the table with a sharp, stubby knife. The guests then slice the leg themselves. Thus, in western Norway "fenalår" is called "spikkekjøtt", literally "whittle-meat", but this name may also origin from the word "speke", "to cure".

==== G ====
- Genoa salami – an American variety of salami commonly believed to have originated in the area of Genoa. It is normally made from pork, but may also contain beef or be all beef. It is seasoned with garlic, salt, black and white peppercorns, fennel seeds, and red or white wine.

==== H ====
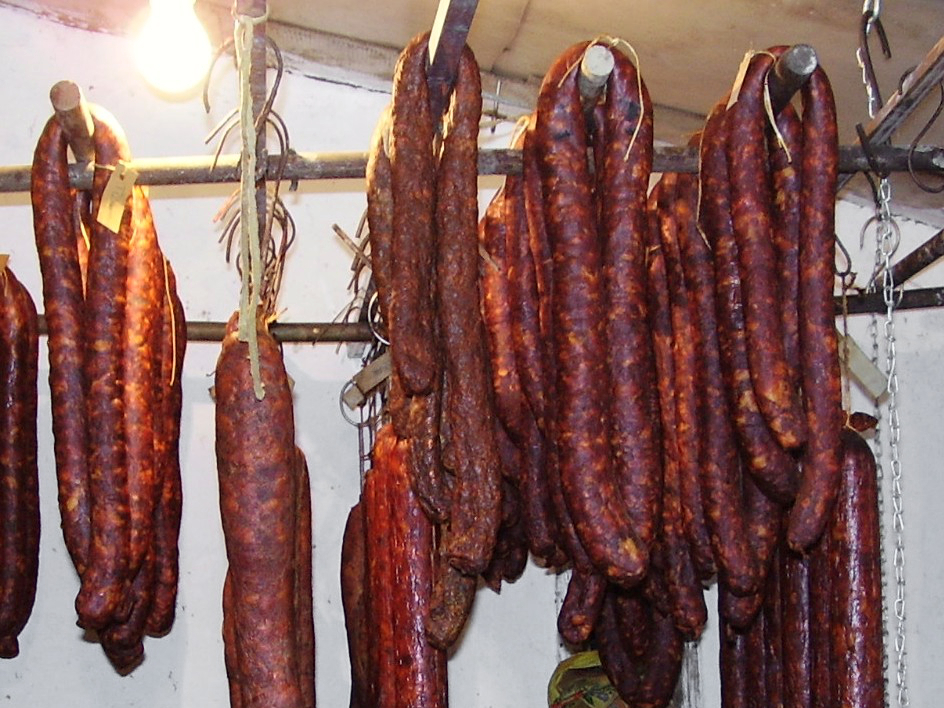
Csabai kolbász, a type of Hungarian sausage

- Hungarian sausages – the cuisine of Hungary produces a vast number of types of sausages. Different regions in Hungary may have their own sausage recipes and tastes. The Hungarian sausages may be boiled, fresh or dried and smoked, with different spices and flavors, "hot" or "mild".

==== J ====
- Jamón ibérico – "Iberian ham" (also called pata negra and carna negra; "black hoof") is an expensive variety of Jamón made out of black Iberian pigs, produced mostly in Spain, but also in some Portuguese regions where it is called presunto ibérico.
- Jamón serrano or simply Jamón – a type dry-cured ham from Spain, which is generally served in thin slices, or occasionally diced. One of the most famous foods of the Spanish cuisine. When produced from Iberian pork is commercially labeled jamón ibérico.
- Jerky – lean meat that has been trimmed of fat, cut into strips, and then dried to prevent spoilage. Normally, this drying includes the addition of salt, to prevent bacteria from developing on the meat before sufficient moisture has been removed. Modern manufactured jerky is normally marinated in a seasoned spice rub or liquid, and dried, dehydrated or smoked with low heat (usually under 70 °C/160 °F).
- Jinhua ham – a type of dry-cured ham named after the city of Jinhua, where it is produced, in the Zhejiang province of eastern China. The ham is used in Chinese cuisines to flavour stewed and braised foods as well as for making the stocks and broths of many Chinese soups.
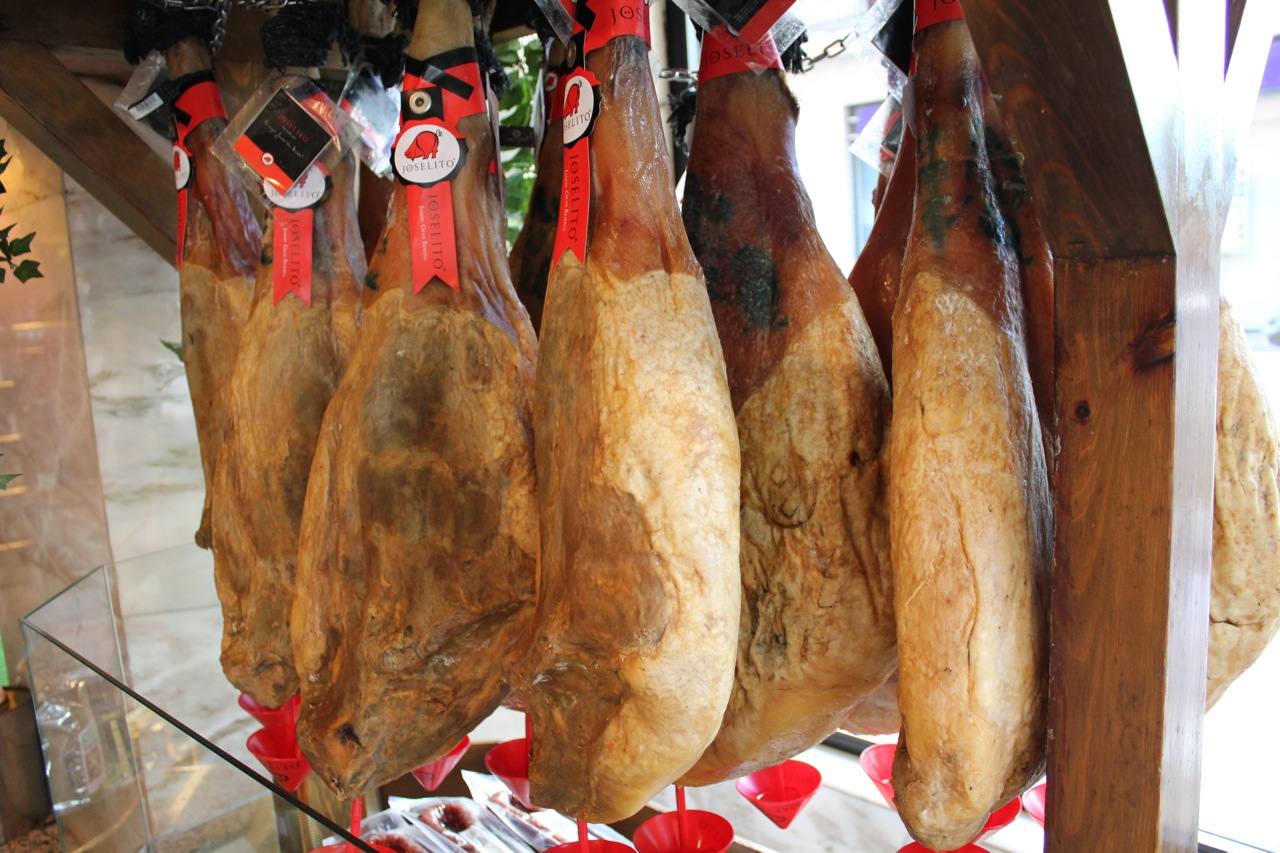
Jamón serrano

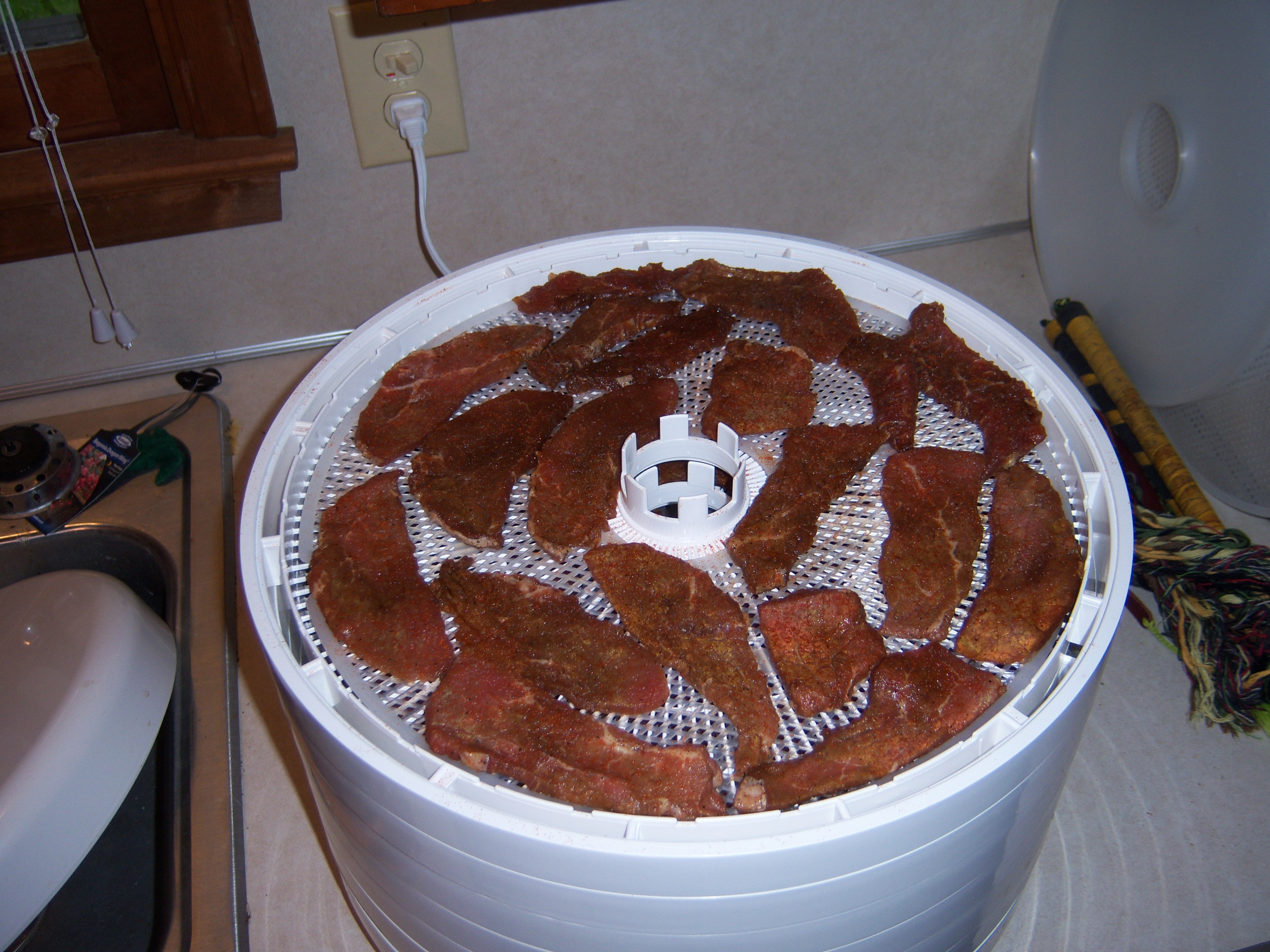
Raw meat before dehydration into jerky

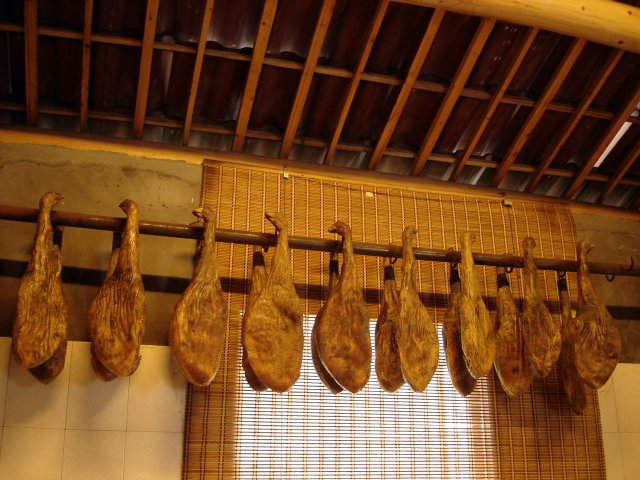
Jinhua ham

==== K ====
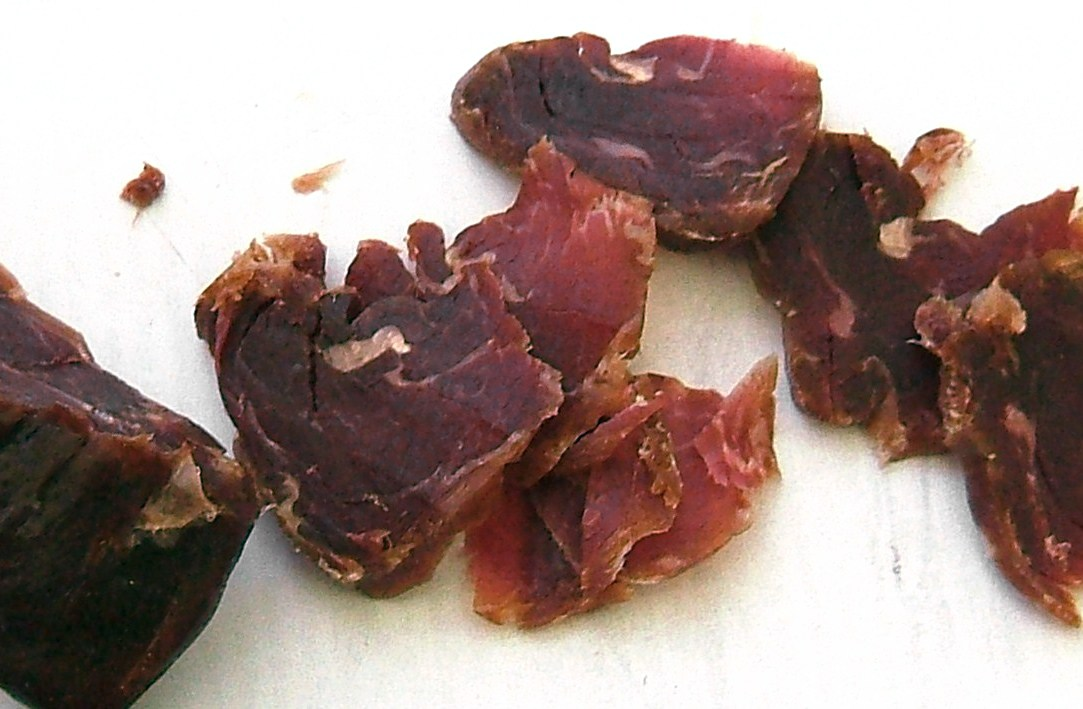
Kuivaliha, in the form of dried reindeer meat

- Kilishi – a version of biltong or jerky that originated in Hausaland, it is a delicacy made from cow, sheep or goat meat after the removal of bone.
- Kuivaliha – salted and dried meat, often reindeer meat, is a traditional food and a delicacy of northern Finland, prepared at springtime.
- Kulen – a kind of highly spiced, semi-dried, smoked, cured sausage from Croatia (Slavonia) and Serbia (Vojvodina). The meat undergoes fermentation-curing as well as the air-drying.

==== L ====
- Lacón Gallego – a dried ham product from Galicia, Spain with PGI status under European law. Historically, Lacón has been mentioned in texts since at least the 17th century. Only specific breeds of pigs are used to produce the food, and the actual product is only made with the pork shoulder.
- Lahndi – a winter food popular in Northern Afghanistan, that is usually prepared from lamb and sheep, although it can also be made from beef.
- Lomo embuchado – a dry-cured meat made from a pork tenderloin. It is similar to cecina, but with pork instead of beef.
- Lountza – a meat delicacy of Cyprus of dried, smoked pork tenderloin.

==== M ====
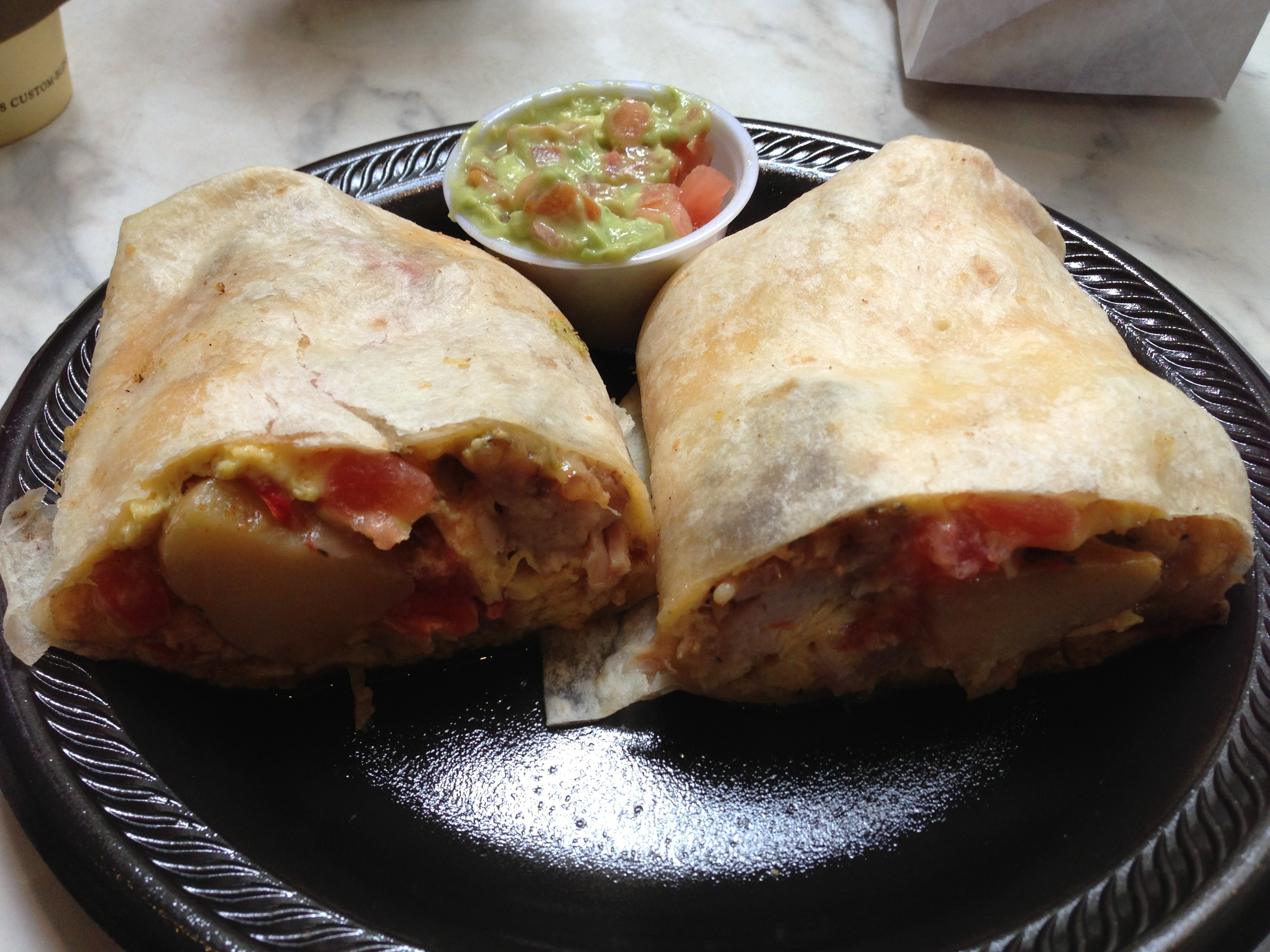
Pork machaca; eggs and potatoes wrapped in a tortilla, served with salsa

- Machaca – a dish prepared most commonly from dried, spiced beef or pork, then rehydrated and pounded to make it tender. The reconstituted meat would then be used to prepare any number of dishes.
- Meat extract – highly concentrated meat stock, usually made from beef. It is used to add meat flavor in cooking, and to make broth for drinking. Meat extracts have largely been supplanted by bouillon cubes and yeast extract.

==== N ====
- Njeguška pršuta – a specialty of Njeguši, a village in Montenegro, Njeguška pršuta is a dry-cured ham, served uncooked, similar to Italian prosciutto. It has a unique flavor that is attributed to the result of the mixture of sea and mountain air and wood burned during the drying process.

==== P ====
Pastırma being chipped, in Kastamonu, Turkey

- Pancetta – Italian bacon is pork belly meat that is salt cured and contains peppercorns. Associated with Italy, pancetta varies by region. It is often cubed, as lardon. It is also produced in Spain.
- Pastirma – a highly seasoned, air-dried cured beef of Anatolian origin, which is now part of the cuisines of the former Ottoman countries.
- Pastrami – a popular delicatessen meat usually made from beef in Romania, and also from pork and mutton. Like corned beef, pastrami was originally created as a way to preserve meat before modern refrigeration.
- Pemmican – a historic food, pemmican is a concentrated mixture of fat and protein used as a nutritious food.
- Pepperoni – an American variety of salami, usually made from cured pork and beef. Pepperoni is characteristically soft, slightly smoky, and bright red in color.
- Pinnekjøtt – in Norway, a main course dinner dish of lamb or mutton, its preparation uses a traditional method for food preservation utilizing curing, drying and in some regions also smoking.
- Pitina – an Italian cold cut with origin in the mountain valleys of Tramonti di Sopra and River Cellina of the province of Pordenone in northeastern Italy.
- Presunto – the name given to dry-cured ham from Portugal. Many varieties exist.
- Prosciutto – a dry-cured ham that is usually thinly sliced and served uncooked; this style is called prosciutto crudo in Italian and is distinguished from cooked ham, prosciutto cotto.
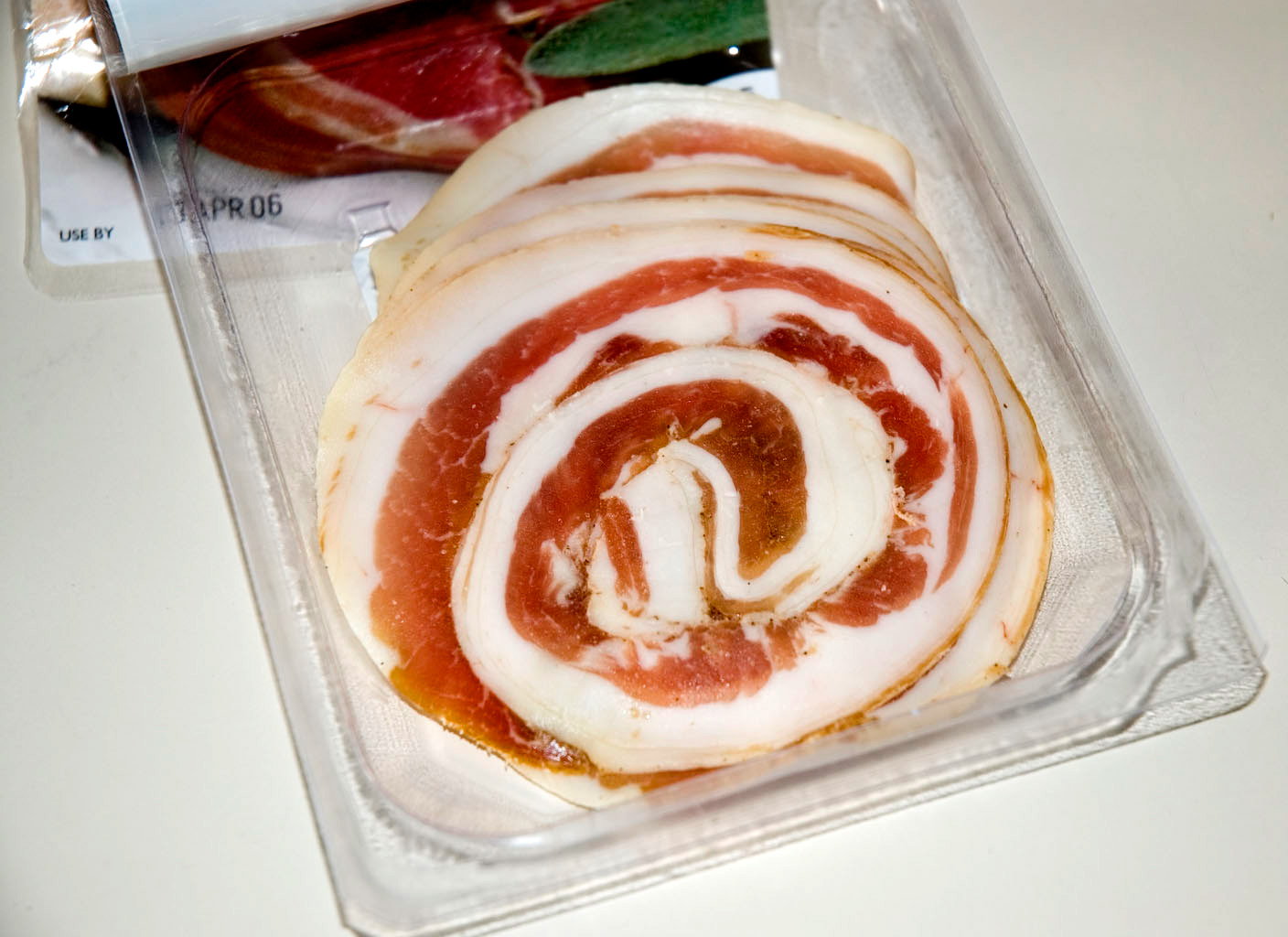
Packaged pancetta

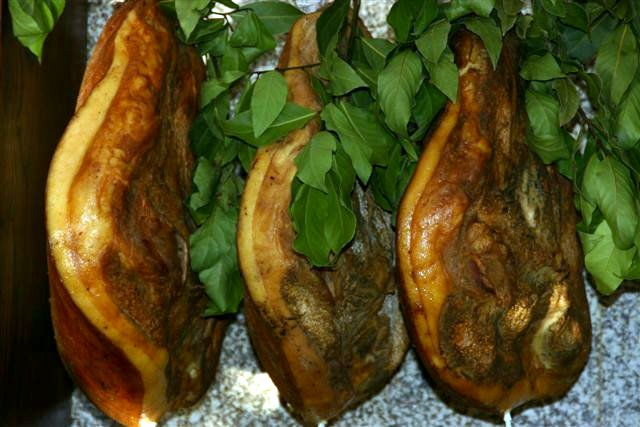
Presunto of Chaves

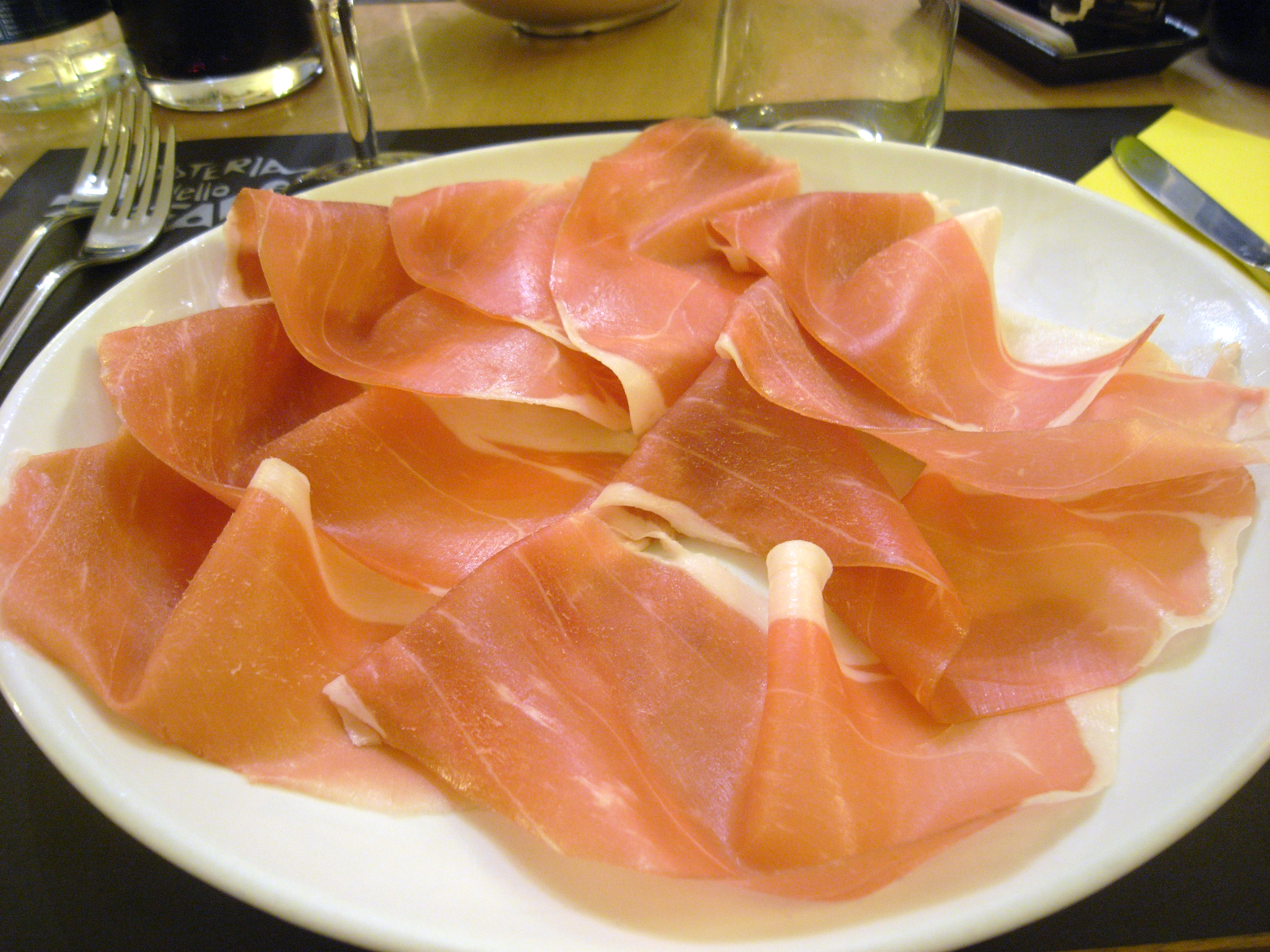
Prosciutto di Parma

==== R ====
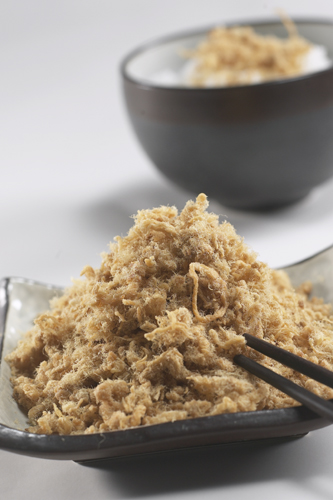
Rousong

- Rauchfleisch – German term for meat preserved by salting and cold smoking, used for Austrian and Bavarian cuisine
- Rousong – a dried meat product with a light and fluffy texture similar to coarse cotton, originating from Fujian, China. It also spread to Taiwan. Rousong is used as a topping for many foods, such as congee, tofu, and savory soy milk.
- Rukuri – A traditional cured meat that originated from Central Kenya which is similar to jerky. It is prepared using thin slices of meat that are cured with honey as a method of preserving it. The meat has a specific taste and can be preserved in the course of several years owing to the special process of making it.

==== S ====
- Salami – cured sausage, fermented and air-dried meat, originating from one or a variety of animals. Historically, salami was popular among Southern European peasants because it can be stored at room temperature for periods of up to 30–40 days once cut, supplementing a possibly meager or inconsistent supply of fresh meat. Varieties of salami are traditionally made across Europe.
- Salumi – Italian cured meat products that are predominantly made from pork. It comes from the Italian word salume, pl. salumi "salted meat", derived from Latin sal "salt". The term salumi also encompasses bresaola, which is made from beef, and also cooked products such as mortadella and prosciutto cotto.
- Secca de bœuf – a type of dried salted beef made in Entrevaux. Similar to the Swiss Bindenfleisch, it is typically eaten as a starter.
- Skerpikjøt – a type of wind-dried mutton, is a delicacy of the Faroe Islands which is traditionally eaten at Christmas but also at other times of the year.
- Slinzega – a type of air-dried meat produced in Valtellina, in the Italian Alps. It is made in a similar manner to Bresaola, with smaller pieces of meat, which therefore bear a stronger taste.
- Smithfield ham – a specific form of the country ham, A 1926 Statute of Virginia (passed by the Virginia General Assembly) first regulated the usage of the term "Smithfield Ham". Smithfield hams are a specific variety of country hams which are cured by the long-cure, dry salt method and aged for a minimum period of six months within the limits of the town of Smithfield, Virginia, United States
- Soppressata – an Italian dry salami. Two principal types are made, a cured dry sausage typical of Basilicata, Apulia and Calabria, and a very different uncured salami, native to Tuscany and Liguria.
- Speck – in parts of the English-speaking culinary world, the term "Speck" refers to Italian Speck, a type of prosciutto. Speck is also an English word meaning "fat" or "blubber", attested since the early 17th century.
- Suho meso – a smoked beef food preparation eaten in Bosnian cuisine and Serbian cuisine.
- Sukuti – the Nepali word for dry meat (jerky). Sukuti is either consumed directly or charbroiled and spiced as an appetizer or snack or mixed with other ingredients and served as side dish.
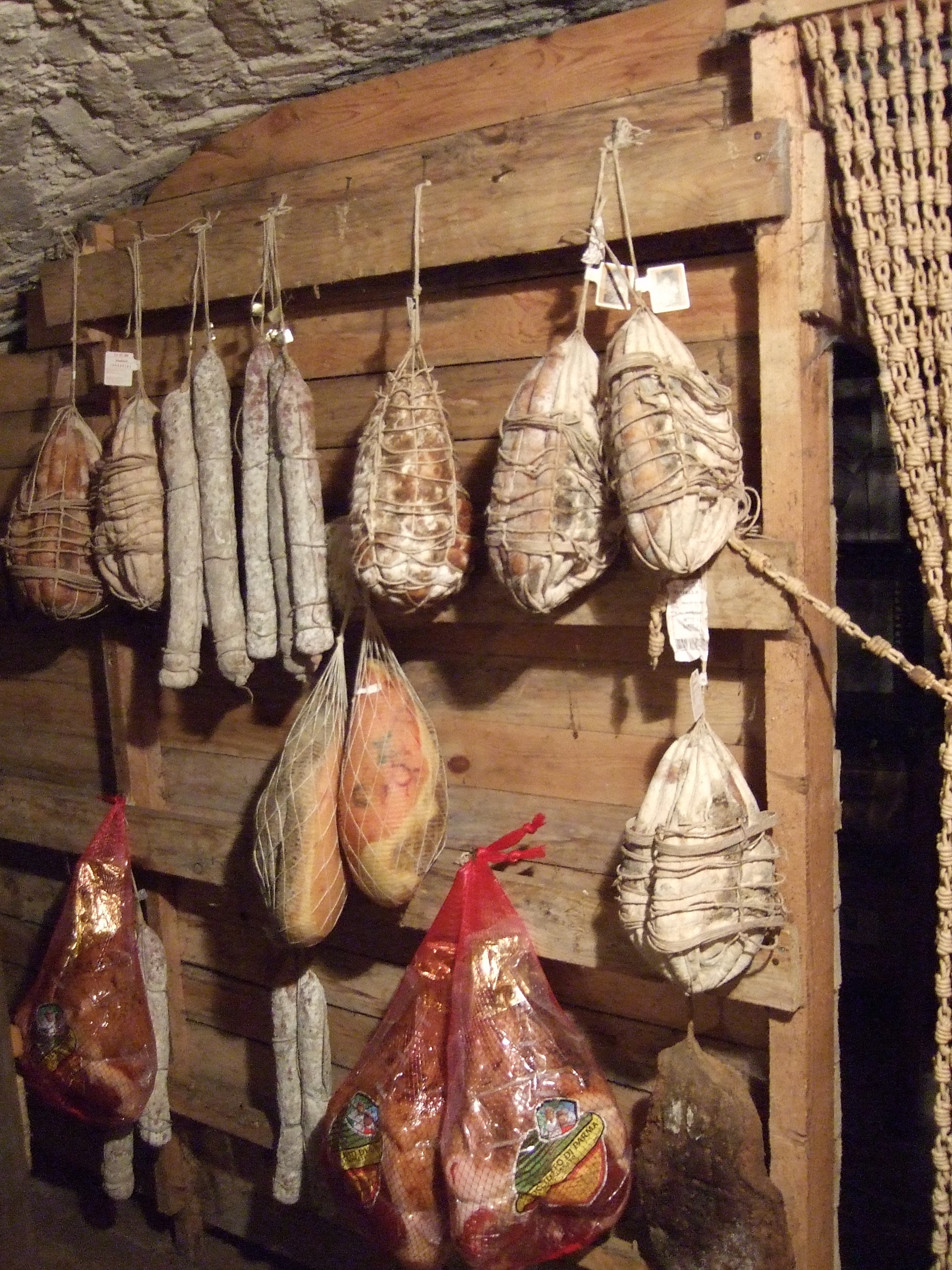
Aging salumi

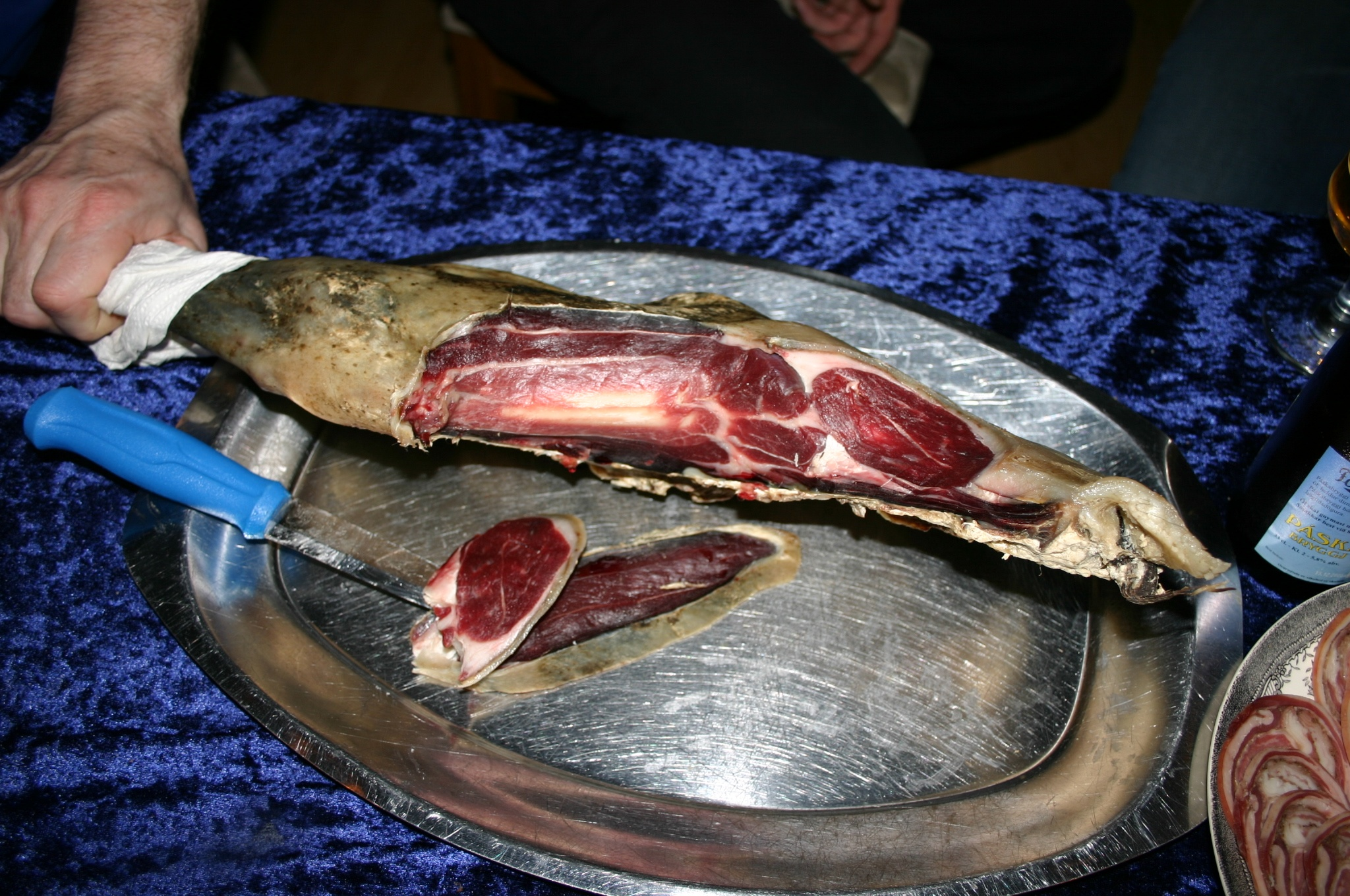
Skerpikjøt is dried mutton, and is a typical food in the Faroe Islands.

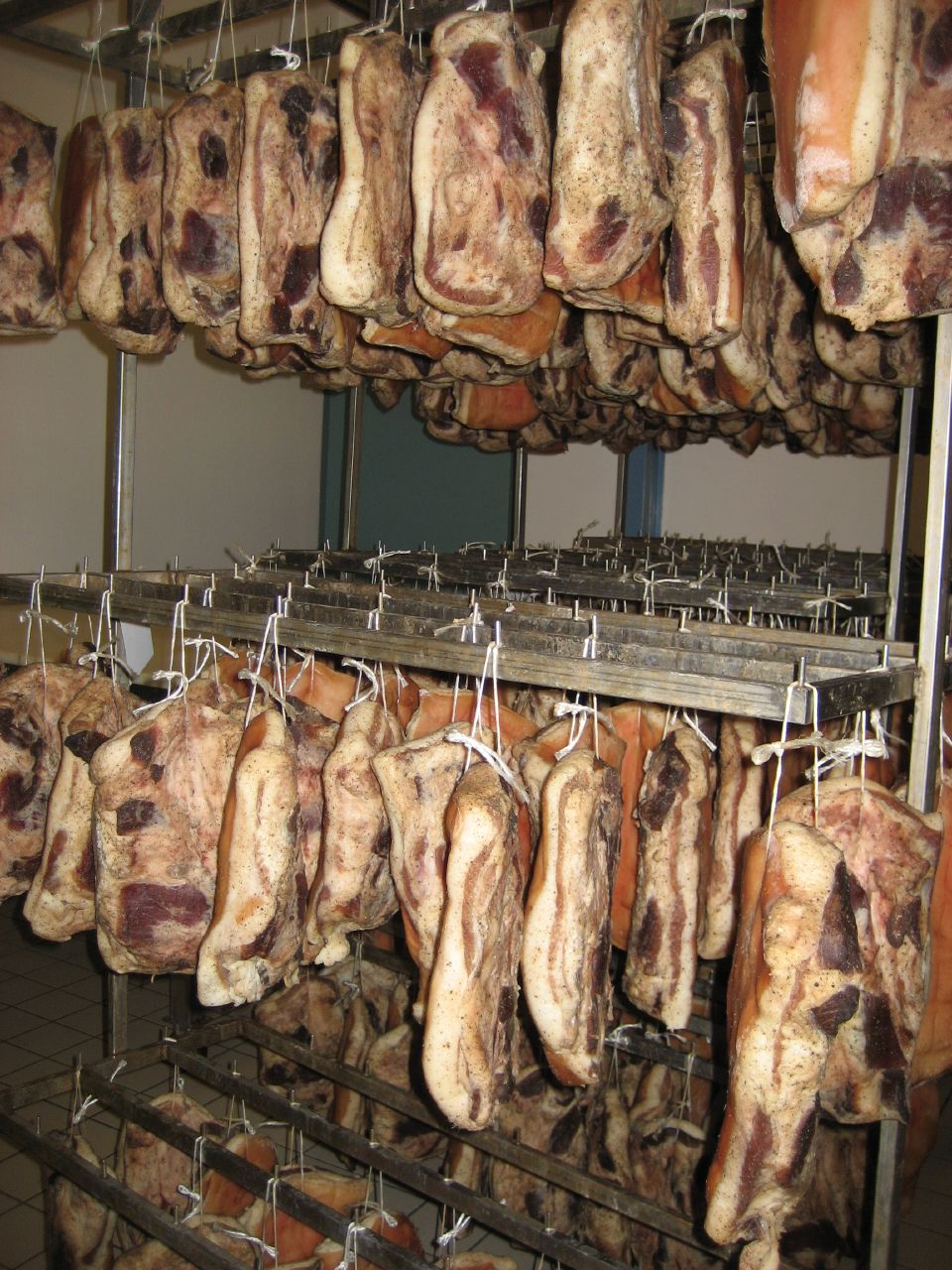
Smoked speck

==== T ====
- Tapa – a Philippine food made dried or cured beef, mutton or venison, although other meats or even fish may be used. It is prepared using thin slices of meat that are cured with salt and spices as a method of preserving it.
- Tolkusha
- Tsamarella – a Cypriot traditional food. It consists of meat, usually goat meat, that is salted and cured for preservation. The process of preparation traditionally involves drying in the sun.
- Tyrolean Speck – a distinctively juniper-flavored ham originally from Tyrol, an historical region that since 1918 partially lies in Italy. Tyrolean speck is made from the hind leg of the pig, and is deboned before curing in salt and one of various spice combinations, which may include garlic, bay leaves, juniper berries, nutmeg, and other spices. It is then rested for a period of several weeks, after which, the smoking process begins. It is cold-smoked slowly and intermittently for two or three hours a day for a period of roughly a week using woods such as beech at temperatures that never exceed 20 °C (68 °F). It is then matured for five months.

==== W ====
- Winter salami – a type of Hungarian salami based on a centuries-old producing tradition. Made from mangalitsa pork and spices: white pepper, allspice and others. Winter salami is cured in cold air and smoked slowly.
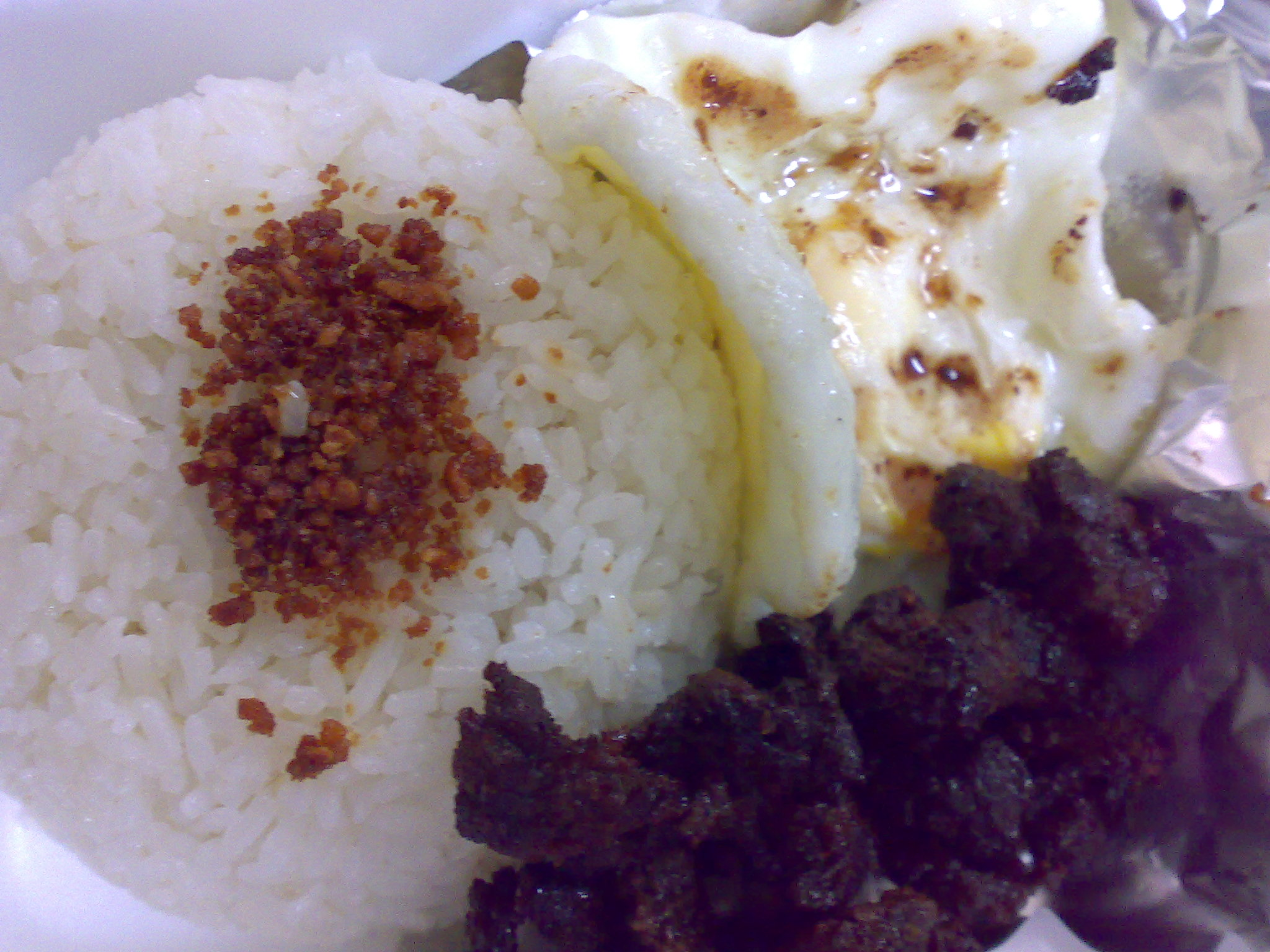
Tapa (at bottom)

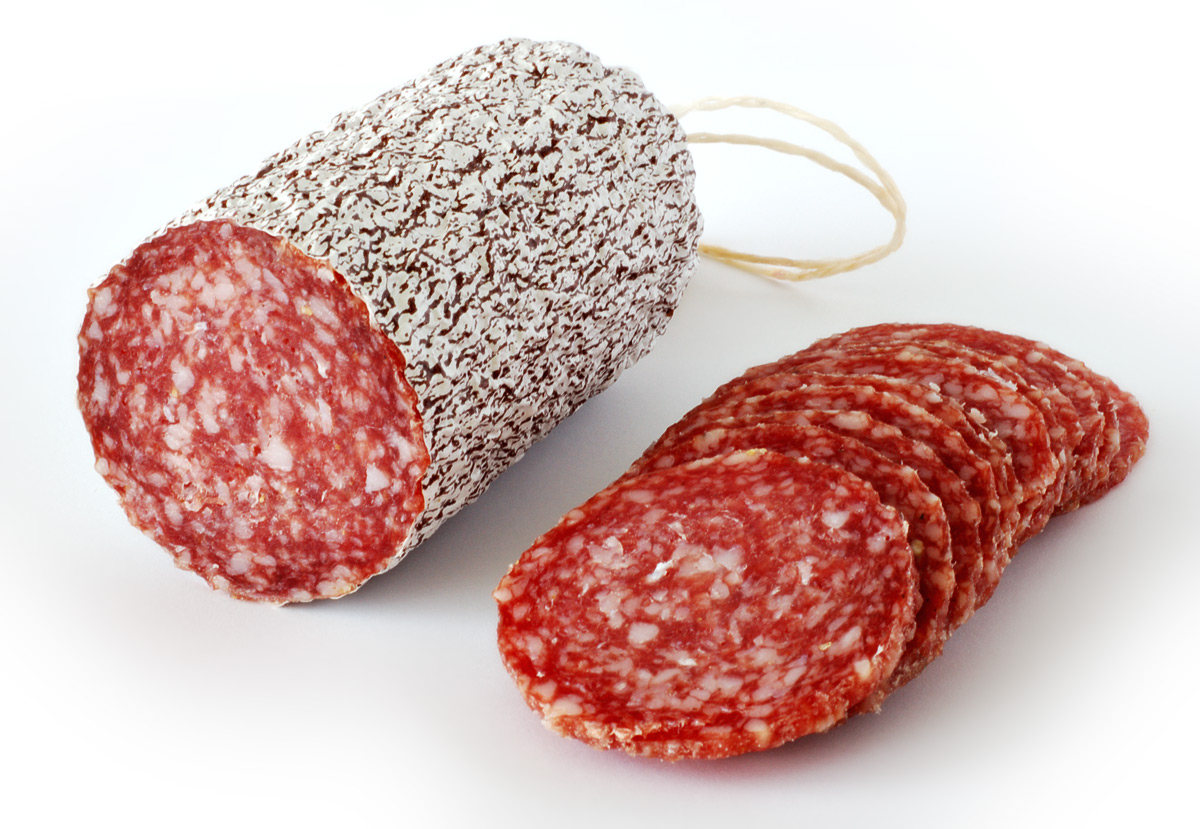
Téliszalámi (winter salami)

== See also ==
- Cuisine
- Cured fish
- Curing
- Curing salt
- Fermented fish
- Food dehydrator
- Food processing
- Freeze-drying
- List of culinary herbs and spices
- List of food origins
- List of hams
- List of instant foods
- List of sausages
- List of smoked foods
- Salting
- Sausage making
- Shrivelling
- Smoked fish
- Smoking
