= Biltong =

Southern African air-dried cured meat

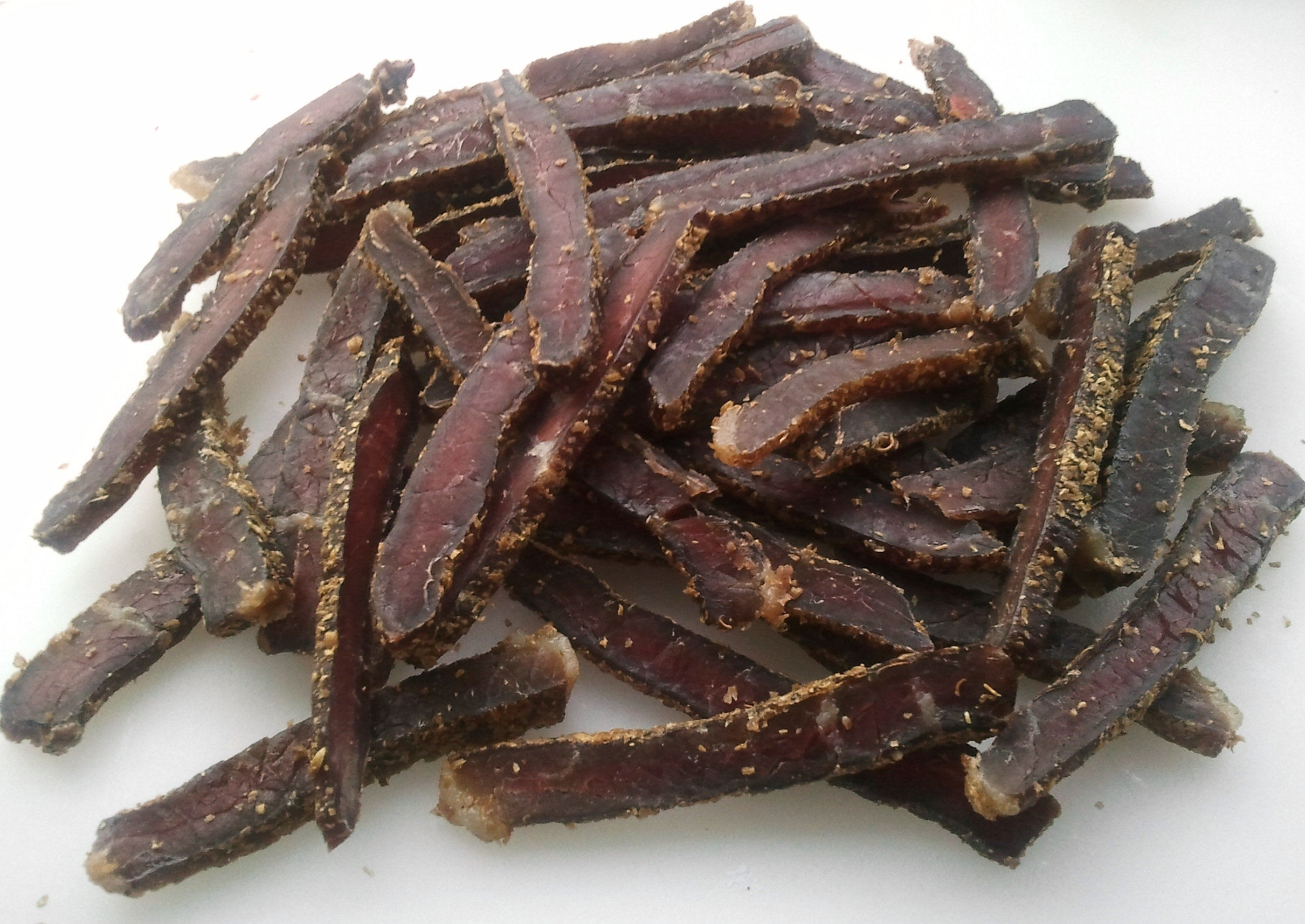
- Sliced beef biltong
- Type: Dried meat
- Place of origin: Southern Africa
- Main ingredients: Meat
- Ingredients generally used: Black pepper; Coriander; Salt; Vinegar

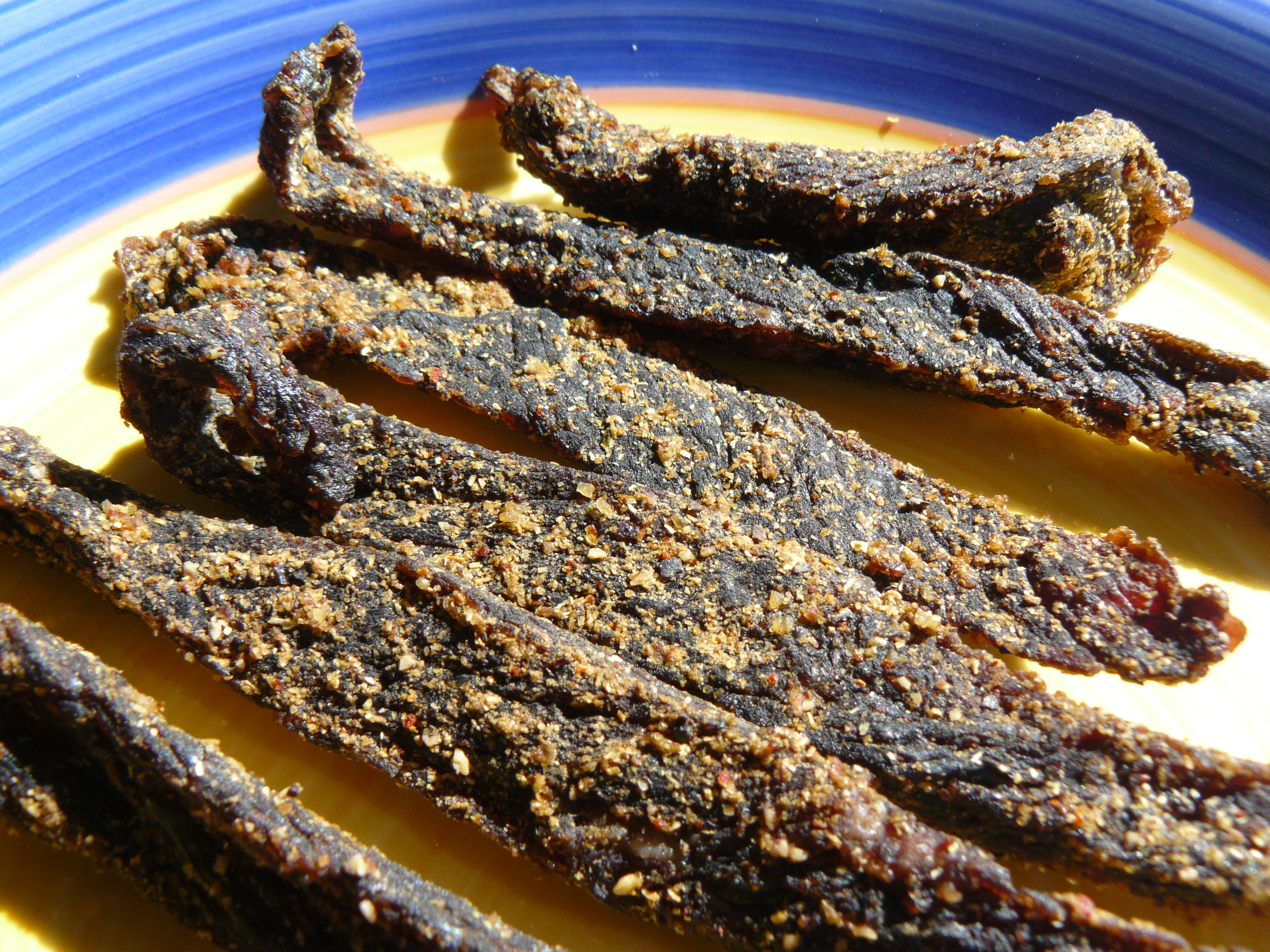
Homemade beef biltong sticks

Biltong is a form of air-dried, cured meat which originated in Southern Africa. Various types of meat are used to produce it, ranging from beef to game meats such as ostrich or kudu. The cut may also vary, being either fillets of meat cut into strips following the grain of the muscle, or flat pieces sliced across the grain. It is related to beef jerky, as both are spiced, dried meats; however, the typical ingredients, taste, and production processes may differ. Biltong is air-dried, which gives it a unique texture and flavor, whereas jerky is heated to at least 71 °C (160 °F).

The word "biltong" is from the Afrikaans bil ("buttock") and tong ("strip" or "tongue").

== Origins and history ==
Meat preservation as a survival technique dates back to ancient times.

Meat can be preserved by curing it in salt, brine, or vinegar as well as saltpetre (potassium nitrate). Potassium nitrate kills Clostridium botulinum, the deadly bacterium that causes botulism, while the acidity of vinegar inhibits its growth. According to the World Health Organization, C. botulinum will not grow in acidic conditions (pH less than 4.6), and so the toxin will not be formed in acidic foods.

The antimicrobial properties of certain spices have also been drawn upon since ancient times. The spices introduced to biltong by the Afrikaners include pepper, coriander, and cloves.

According to local lore, biltong was originally made in the 17th century by Afrikaner pioneers who would place large strips of raw meat under horses' saddles to dry with the horses' salty sweat. This salty sweat preserved the meat while the latter was tenderized by the shocks of riding. This "drying" process helped to provide a reliable and rich source of protein that would keep for months. This is unlikely, however, as the use of horses did not begin until the systematized colonization of South Africa. Others speculate that the early Afrikaner settlers simply adopted a local indigenous custom of preserving meat.

In the Second Boer War commandos relied on making biltong to sustain them on the open veld. In the First World War, some South African soldiers on the Western Front had biltong specially shipped to them from home.

In January 2017, a research group at the University of Beira Interior in Portugal published a study about the antimicrobial properties of coriander oil (coriander being one of the main spices in the most basic of biltong recipes) against 12 bacterial strains, and found that 10 of the 12 strains of bacteria were killed with a relatively mild concentration of coriander oil (1.6%). In the two strains which were not effectively killed, Bacillus cereus and Enterococcus faecalis, the coriander oil reduced their growth significantly.

The need for food preservation in Southern Africa was pressing. Iceboxes and refrigerators had not been invented yet, and building up herds of livestock took a long time. With game in abundance in Southern Africa, however, traditional methods were called upon to preserve the meat of large African animals including the eland.

The meat was prepared with vinegar and spices then hung to be air dried for a fortnight during the winter, when the colder temperatures further inhibited bacterial and fungal growth. Once suitably dried, the biltong was ready for packing in cloth bags which allowed air circulation to help prevent mold.

== Ingredients ==
The most common ingredients of biltong are:

- Meat
- Black pepper
- Coriander
- Salt
- Vinegar

Modern-day ingredients sometimes include balsamic vinegar or malt vinegar, sugar, dry ground chilli peppers, nutmeg, paprika, lemon juice, garlic, bicarb soda, Worcestershire sauce, onion powder, and saltpetre.

== Meat ==
Prior to the introduction of refrigeration, the curing process was used to preserve all kinds of meat in Southern Africa, but biltong is most commonly made today from beef, primarily because of its widespread availability and lower cost relative to game. For the finest cuts, fillet, sirloin, or steaks cut from the hip, such as topside or silverside, are used. Other cuts can be used, but are not as high in quality.

Biltong can also be made from:

- Chicken, simply referred to as chicken biltong
- Fish in this case, known as bokkoms (shark biltong can also be found in South Africa). Bokkoms should not be confused with other cured fish such as dried angelfish, dried snoek and tuna.
- Game such as kudu, springbok, and wildebeest
- Ostrich meat (bright red, often resembling game)
- Venison meat (used in Europe resembling game)

== Preparation ==
Traditionally, biltong was only made during the cold of winter when the risk of bacterial growth and mould would be at a minimum. Some recipes require the meat to be marinated in a vinegar solution (grape vinegar is traditional but balsamic and cider also work very well) for a few hours, then the vinegar is poured off before the meat is flavoured with salt and spices. The spice mix is sprinkled liberally over the meat and rubbed in. Saltpetre is optional and can be added as an extra preservative (necessary only for wet biltong that is not going to be frozen). The meat should then be left for a further few hours (or refrigerated overnight) and any excess liquid poured off before the meat is hung in the dryer.

Other recipes, which were handed down from generation to generation, require the biltong to be left overnight in the vinegar, salt, and spice solution (between 12 and 24 hours). The spice mix traditionally consists of equal amounts of rock salt, whole coriander (slightly roasted), roughly ground black pepper, and brown sugar. The vinegar serves as a primary inhibitor of Clostridium botulinum bacteria, according to the World Health Organization, while the salt, coriander, pepper, and cloves all have antimicrobial properties.

== Drying ==
Biltong is always an air-dried meat. When heat is added, it is called 'jerky.'

Traditionally, biltong was made during the cold winters of the South African highveld for best results. The cold, dry air typically dried out the biltong much more effectively, and in the best possible food safety environment. Mold and bacterial risk are at a natural minimum, and thicker biltong cuts can be hung to dry slowly for a richer texture, fuller flavour, and darker colour.

Heat has only been introduced into the process in recent years by sellers who erroneously still call it 'biltong', however, it is not authentic biltong and traditional biltong makers maintain that heat makes for an inferior end result.

== Comparison with jerky ==
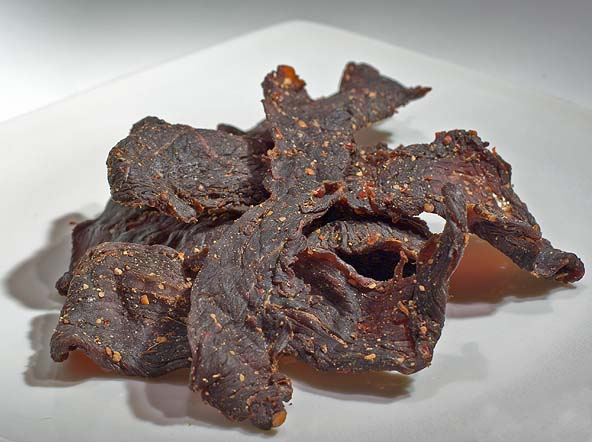
Beef jerky

Biltong differs from jerky in several distinct ways:

- Biltong is air-dried over days, whereas jerky is heated to at least 71 °C (160 °F).
- Since jerky is heat-dried, the process is much faster than for making biltong.
- The meat used in biltong is often much thicker due to the faster drying time in dry air conditions; typically, biltong meat is cut in strips around 25 millimetres (0.98 in) wide, but can be thicker. Jerky is normally very thin meat.
- The vinegar, salt, and spices in biltong, together with the drying process, cure the meat as well as adding texture and flavour. Jerky is traditionally dried with salt, but without vinegar.
- Jerky is often smoked; biltong is rarely smoked.
- Biltong normally does not contain any sugar, nitrates, or other additives, while jerky usually does.

== Retail ==
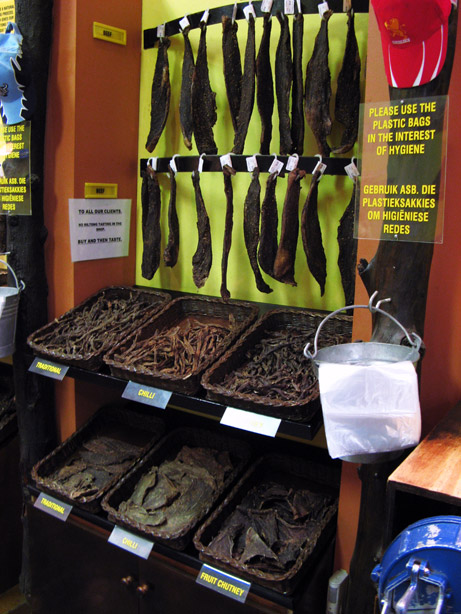
A display in a shop that sells biltong, Johannesburg

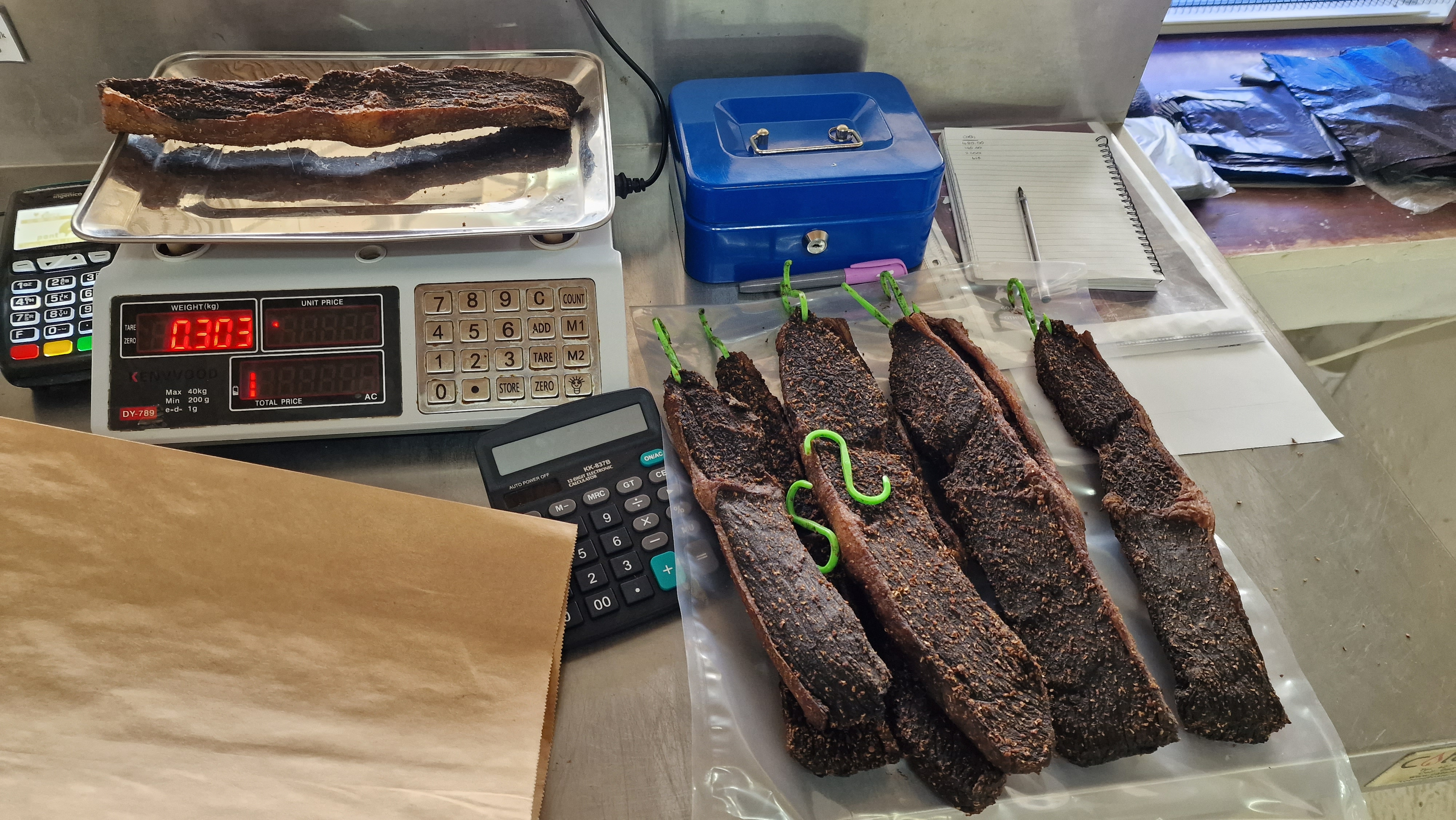
Biltong being weighed and prepared for retail sale

Biltong is a common product in Southern African butcheries and grocery stores, and can be bought in the form of wide strips or much thinner strips (known as stokkies, meaning "little sticks"). It is also sold in plastic bags, sometimes shrink-wrapped, and may be either finely shredded or sliced as biltong chips.

Also, some specialised retailers sell biltong. These shops may sell biltong as "wet" (moist), "medium", or "dry". Additionally, some customers prefer it with a lot of fat, while others prefer it as lean as possible.

== Eating ==
While biltong is usually eaten as a snack, it can also be diced up into stews, or added to muffins or pot bread. Biltong-flavoured potato crisps have also been produced, and some cheese spreads have biltong flavour. Finely shredded biltong is eaten on slices of bread and in sandwiches.

Biltong can be used as a teething aid for babies.

Biltong is a high-protein food. Often, 200 g of beef is required to make 100 g of biltong, and the process of making biltong preserves most of the protein content. Some biltong can have up to 67% protein content.

== Worldwide ==
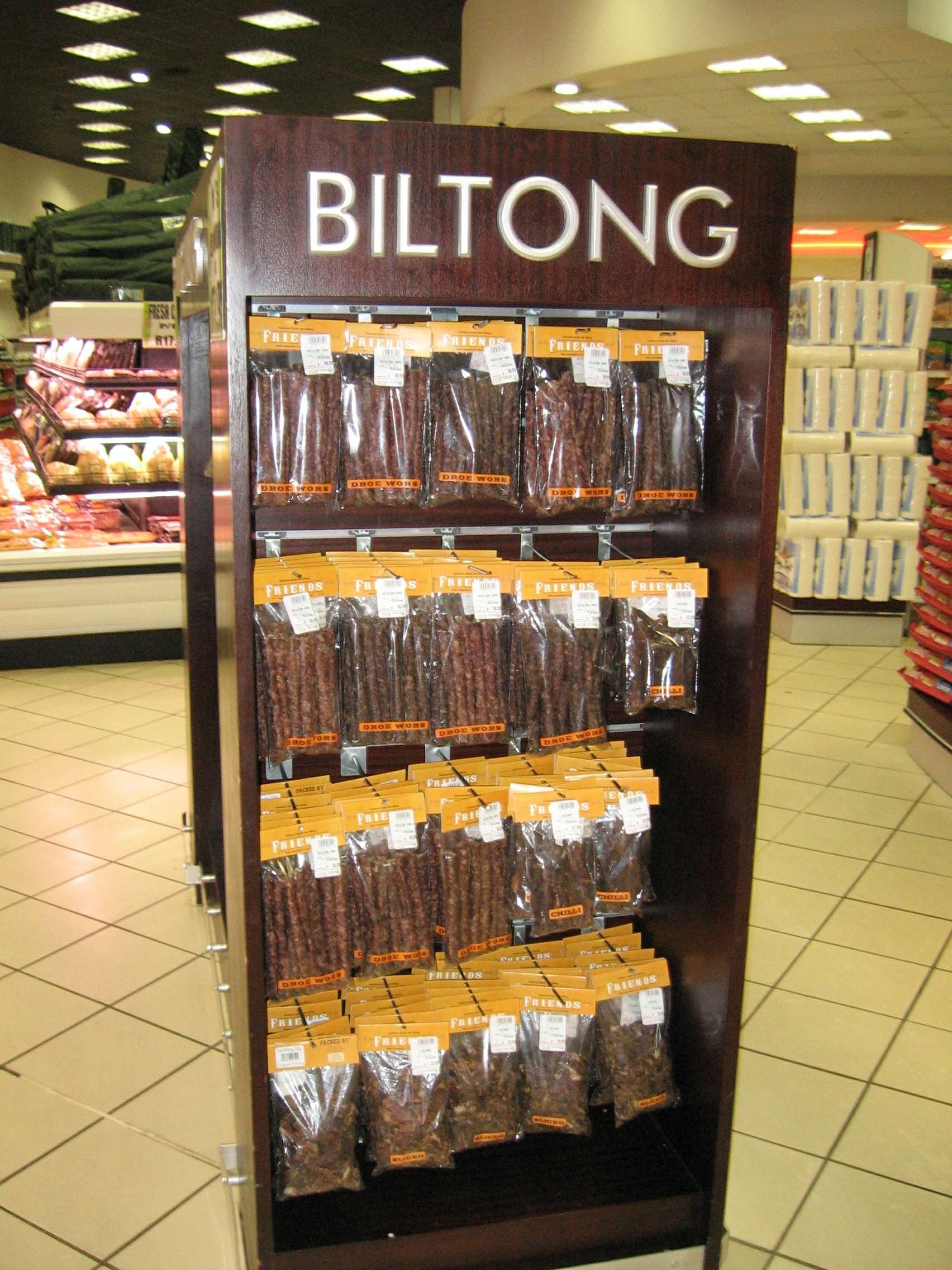
Point of sale display, Spar supermarket in Johannesburg

Biltong's popularity has spread to many other countries with large South African populations, who often regard it with pride as a defining national food - Canada, the United Kingdom, Australia, New Zealand, Ireland, the United States, and India. Biltong is also produced within South African expatriate communities across the globe, for example in Germany, Ireland, and even South Korea.

In the United States, biltong is relatively rare, as beef jerky has been traditionally the more popular dried meat snack. Within the last few years, biltong has begun a small emergence within the United States, particularly from South African immigrants who have brought their local culture and foods with them. Due to concerns related to the presence of foot-and-mouth disease in South Africa, the United States Department of Agriculture requires a meat inspection certificate issued by a South African government authority to accompany imports of biltong.

== See also ==
- List of African dishes – Common culinary dishes found in Africa
- List of dried foods

Media related to Biltong at Wikimedia Commons The dictionary definition of biltong at Wiktionary

=== Similar foods ===
Foods similar to biltong include:

- Bresaola – Air-dried and salted beef
- Carne seca – Mexican dried beef
- Cecina – Salted and dried or cured meat
- Charqui – Dried lean meat strips
- Droëwors – South African snack food
- Jerky – Dried lean meat strips
- Kilishi – Hausa dish of spiced dried beef, sheep, cow, chicken, mutton or goat meat
- Metworst – Type of traditional Dutch sausage
- Mojama – Andalusian cured tuna delicacy
- Pastırma – Spiced dried beef
- Pemmican – Food mix with long shelf life, sometimes used as survival food
- Slinzega – Air-dried meat product from the Italian Alps
