= Suho meso =

Traditional South Slavic smoked beef

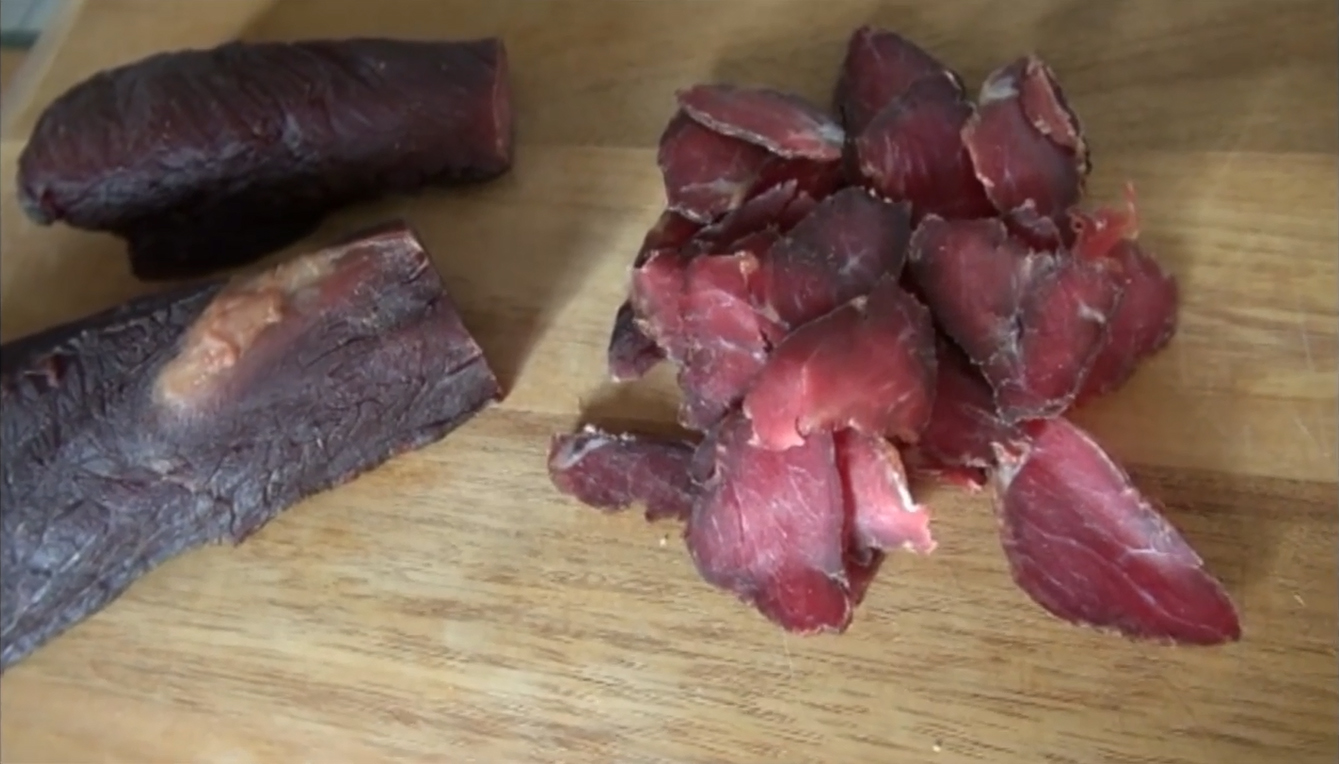
Suho meso

Suho meso (literally: "dry meat") is a smoked beef preparation eaten in Bosnian, Serbian, Croatian and Montenegrin cuisine. The meat is cured in a coarse salt for multiple days before being hung to dry over a fire for multiple days or weeks, depending on the size of meat. This process is traditionally done in the winter to prevent the meat from spoiling. It is similar to pastirma (Albanian: pastërma; Macedonian: пастрма; Bulgarian: пастърма; Hungarian: basturma/pásztirma), except there is no specific chemen spread around the meat.

== See also ==
- Beef jerky
- Bresaola
- Visočka pečenica
- List of dried foods
- List of smoked foods
