= Pastirma =

Spiced dried beef

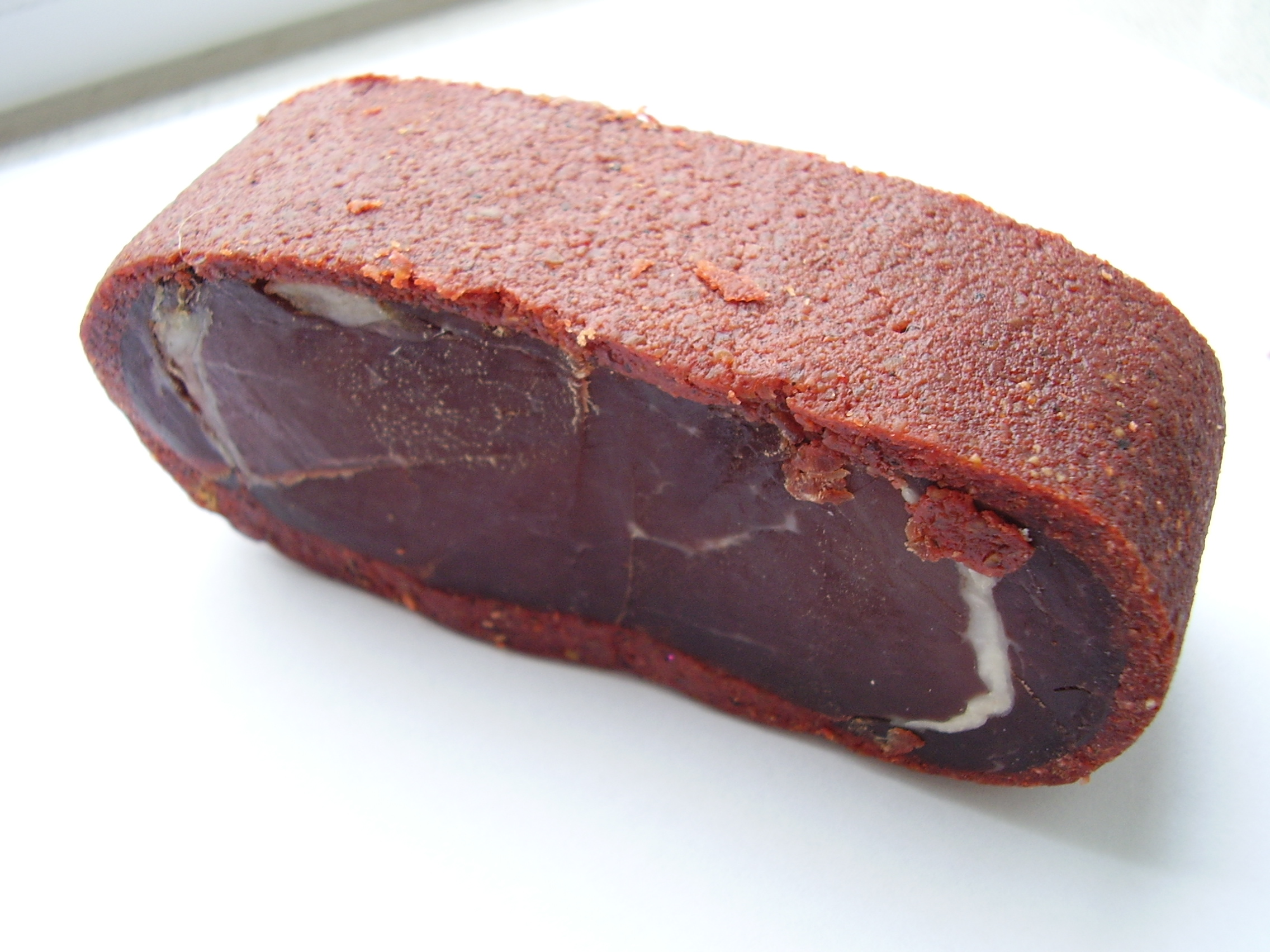
Pastirma

Pastirma is a heavily seasoned, air-dried cured meat, typically water buffalo or beef, that is found in multiple Balkan and Mediterranean cuisines under a variety of names.

== Etymology and history ==
The dish has multiple names in a variety of cuisines. It is known as or pasterma, pastarma, pastırma, pastrma, pastourma, basdirma, basterma, basturma, or aboukh.

Basturma existed in ancient Armenian cuisine, where it was known as aboukh (Armenian: աբուխ). The word abookhd (Classical Armenian: ապուխտ, romanized: apukht) was already used in the Armenian translation of the Bible, in the fifth century AD, meaning “salted and dried meat”. According to T. Durham, basturma is of Armenian origin and was later exported to the Middle East, where it is still prepared according to old family recipes.

Pastırma is mentioned in Mahmud of Kashgar's Diwan Lughat al-Turk and Evliya Çelebi's Seyahatname. According to Turkish scholar Biron Kiliç, the term is derived from the Turkic noun bastırma, which means "pressing". The Oxford Encyclopedia of Food and Drink writes that pastırma is the word the Ottomans used for a type of Byzantine cured beef that was called paston (παστόν). According to Johannes Koder, an expert in Byzantine studies, paston could mean either salted meat or salted fish, while akropaston (ἀκρόπαστον) means salted meat. Andrew Dalby gives the definition of paston as "salted fish" and akropaston apakin as "well-salted fillet steak". Gregory Nagy gives the definition of akropaston as "smoked", describing apakin as "a kind of salami sausage, probably similar to pastourma". The Oxford Companion for Food says that a Byzantine dried meat delicacy was "a forerunner of the pastirma of modern Turkey".

The English word pastrami came by way of Yiddish and perhaps combined with the word salami.

== Preparation and usage ==
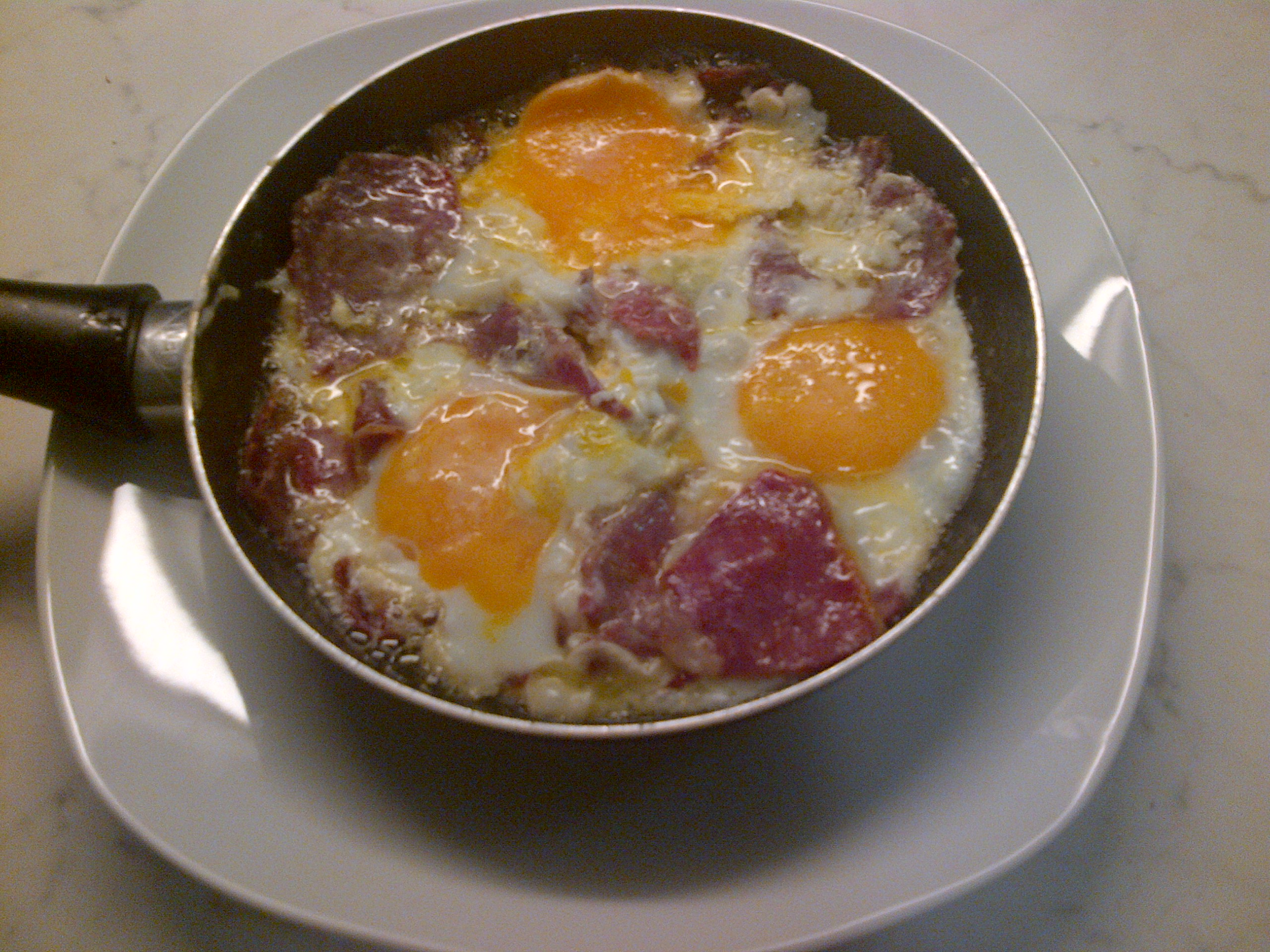
Pastirma with three eggs, a common breakfast dish

Pastirma is prepared by salting the meat, then washing it with water and letting it dry for ten to 15 days. After that the blood and salt is squeezed out of the meat which is then covered with a cumin paste called çemen (lit. "fenugreek") prepared with crushed cumin, fenugreek, garlic, and hot paprika, followed by thorough air-drying. Even though beef is the most common meat today, various meats are also used depending on locality, including camel, lamb, goat, and water buffalo.

== Cuisines ==
Pastirma, or a variation of it is present in the cuisines of Armenia, Turkey, Greece, Cyprus, Bulgaria, Azerbaijan, Egypt, Levant, the Kurds, and the Arabs. A similar cured beef product that doesnt use chemen, called Suho Meso, is popular in Serbia, Montenegro, Bosnia, and Croatia, while pastrama/pastrami is popular in Romania, Israel and amongst Jews in general.

=== Armenia ===
The cured meat, which resembles Italian bresaola, is called basturma (բաստուրմա) or aboukht (ապուխտ) by Armenians. Some Armenian pizzerias in cities like Yerevan, Boston and Los Angeles serve basturma topped pizza. Armenian restaurants also serve basturma topped burgers, basturma can be added to salads, and basturma with omelette is also a common breakfast item in Armenia. Basturma, or a basturma omelette can also be wrapped inside a lavash, alongside other ingredients like coriander, chechil cheese, and garlic matzoon.

According to Nigol Bezjian, Armenians who survived the 1915 genocide brought basturma with them to the Middle East. Bezjian recalls that his grandmother used to prepare "basturma omelets fried in olive oil with pieces of lavash bread". He notes that Armenians from Kayseri were particularly renowned basturma producers.

Arabs mocked Armenians with phrases like "It smells like there is basturma here", referring to the strong smell of basturma that is produced by the garlic and fenugreek mixture that the meat is coated in during preservation. Shoushou, a well-known Lebanese comedian of the 1960s–1970s, portrayed a caricature of an Armenian basturma seller; he retired the character after local Lebanese Armenians complained.

In Palestine, Armenian families gather on New Year's Eve and eat traditional foods including basturma, chi kofta and a traditional Armenian confection called kaghtsr sujukh (քաղցր սուջուխ).

In 2025, Armenia applied for geographical indication (GI) registration for Armenian basturma.

=== Bulgaria ===
Pastarma (as it is called in Bulgaria) arrived in Bulgaria in the 7th century. Specific products include Пастърма говежда / Pastarma Govezhda, which was registered as a Traditional Speciality Guaranteed in the EU in 2017.

=== Egypt ===
In Egypt bastirma (بسطرمة) is customarily made from lean cuts of beef or water buffalo, such as the eye of round or tenderloin. These cuts are first cured with salt to extract excess moisture. Following the curing process, the meat is enveloped in a wet paste made with a blend of spices, including fenugreek, paprika, cumin, black pepper, and garlic, which creates a flavorful crust. The meat is then left to air-dry until it reaches a firm texture, a duration that varies with its size, and is ultimately served in thin slices. It is often eaten with eggs for breakfast or as a topping in other dishes, like savory versions of feteer.

=== Turkey ===
In Turkish cuisine pastırma can be eaten as a breakfast dish, and it is a common ingredient in omelettes, menemen (Turkish-style shakshouka) or a variation of eggs benedict.

Pastırma can be used as a topping for hummus, pide bread, hamburgers, and toasted sandwiches with either cheddar cheese or kasar cheese. It can be as a filling for a börek that is made with kadayıf instead of the traditional filo dough. It may be combined with potato to make a filling for traditional böreks as well.

It is also a common addition to many of the traditional vegetable dishes, especially the tomato and white bean stew called kuru fasulye, but also cabbage (pastırmalı lahana), chickpeas (pastırmalı nohut), asparagus (pastırmalı kuşkonmaz) and spinach (pastırmalı ıspanak). It can also be used to make cheesy pull-apart bread.

=== The Levant ===
Pastirma is a common dish found in convenience stores in Syria and Lebanon, its especially common among Armenians in Lebanon and Syria.

== Production ==
Turkey produces around 2041 tons of pastirma each year. The pastirma from Kayseri is particularly well known. In their 1893 report the British Foreign Office note that Kayseri, which they call Cesarea, "is specially renowned for the preparation of basturma".

== See also ==
- Biltong – Southern African air-dried cured meat
- Cecina – Salted and dried or cured meat
- Jerky – Lean meat dried to prevent spoilage
- Montreal-style smoked meat – Smoked style of corned beef created by Jewish immigrants in Montreal, Quebec
- List of dried foods
- Pastrami – Meat preserved by partial drying, seasoning, smoking, and steaming

== Bibliography ==
- Alan Davidson, The Oxford Companion to Food. Oxford University Press, Oxford 1999. ISBN 0-19-211579-0.
- Maria Kaneva-Johnson, The Melting Pot. Balkan Food and Cookery, Prospect Books, 1995. ISBN 0-907325-57-2.
