= Maui Nui Venison =

Venison producer in Maui, Hawaii

Maui Nui Venison is a venison producer on the island of Maui, Hawaii. The company harvests axis deer, an invasive species in Hawaii, in order to balance the population, and sells the resulting meat. Its night harvesting and field processing system is unique in the world.

== History ==
Maui Nui Venison was founded in 2015 by Jake and Ku‘ulani Muise to address the invasive axis deer problem on Maui by culling them and selling the meat to the public. Axis deer are native to the Indian subcontinent, and were brought to Hawaii in the 1860s, as a gift to the Hawaiian king. The deer are prolific breeders, one of the few deer species able to breed year-round, and have no predators on the island. In large numbers, they cause severe damage to the island's ecosystem. As of 2023, the axis deer population on Maui numbers 50,000 to 60,000, growing at about 30% annually.

Jake Muise was formerly axis deer coordinator for the Big Island Invasive Species Committee. The organization led eradication efforts on Hawaii Island, after the deer, populous on the islands of Molokai, Lānai and Maui, were illegally introduced to the main island in 2009. High tech tracking methods involving camera traps, forward-looking infrared (FLIR), and radio telemetry were used to aid in locating the animals.

In order to commercially hunt wild deer, Maui Nui Venison had to comply with US Department of Agriculture (USDA) regulations for hunting and processing, and animal and meat inspection. A hunting operation on Molokai, Molokai Wildlife Management, in 2007 became the first in Hawaii to obtain a USDA permit to cull axis deer and sell the USDA-certified meat.

== Operations ==
The company uses FLIR equipment to track the deer at night, and kills, processes and stores the venison in a mobile facility. The intention is to allow the animals to roam wild and unstressed by the hunt, until the moment of death. Following USDA requirements, only headshots are permitted. The hunters carry the carcasses on their backs to the processing facility to avoid ground contamination. Hunting is conducted on privately owned ranches, where the majority of the deer live. To meet U.S. certification requirements, the harvest team is accompanied by a USDA inspector, and each carcass is inspected by a USDA veterinarian. The overall system makes it the only such field operation in the world.

== Products ==
Maui Nui sells the entire animal online, as cuts of meat, bone broth, individual organs, ground meat, jerky, and pet treats. Products are shipped frozen, available within the United States.
