= Slinzega =

Air-dried meat product from the Italian Alps

Slinzega is a type of air-dried meat produced in the Valtellina and Valchiavenna valleys, in the Italian Alps. It is made in a similar manner to bresaola, with smaller pieces of meat, which therefore bear a stronger taste. According to some sources, it originally used horse meat rather than beef. Nevertheless, today virtually any type of meat is suitable for its production, the most common being beef, deer and pork.

== Characteristics ==
Aesthetically it looks quite similar to bresaola, but it is produced in much smaller sizes (300–800 g) and has a much stronger flavor due to the aromatization with salt, cinnamon, cloves, garlic, bay leaf, and pepper.

The charcuterie lasts about a month.

== See also ==
- List of dried foods
