= Jerky gun =

Small handheld kitchen appliance

A jerky gun is a small handheld kitchen appliance that is used to form raw ground meat into thin strips or round sticks. These thin raw meat strips and sticks are then typically dehydrated into jerky via a food dehydrator or home oven.

A jerky gun is similar to a caulking gun in appearance, size, equipment parts and manner of use. A jerky gun basically consists of four major parts:

- A tube or barrel that raw ground meat is loaded into;
- A press or stomper that is used to push the raw ground meat towards the extrusion end of tube thereby eliminating air pockets within the tube;
- A trigger or handle that is depressed to create force and propel the raw meat through the end of the tube; and
- Nozzles that attach on the end of the tube and form thin strips or round stick shapes as the raw meat is expelled.
