= Droëwors =

South African snack food

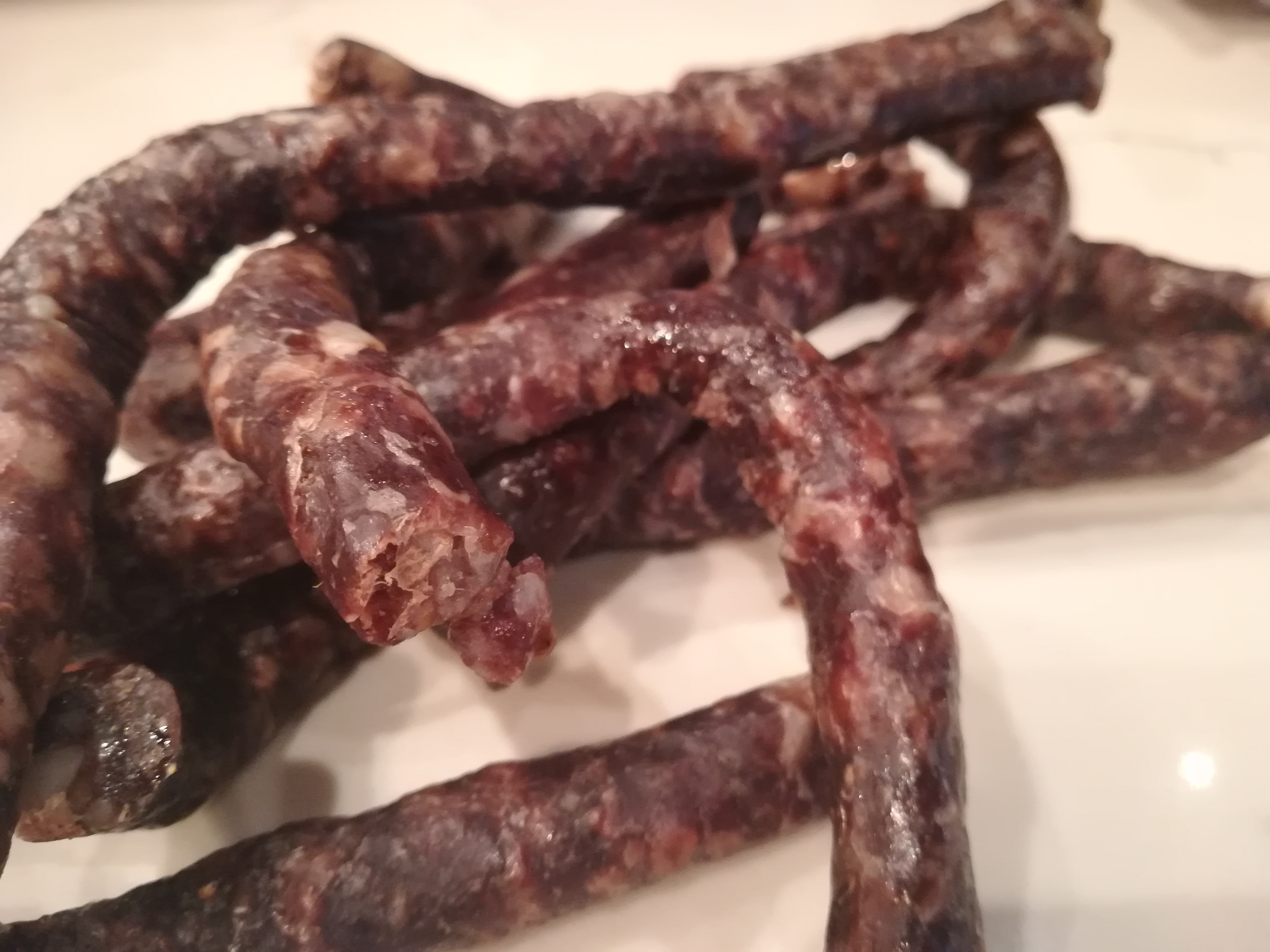
- A piece of droëwors
- Course: Sausage
- Place of origin: Namibia, South Africa
- Main ingredients: Beef and mutton

Droëwors (/ˈdruːəvɔːrs/; Afrikaans for "dry sausage", from Dutch: droge worst) is a Southern African snack food, based on the traditional, coriander-seed spiced boerewors sausage. It is usually made as a dunwors (Afrikaans for "thin sausage") rather than dikwors ("thick sausage"), as the thinner sausage dries more quickly and is thus less likely to spoil before it can be preserved. If dikwors is to be used, it is usually flattened to provide a larger surface area for drying.

The recipe used for these dried sausages is similar to that for boerewors, although pork and veal are usually replaced by beef, as the former can go rancid when dried, and mutton fat replaces the pork fat used in boerewors. Drying makes the sausage suitable for unrefrigerated storage.

Droëwors is unusual among dried meats in being dried quickly in warm, dry conditions, unlike traditional droge worst and Italian cured salumi, which are dried slowly in relatively cold and humid conditions. In addition, droëwors does not contain a curing agent as found in cured sausage. Thus droëwors kept in moist conditions can become moldy, unlike cured sausage.

The product is related both in name and in nature to the Dutch droge worst, also known as metworst.

== See also ==
- Biltong
- List of dried foods
- South African cuisine
