= Cecina (meat) =

Salted and dried or cured meat

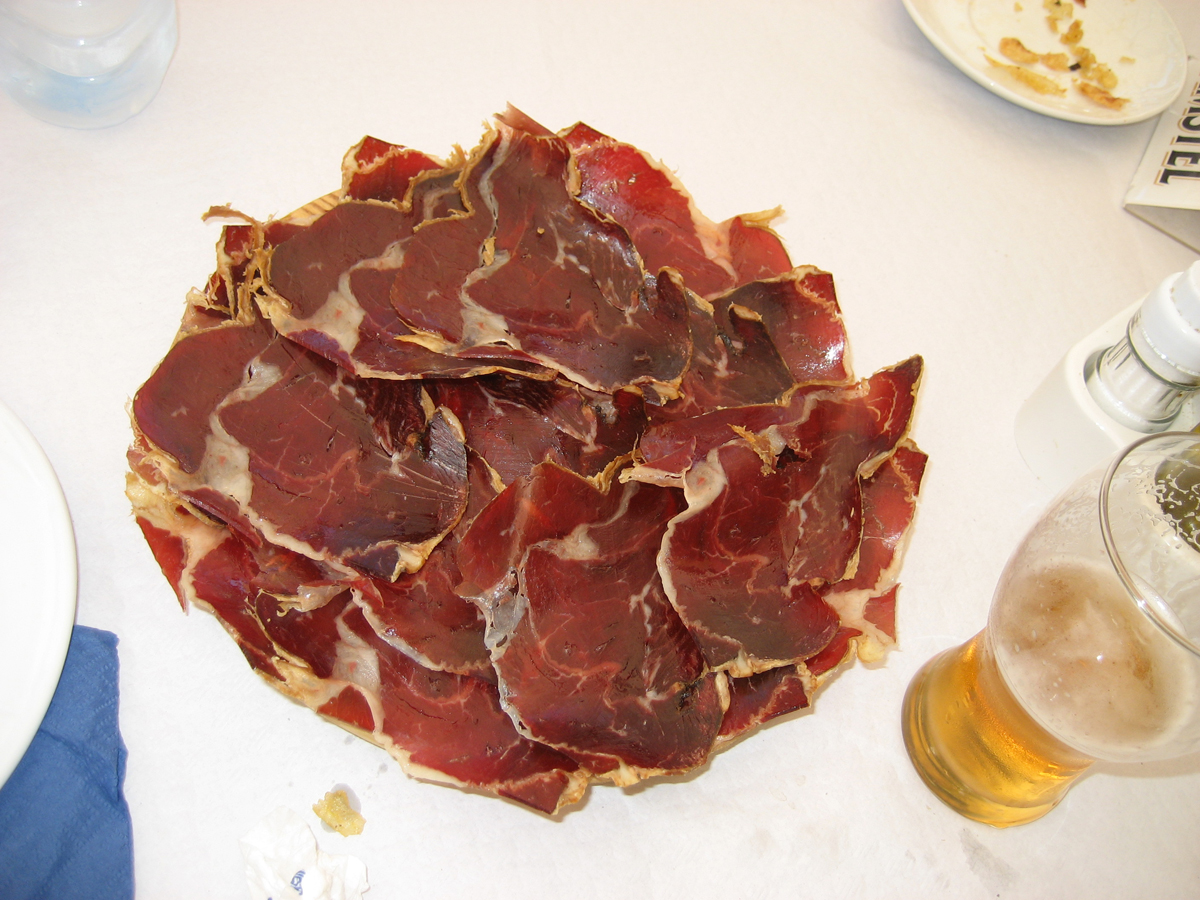
- Cecina
- Course: Appetiser
- Place of origin: Spain
- Region or state: León
- Serving temperature: Room temperature (approximately 15–20 °C or 60–70 °F)
- Main ingredients: Cow
- Variations: Jamón

In Spanish, cecina [θeˈθina] is meat that has been salted and dried by means of air, sun or smoke. The word comes from the Latin siccus (dry), via Vulgar Latin (caro) *siccīna, "dry (meat)".

== Spain ==
Cecina is similar to ham and is made by curing cow, horse or rabbit meat. The best known cecina is Cecina de León, which is made of the hind legs of a cow, salted, smoked and air-dried in the provinces of León and Palencia in northwestern Spain, and has PGI status.

== Latin America ==
The word cecina is also used to name other kinds of dried or cured meat in Latin America.

=== Mexico ===
In Mexico, most cecina is of two kinds: sheets of marinated beef, and a pork cut that is sliced or butterflied thin and coated with chili pepper (this type is called cecina enchilada or carne enchilada). The beef version is salted and marinated and laid to dry somewhat in the sun. The marinated beef version can be consumed uncooked, similar to prosciutto. The pork "cecina enchilada" must be cooked before consumption. The town of Yecapixtla is well known for its version of the dish, which varies from region to region.

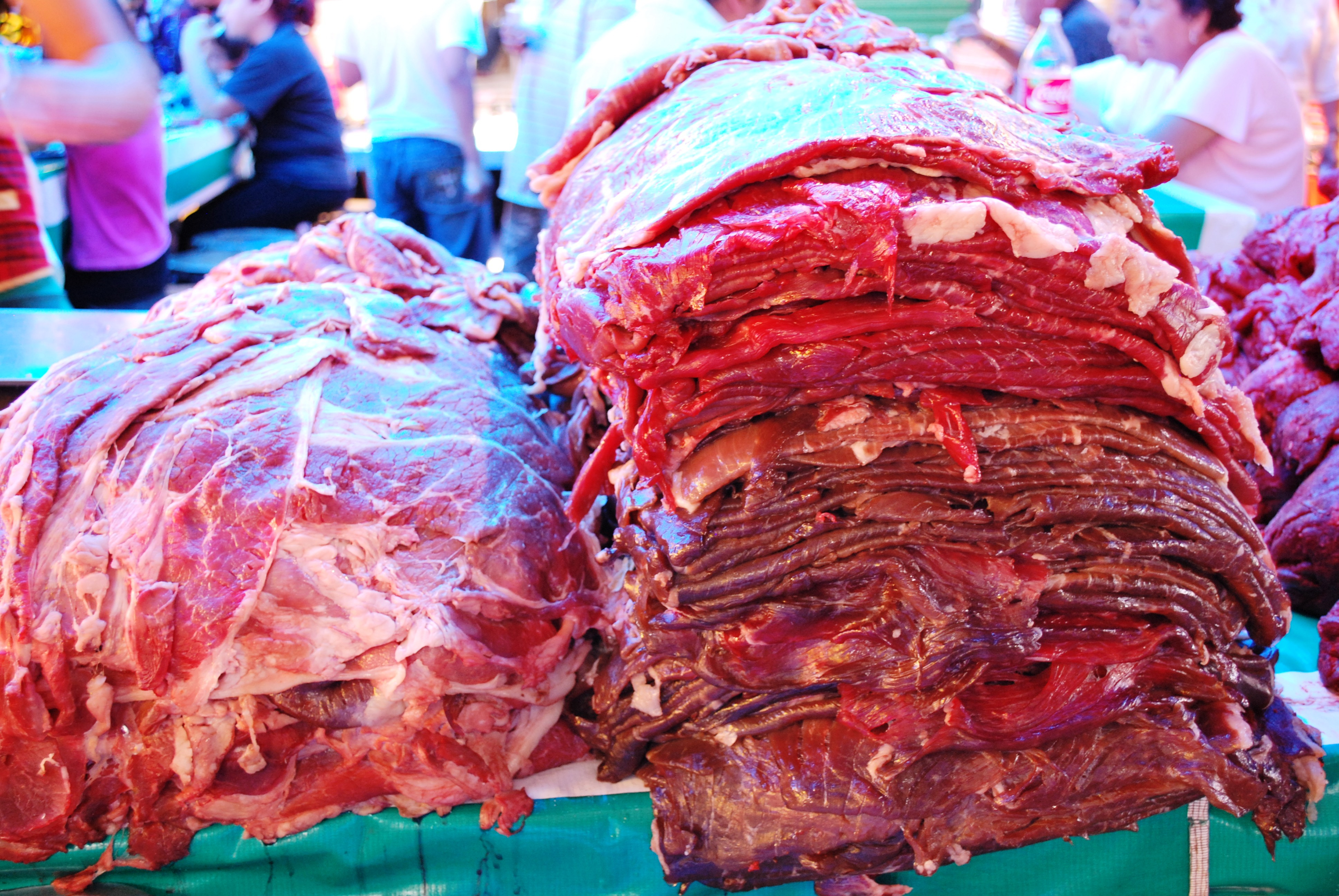
Cecina in Mexico

== See also ==
- Bresaola
- Pastırma
- Biltong
- Leonese cuisine
- List of dried foods
- List of smoked foods
- List of Mexican dishes
- List of Spanish dishes
