= Jerky =

Dried lean meat strips

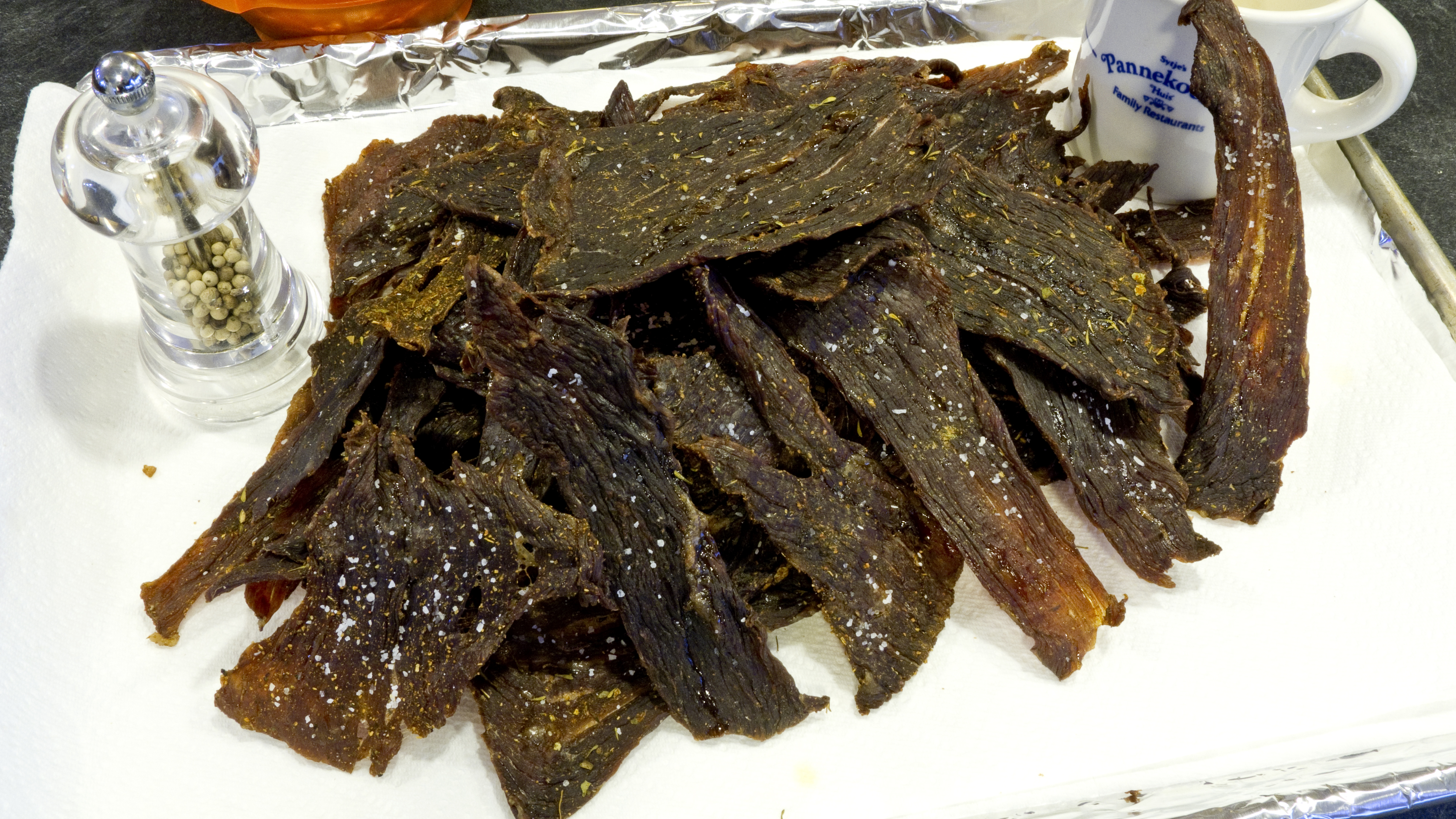
Jerky

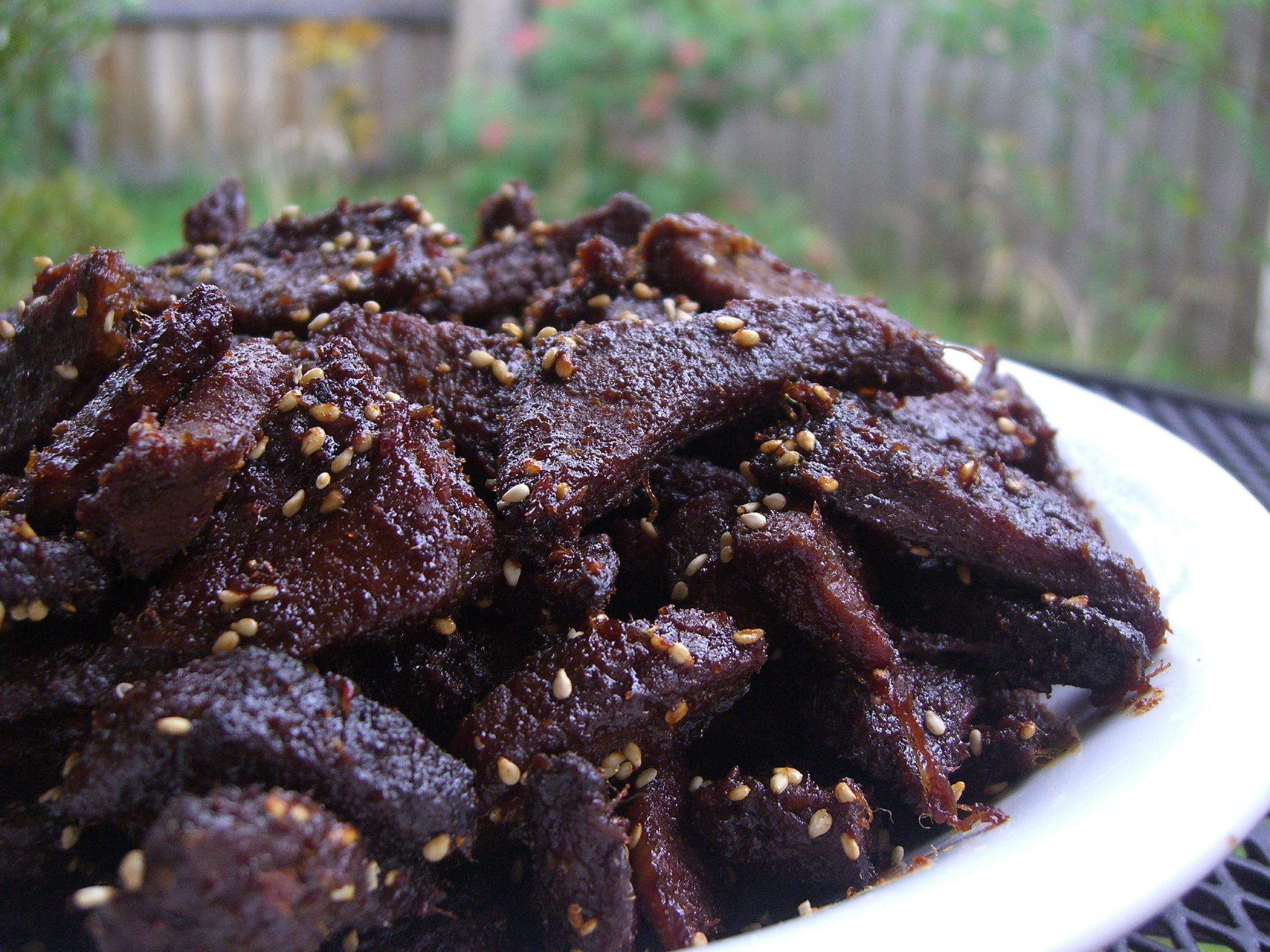
Orange-marinated beef jerky

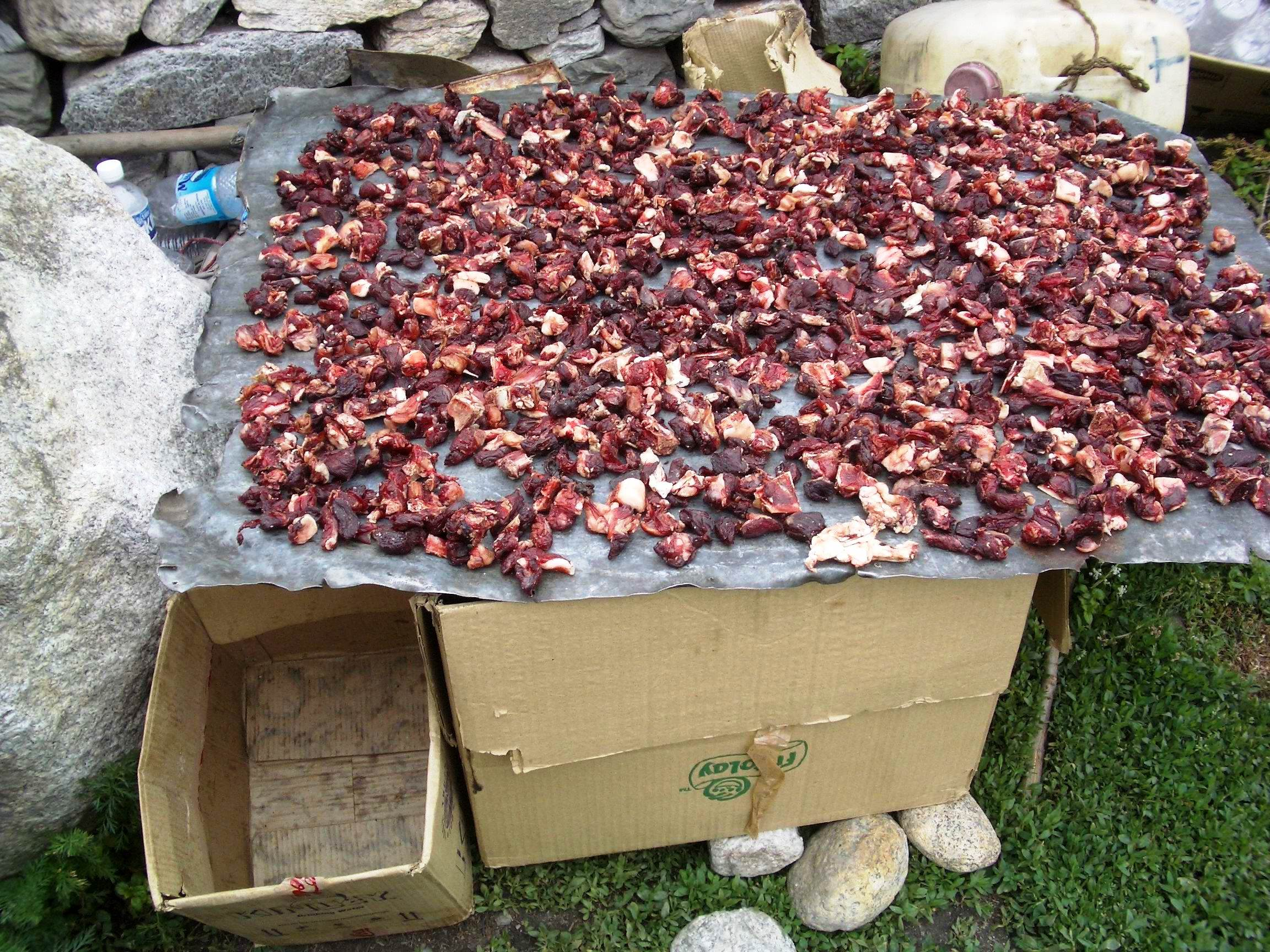
Meat drying to make jerky. Gandhola Monastery, Lahaul, India

Jerky is lean trimmed meat strips which are dehydrated to prevent spoilage and seasoned to varying degrees. Normally, this drying includes the addition of salt to prevent microbial growth through osmosis. The word "jerky" derives from the Quechua word ch'arki which means "dried, salted meat".

Modern manufactured jerky is often marinated, prepared with a seasoned spice rub or liquid, or smoked with low heat (usually under 70 °C or 160 °F). Store-bought jerky commonly includes sweeteners such as brown sugar.

Jerky is ready to eat, needs no additional preparation, and can be stored for months without refrigeration. A proper protein-to-moisture content is required in the final cured product to ensure maximum shelf-life.

Many products that are sold as jerky consist of highly processed, chopped, and formed meat rather than traditional sliced whole-muscle meat. These products may contain more fat, but moisture content, as in the whole-muscle product, must meet a 0.75 to 1 moisture-to-protein ratio in the US.

Jerky-like products can be found around the world, such as biltong in South Africa, pastirma in Turkey, kilishi in Nigeria and Cameroon, ch'arki (Quechua for dried, salted meat whose hispanicized spellings include charque, charqui or charquí) in South America, Carne seca in Latin America, and cecina in Spain. The main processing districts of beef jerky in China are Inner Mongolia, Xinjiang and Yunnan. Beef jerky from Inner Mongolia is the most popular jerky product in all of China and is classified into traditional and modern beef jerky by air drying outdoors (hand-made) or thermal drying (large-scale industrial production), respectively.

== Preparation ==
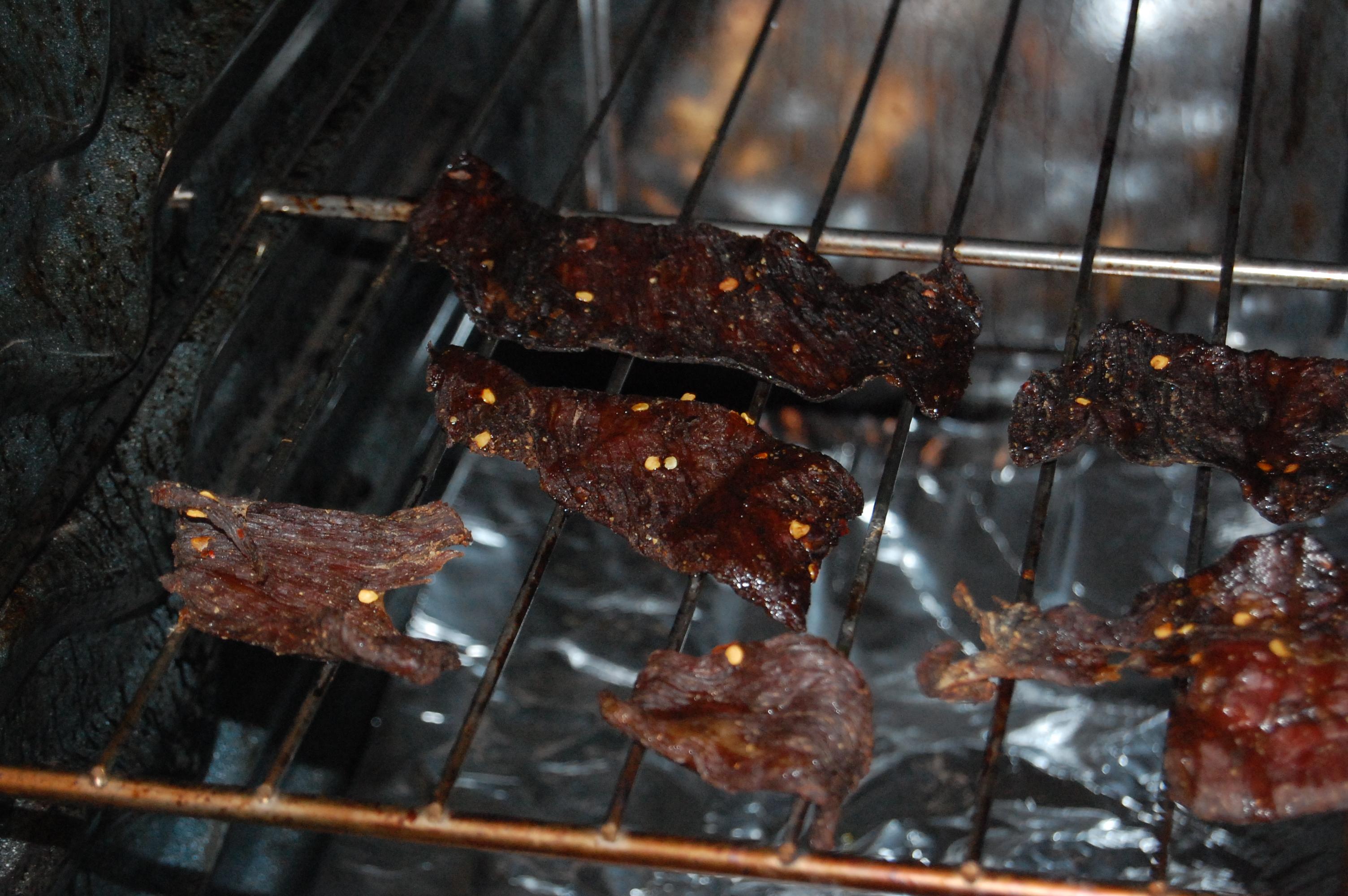
Beef jerky being dried

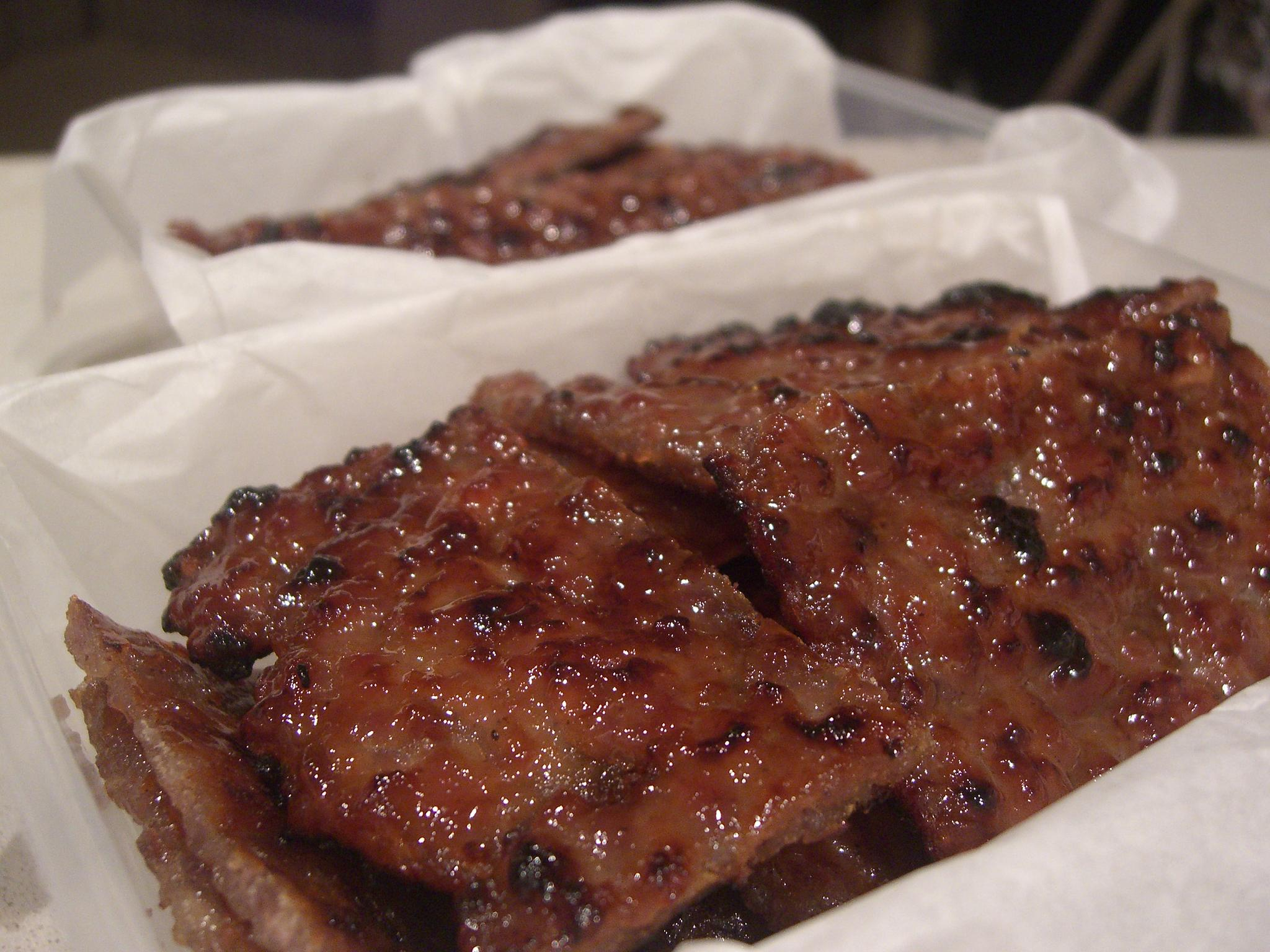
Chinese bakkwa jerky

Jerky is made from domesticated animals as well as game animals. Jerky from domesticated animals includes llama, beef, pork, goat and mutton or lamb and game animals such as guanaco, deer, kudu, springbok, kangaroo, and bison are also used. Other animals such as turkey, ostrich, squid, salmon, chicken, duck, goose, shrimp, ox, octopus, alligator, pigeon, crocodile, tuna, emu, horse, camel, lion, bear, rabbit, shark, snake and earthworm have entered the global, national, regional or local market with varying degrees of success.

Most fat must be trimmed from the meat prior to drying, as fat increases the chances of spoilage (modern vacuum packing and chemical preservatives have served to help prevent these risks). The meat must be dried quickly to limit bacterial growth during the critical period when the meat is not yet dry. To dry quickly without high temperature, which would cook the meat, the meat must be sliced or pressed thin.

Salt is the most commonly added ingredient and is used to improve flavor, enhance the storage life and remove moisture from the product. Spices such as black pepper or garlic are other common ingredients. Ingredients such as soy sauce, Worcestershire sauce, sugar, teriyaki or barbecue spice can be added to change the flavor and are usually employed in homemade beef jerky recipes.

In industrial settings, large low-temperature drying ovens with many heater elements and fans use exhaust ports to remove moisture-laden air. The combination of fast-moving air and low heat dries the meat to the desired moisture content within a few hours. The raw, marinated jerky strips are placed on racks of nylon-coated metal screens sprayed with light vegetable oil to allow the meat to be removed easily. The screen trays are placed closely in layers on rolling carts and then put in the drying oven.

A plethora of suitable dehydrators for use at home with the aim of producing homemade jerky are widely available. These dehydrators work by passing heated air over the meat to remove moisture in order to dry it. The air evaporates moisture in the meat drying it out.

Chemical preservatives, such as sodium nitrite, are often used to prepare jerky with the historical salted drying procedure. Smoking is the most traditional method, as it preserves, flavors, and dries the meat simultaneously. Salting is the most common method used today, as it provides seasoning to improve the flavor as well as preserve the meat. While some methods involve applying the seasonings with a marinade, adding moisture to the meat can increase the drying time.

== Packaging ==
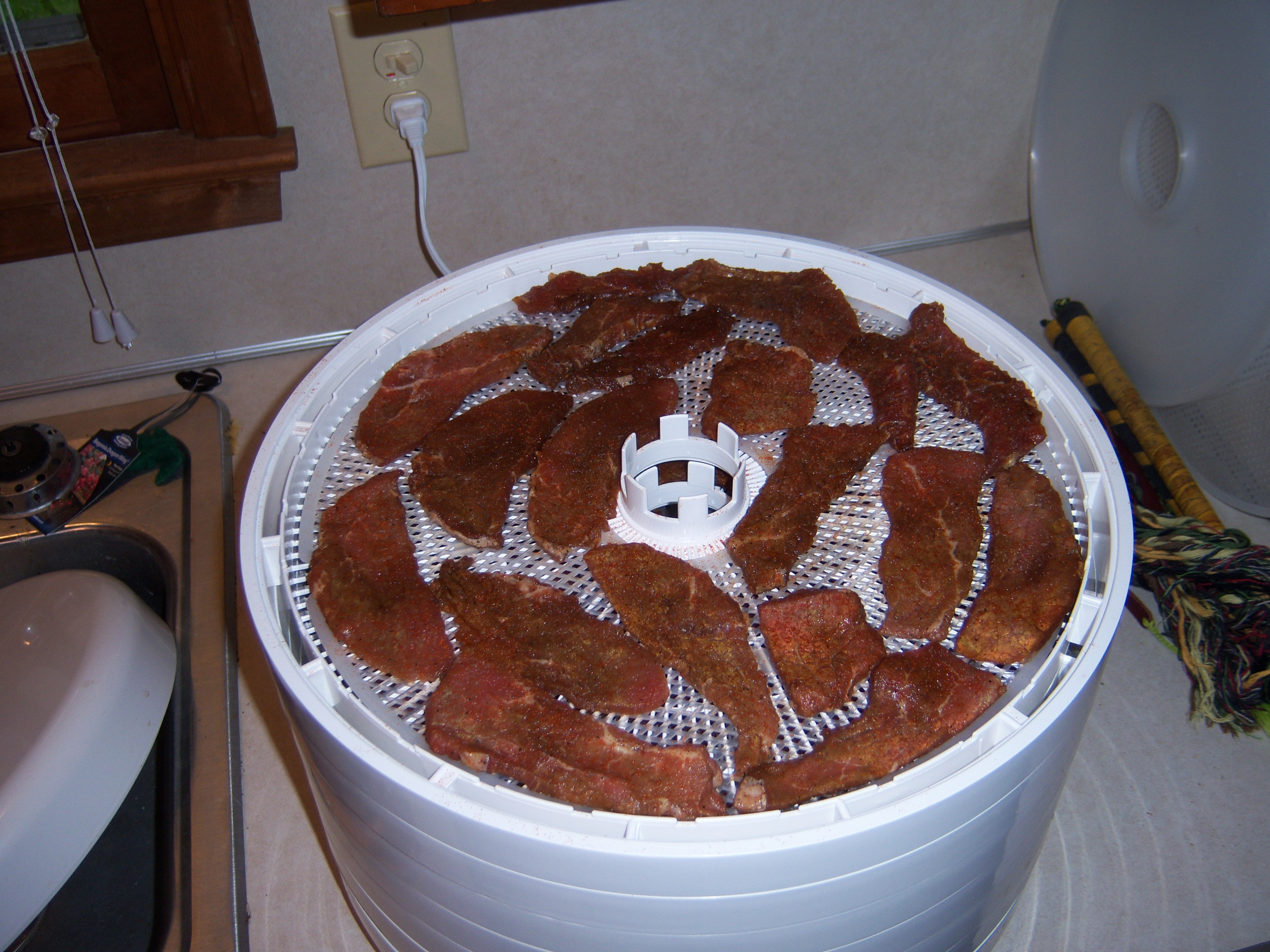
Raw meat before dehydration into jerky

After the jerky is dried to the proper moisture content to prevent spoilage, it is cooled and then packaged in (often resealable) plastic bags, either nitrogen gas flushed or vacuumed packed. The sealed packages usually contain small pouches of oxygen absorber to avoid fat oxidation. These small packets are filled with iron particles, which react with oxygen, removing the oxygen from the sealed jerky package and from an opened and resealed unfinished packet. Because of the necessary low fat and moisture content, jerky is high in protein. For example, a 30 g (about 1 oz) portion of lean meat contains about 7 g of protein. By removing 15 g of water from the meat, the protein ratio is doubled to nearly 15 g of protein per 30 g portion. In some low moisture varieties, a 30 g serving will contain 21 g of protein, and only one g of fat. The price per unit weight of this type of jerky is higher than less-dried forms, as it takes 90 g of 99% lean meat to generate 30 g of jerky. Unpackaged fresh jerky made from sliced, whole-muscle meat has been available in specialty stores in such places as Hong Kong at least since the 1970s. The products are purchased in kilograms, and customers choose from 10 to 20 types of meat used to make the product. Some are sold in strands instead of slices. Compared to the sealed packaged versions, unpackaged jerky has a relatively short shelf life. This type of jerky has also become very popular in convenience stores in the United States, where it is usually sold in clear plastic containers under the name "slab" jerky.

== Regulation ==
Most nations have regulations pertaining to the production of dried meat products. There are strict requirements to ensure safe and ethical production of jerky products. Factories are required to have inspectors and sanitation plans. The Food and Agriculture Organization of the United Nations (FAO) promote policies and establish measures and procedures to regulate dried meat products internationally.

=== European Union ===
The European Union (EU) prohibits the importation of meat products, including jerky, without additional and extensive customs documentation, and further inspections. European Union regulations on jerky, specifically biltong/jerky, focus on ensuring animal health and food safety. Imports are only allowed from countries or regions authorized for such imports, and these products must undergo specific treatments before entering the EU. Decision 2007/777/EC outlines the specific authorization requirements and treatments.

=== United States ===
In the United States, the U.S. Department of Agriculture (USDA) is responsible for that oversight. To comply with USDA regulations, poultry jerky must be heated to an internal temperature of 71 °C (160 °F) for uncured poultry or 68 °C (155 °F) for cured poultry to be considered safe.

== Nutrition ==
A typical 30 g portion of fresh jerky contains 10–15 g of protein, 1 g of fat, and 0–3 g of carbohydrates, although some beef jerky can have a protein content above 65%. Since traditional jerky recipes use a basic salt cure, sodium can be a concern for some people. A 30 g serving of jerky could contain more than 600 mg of sodium, which would be about 30% of the recommended USRDA.

== Market size and popularity ==
=== Global market ===
The global jerky snacks market size was valued at $5.66 billion in 2024. It is expected to reach $8.81 billion by 2033, exhibiting a compound annual growth rate of 4.79% from 2025–2033. North America dominates the market, holding a market share of over 50.0% in 2024.

=== US market ===
In the United States, sales of jerky snacks increased significantly, rising by 10.4% in 2024 to reach $3.29 billion. This growth can be attributed to the rising popularity of salty and spicy snacks and a growing interest in snackable protein sources. As a result, dried meat snacks have emerged as the fastest-growing category within the United States snack food market.

== Largest companies in the industry ==
=== Europe ===
The largest producer of beef jerky in Europe is The Meatsnacks Group (Valeo Foods). They are also a major producer of biltong, another type of dried meat snack. The company has expanded its product line to include salmon jerky.

=== North America ===
The largest beef jerky producer in North America is Link Snacks, Inc. (Jack Link's). It holds a significant market share in the US meat jerky production industry.

== As a military combat ration ==
Jerky, particularly beef jerky, is a common component of military combat rations, both historical and modern. It is included because it is a convenient, shelf-stable, and nutritious protein source that soldiers can easily carry and consume in the field. Jerky has been a staple in military rations for centuries due to its durability and ability to stay fresh without refrigeration. The Continental Army in the Revolutionary War era, for example, included salted meat and jerky as part of their rations when fresh food was scarce. It is also a common component of modern military rations, such as the Meal, Ready-to-Eat (MRE). Some variations of jerky are found in rations like the "First Strike Ration", specifically designed for initial deployment periods, providing an eat-on-the-move option. Jerky is lightweight, easy to store, and provides a concentrated source of protein and energy. It is also a great option for survival rations when fresh or prepared food is unavailable. While traditional beef jerky is common, military rations also include other variations such as turkey jerky and osmotically dried meat. Some experimental rations even include caffeinated jerky.

== Ch'arki ==
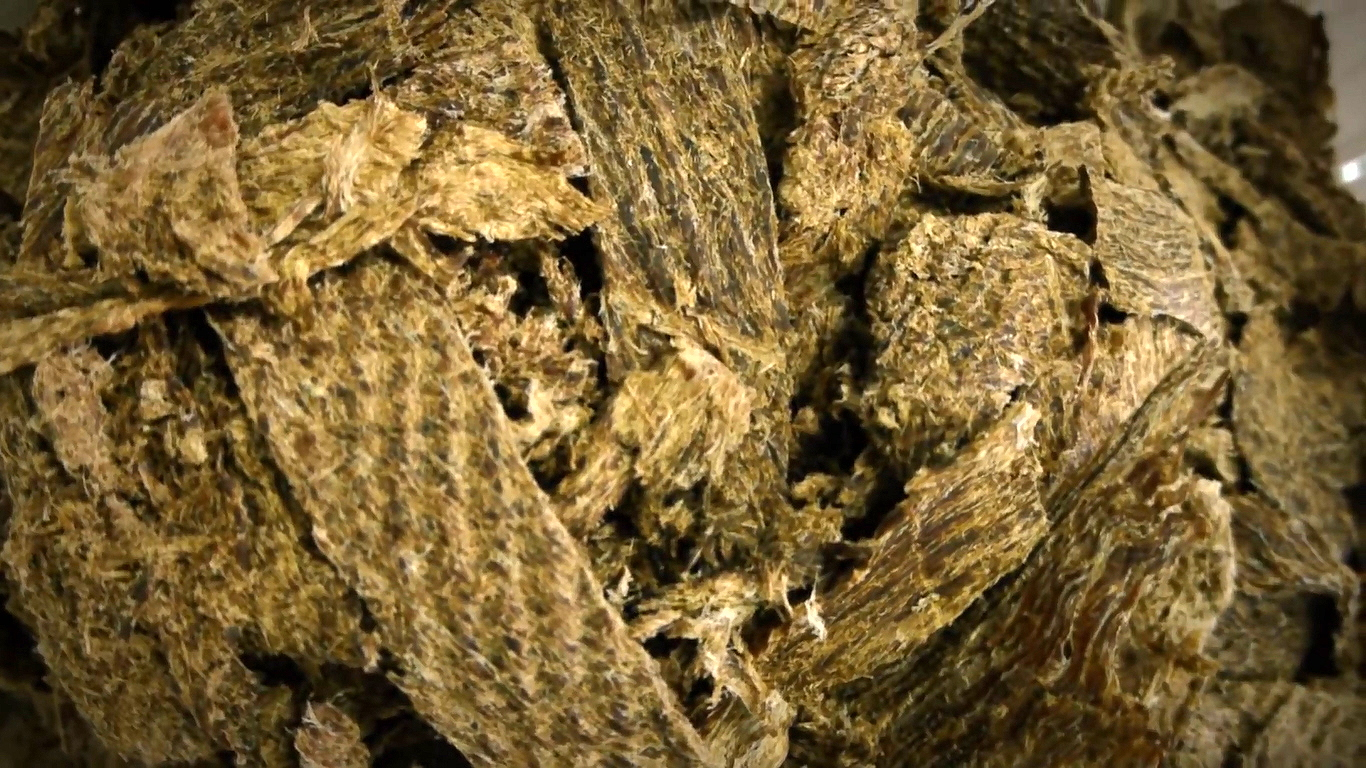
Ch'arki

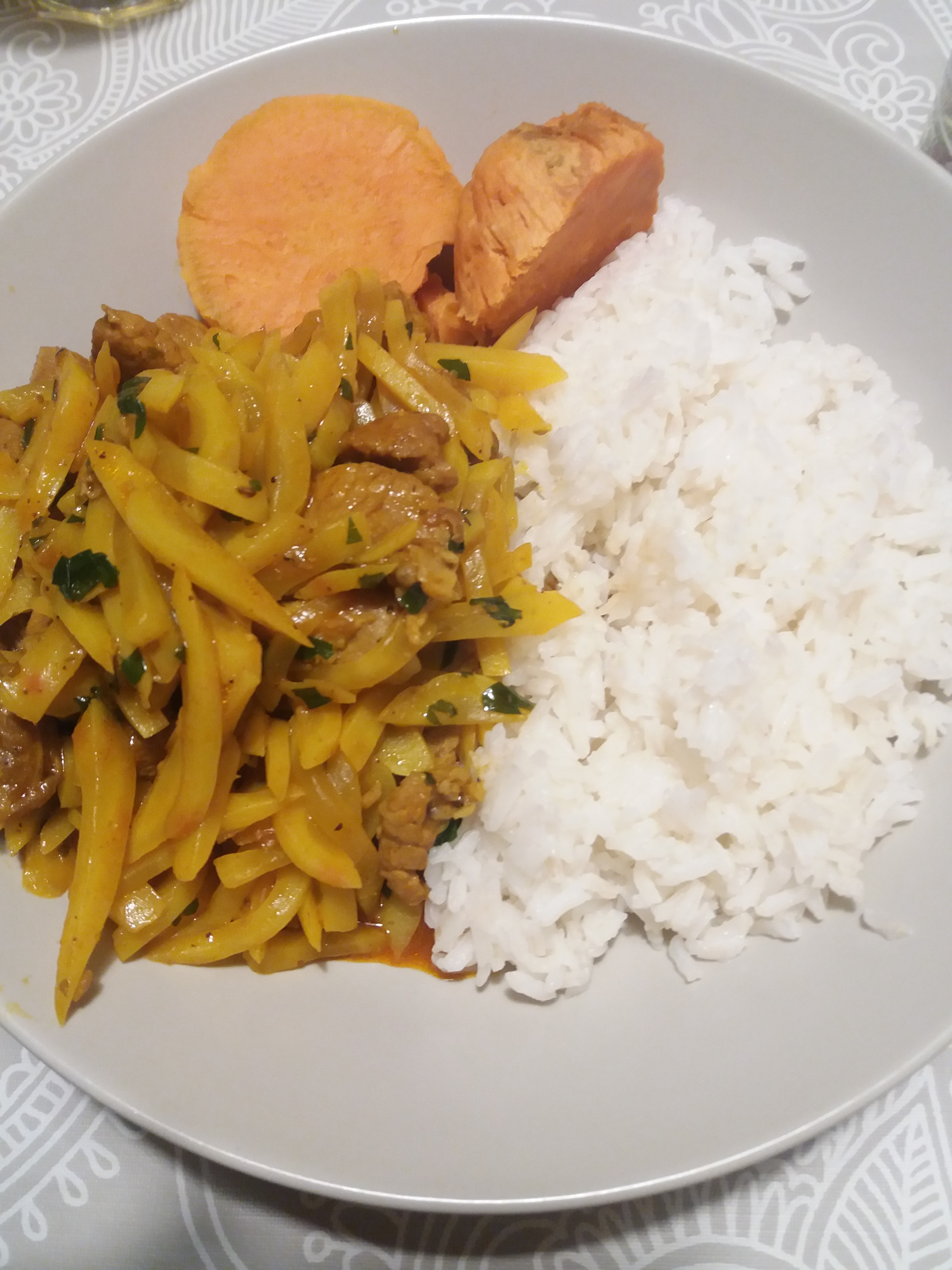
Peruvian olluquito with charqui

Ch'arki (Quechua for dried, salted meat; Hispanicized spellings: charque, charqui, charquí) is a dried, salted meat product. Andean charqui, made in Peru, Bolivia, and Chile, is from alpaca, llama, or alpaca-llama cross-breeds. Peru is the world's largest producer, producing approximately 450 tons annually. Brazilian charque is made from beef.

The manufacture of charqui principally consists of salting and sun-drying. In some regions, such as in Puno, the meat is sliced before drying. In others, like Cusco, the meat is dried from whole bone-in carcass pieces, known as charqui completo.

It was industrialized in charqueadas (in Brazil) or saladeros (in Argentina and Uruguay). In the United States ch'arki was Anglicised as jerky.

When encountered by the Spanish, the Inca Empire supplied tampu (inns) along the Inca road system with llama ch'arki for travelers. The Inca used a freeze drying process that took advantage of their cold dry mountain air and strong sun.

== See also ==
- Bakkwa – Salty-sweet dried meat product
- Biltong – Southern African air-dried cured meat
- Borts – Mongolian air-dried meat
- Carne seca – Mexican dried beef
- Cecina – Salted and dried or cured meat
- Dendeng – West Sumatran (Minangkabau) meat dish
- Jerky gun – Small handheld kitchen appliance
- Kilishi – Hausa dish of spiced dried beef, sheep, cow, chicken, mutton or goat meat
- Mojama – Andalusian cured tuna delicacy
- Pastirma – Spiced dried beef
- Pemmican – Food mix with long shelf life, sometimes used as survival food
- Salt pork – Salt-cured pork usually made from pork belly
- Seen Savanh – Laotian jerky made of beef
- Sukuti – Dried meat product from the Himalayas
