= Metworst =

Type of traditional Dutch sausage

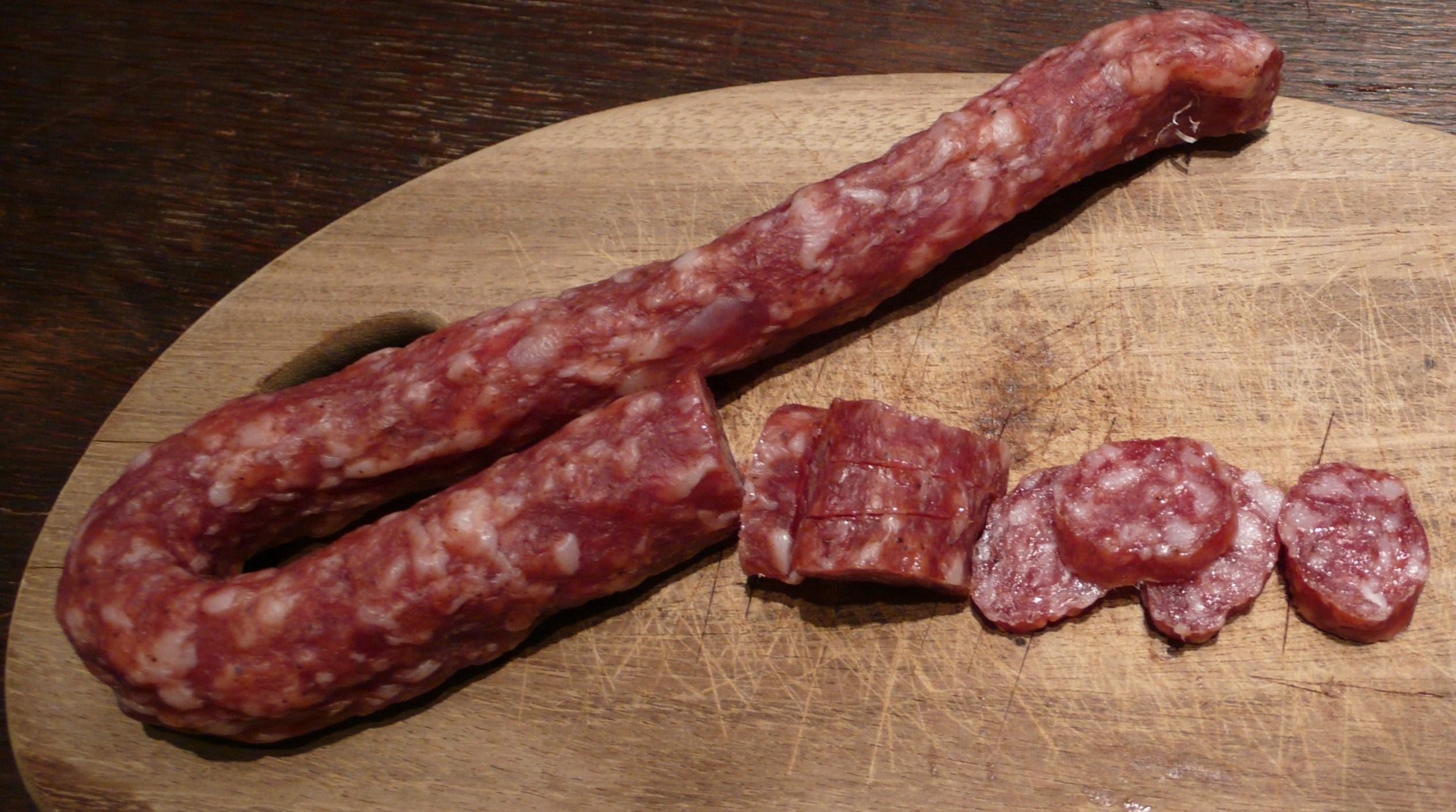
- A metworst from Groningen
- Alternative names: Droge worst
- Place of origin: Dutch
- Main ingredients: Minced pork

Metworst (Dutch pronunciation: [ˈmɛtʋɔrst]) or droge worst (pronounced [ˈdroːɣə ˈʋɔrst]; "dry sausage") is a type of traditional Dutch sausage. The sausages have a strong flavor, and are made from raw minced pork which is then air-dried.

Droge worst simply means "dry sausage", referring to the drying process and texture of the product. The name metworst (Met from the Low German word mett, "minced pork without bacon") is similar to the German Mettwurst, though only in name, as the taste and preparation of both sausage types are very different.

Metworst is traditionally found throughout the Netherlands and Flanders. Most of the production is in the northern provinces of the Netherlands—Groningen, Friesland and Drenthe—where wind conditions are most suitable for rapidly air-drying the sausages.

Finnish meetvursti resembles the Dutch metworst or salami: it is dry, hard, strong-flavored, dense, usually made of pork and eaten as a cold cut on bread. Some recipes, typically those sold as 'Russian style', include horse meat.

In Sweden, sliced medwurst sausage (boiled or smoked) is typically used on bread for breakfast.

Originally metworst, thanks to its preservability, served as an emergency meat supply to poor farmers in times of need or lack of fresh meat. As meat production gradually rose, the sausage began to be used as lunch for field laborers.

The sausage is the direct ancestor of the better-known South African droë wors, which is nearly identical in its manner of production, though the meats used are beef and mutton rather than pork.

== See also ==
- List of sausages
