= Kilishi =

Hausa dish of spiced dried beef, sheep, cow, chicken, mutton or goat meat

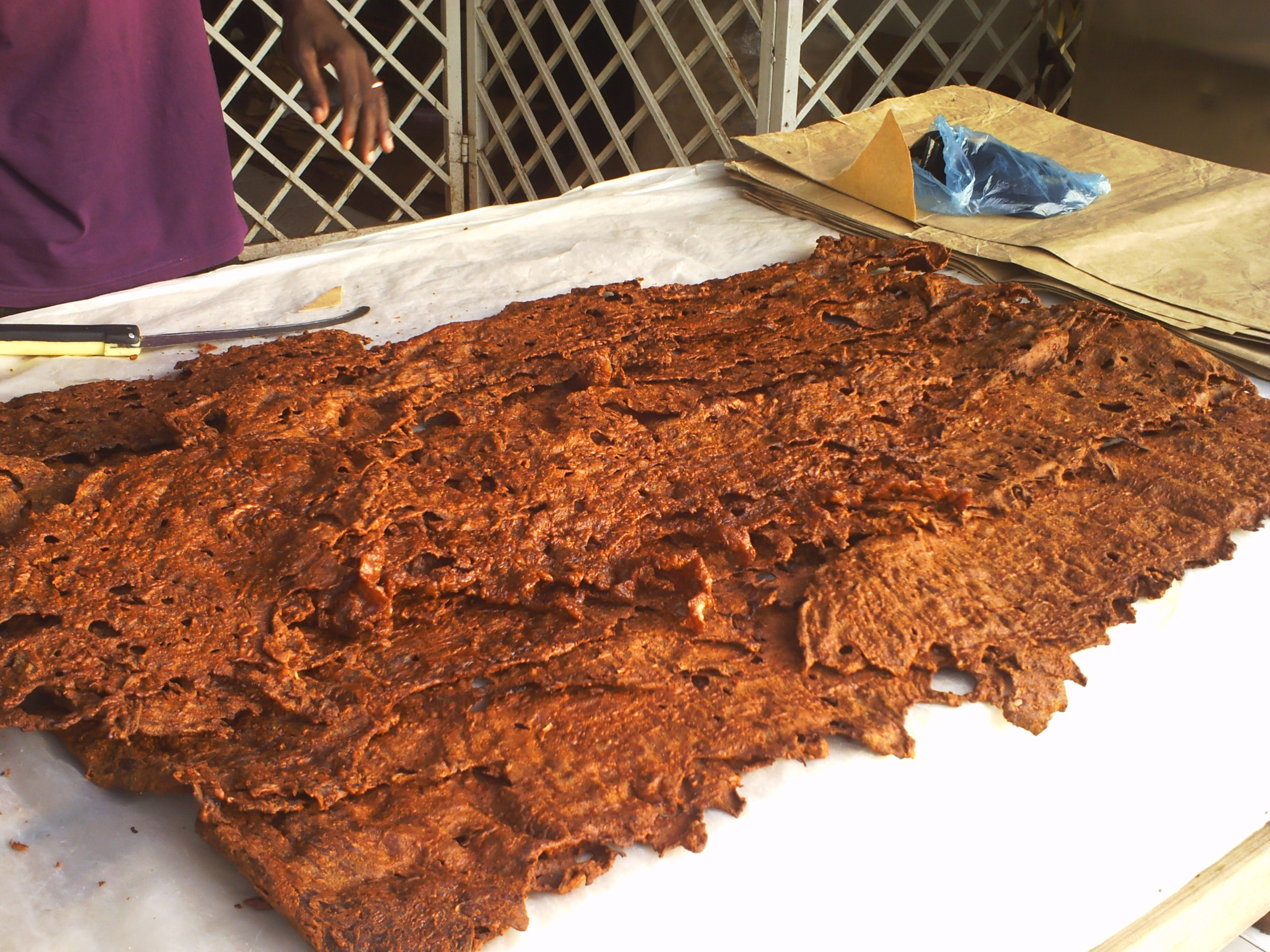
- Kilishi
- Alternative names: Kilichi
- Place of origin: Hausaland
- Main ingredients: Dried meat (cow, sheep or goat meat)
- Other information: Qwanta (Ethiopia and Eritrea)

Kilishi is a version of jerky that originates in Hausaland which consists of most of Southern Niger and Northern Nigeria. It is a form of dried meat, typically made with beef, lamb and mutton, or chevon. It is just like a dried form of Suya and it's produced from slabs of meat seasoned with salt, pepper and spices, smoked and dried. It is sun-dried to preserve it for long-term storage. It is a Nigerian delicacy commonly eaten with pap (akamu) and cassava flakes (garri).

== Origin ==
Kilishi might have originated in the period of Jihad, when cattle were moved to different areas for protection. Creating dried meats became a convenient way to preserve food and avoid spoilage. Kilishi, believed to have come from the Hausa people in Niger, has transcended its regional roots, gaining popularity throughout the entire Hausaland (Southern Niger and Northern Nigeria). Its appeal extends further, with widespread consumption in Nigeria, Cameroon and Chad, and across the broader region. Kilishi can serve as an appetizer, a main course or a side dish with its different textures and flavours.

== Preparation ==
It is prepared by drying thin strips of meat in the sun. Generally it is made with beef but can also be prepared from camel, lamb, and goat. These strips are then coated in a paste made from peanuts and various condiments and vegetables, such as onion, and multiple spices. The resulting product is left to dry for a few hours in the sun and then roasted for a few minutes over high heat. There are significant variations in preparation methods across the region. Kilishi was born out of necessity, to preserve meat for longer as the lean meat supplies protein enough for merchants traveling through the Sahara for trade.

Kilishi can be kept for months without much change in taste.

== Labu ==
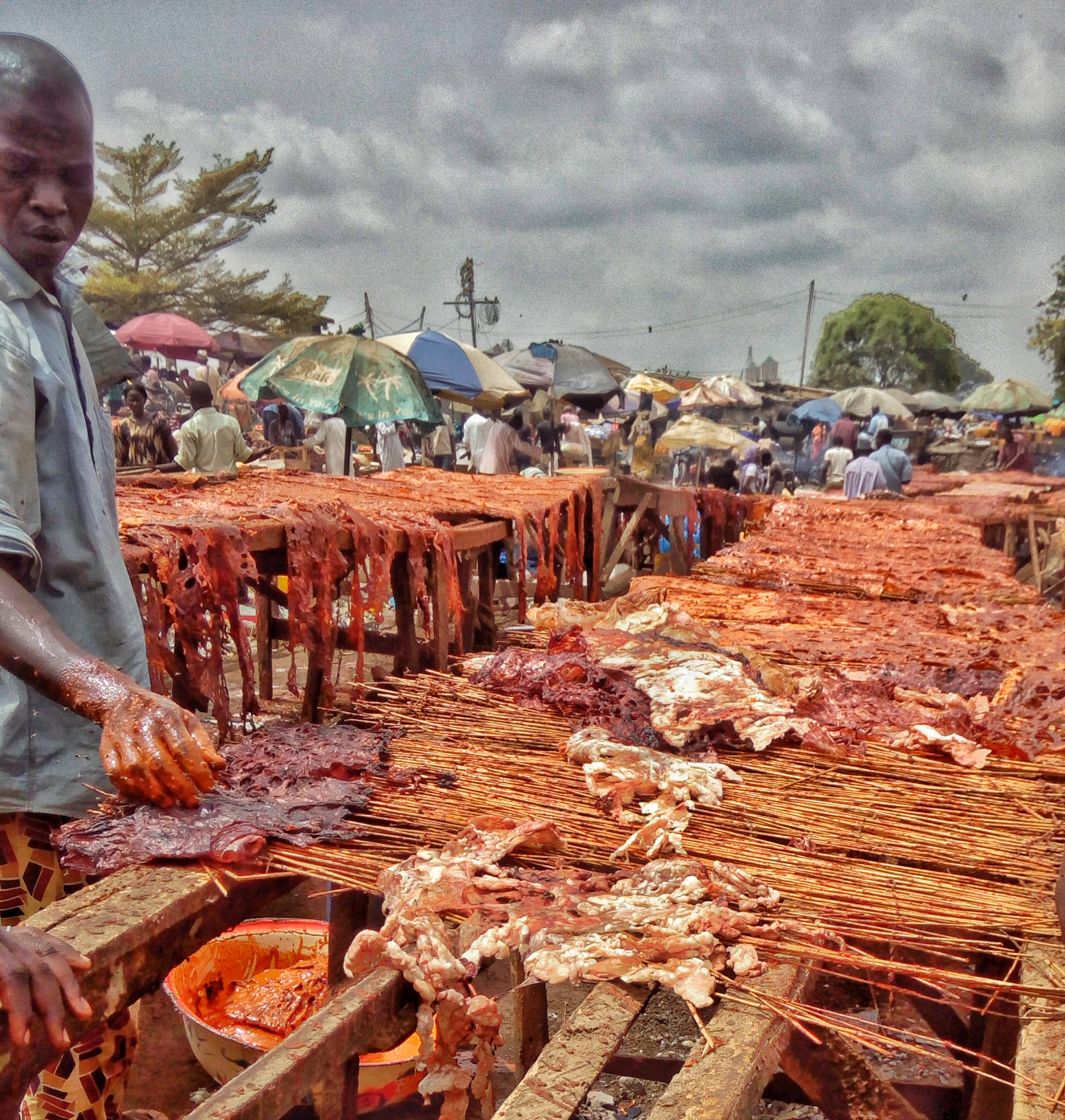
Kilishi drying in the sun (Nigeria).

The paste used in making Kilishi is called labu. It is prepared by diluting groundnut paste with water. Spices, salt, ground onions, and sometimes sweeteners such as honey are added for flavor. Date fruit are also added as sweeteners. The dried "sheets" of meat are then immersed one by one in the labu paste to coat them before being left to dry for hours.
