= Mojama =

Andalusian cured tuna delicacy

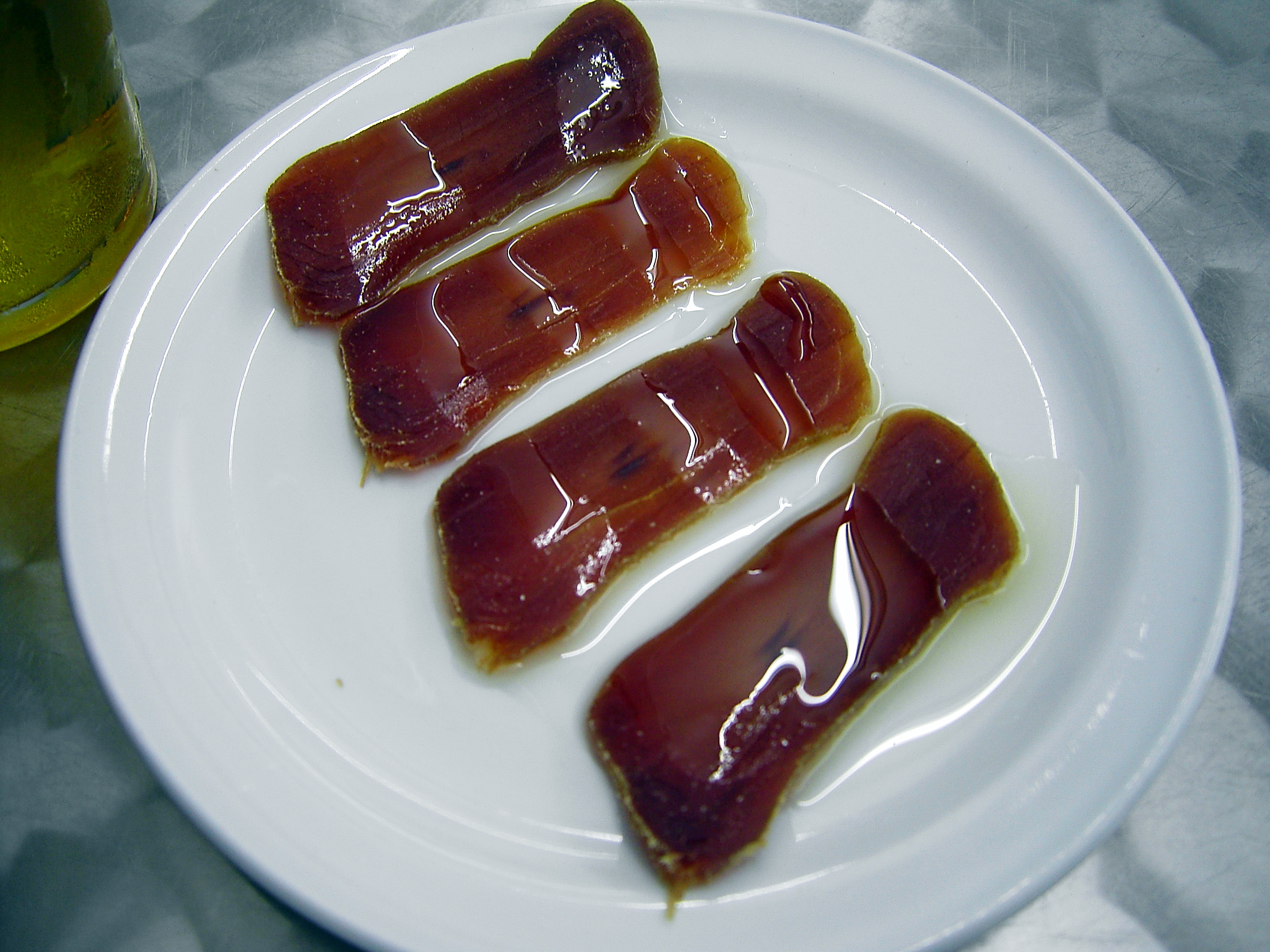
- Mojama
- Course: Appetiser
- Place of origin: Spain, Italy, Portugal
- Region or state: Valencia, Andalusia, Region of Murcia, Liguria, Sicily, Sardinia, Algarve,
- Serving temperature: Cold
- Main ingredients: Tuna

Mojama (Spanish pronunciation: [moˈxama]; Portuguese: muxama) is a Mediterranean delicacy consisting of filleted salt-cured tuna, typically found in the Murcia and Andalusia regions of Spain, particularly in Huelva and Cádiz or in Portugal in the region of Algarve. Bluefin and yellowfin tuna are the most common varieties used.

== Etymology ==
The word mojama comes from the Arabic musama (dry) or mušamma (made of wax) but its origins are Phoenician, specifically from Gdr (Gadir, Cádiz today), the first Phoenician settlement in the Western Mediterranean Sea. The Phoenicians had learned to dry tuna in sea salt to prepare it for trade.

== Preparation ==
Mojama is made using the loins of the tuna by curing them in salt for two days or between 18 and 36 hours. The salt is then removed and the loins are washed. Some producers compress the meat to better release moisture. The loins are then laid out to dry in the sun and the breeze (according to the traditional method) for fifteen to twenty days. The final product is a dark brown loaf.

== Serving ==
It is usually served in extremely thin slices with olive oil and chopped tomatoes or almonds (especially in Valencia). It can be served on bread or with pasta. In Madrid, mojama is a very common mid-afternoon tapa and is served with beer and olives. Mojama can also be paired with dry white or dry red wines.

== Nutrition ==
Mojama is high in protein and omega 3 fatty acids. It also contains B complex vitamins, magnesium, and vitamin D. However, mercury contamination in fish, particularly large, fat predatory fish like tuna, has raised significant concerns for consumers and health experts alike.
