= Venison =

Deer meat

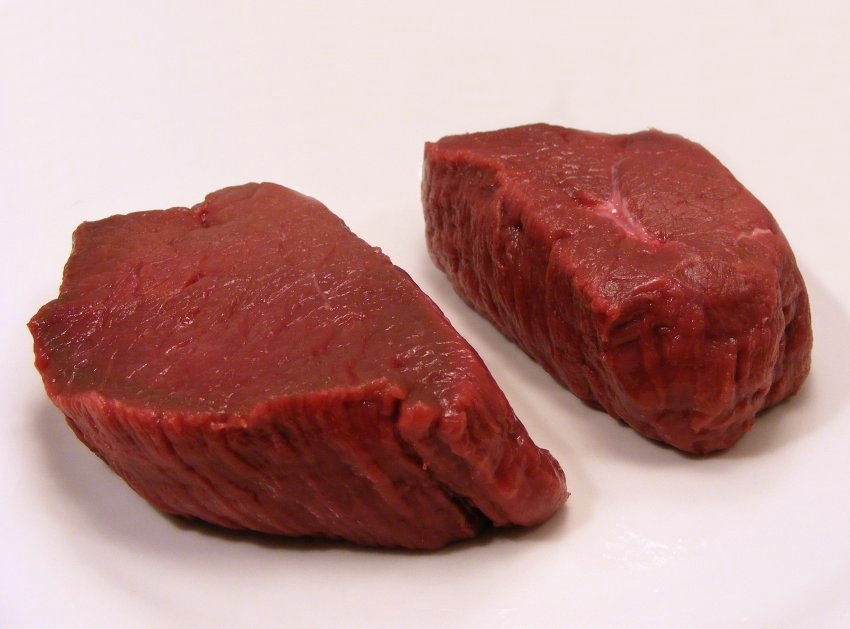
Venison steaks

Venison is a meat of deer (or antelope in South Africa). Venison can be used to refer to any part of the animal, so long as it is edible, including the internal organs. Venison, much like beef or pork, is categorized into specific cuts, and sizes including roast, sirloin, and ribs.

== Etymology ==
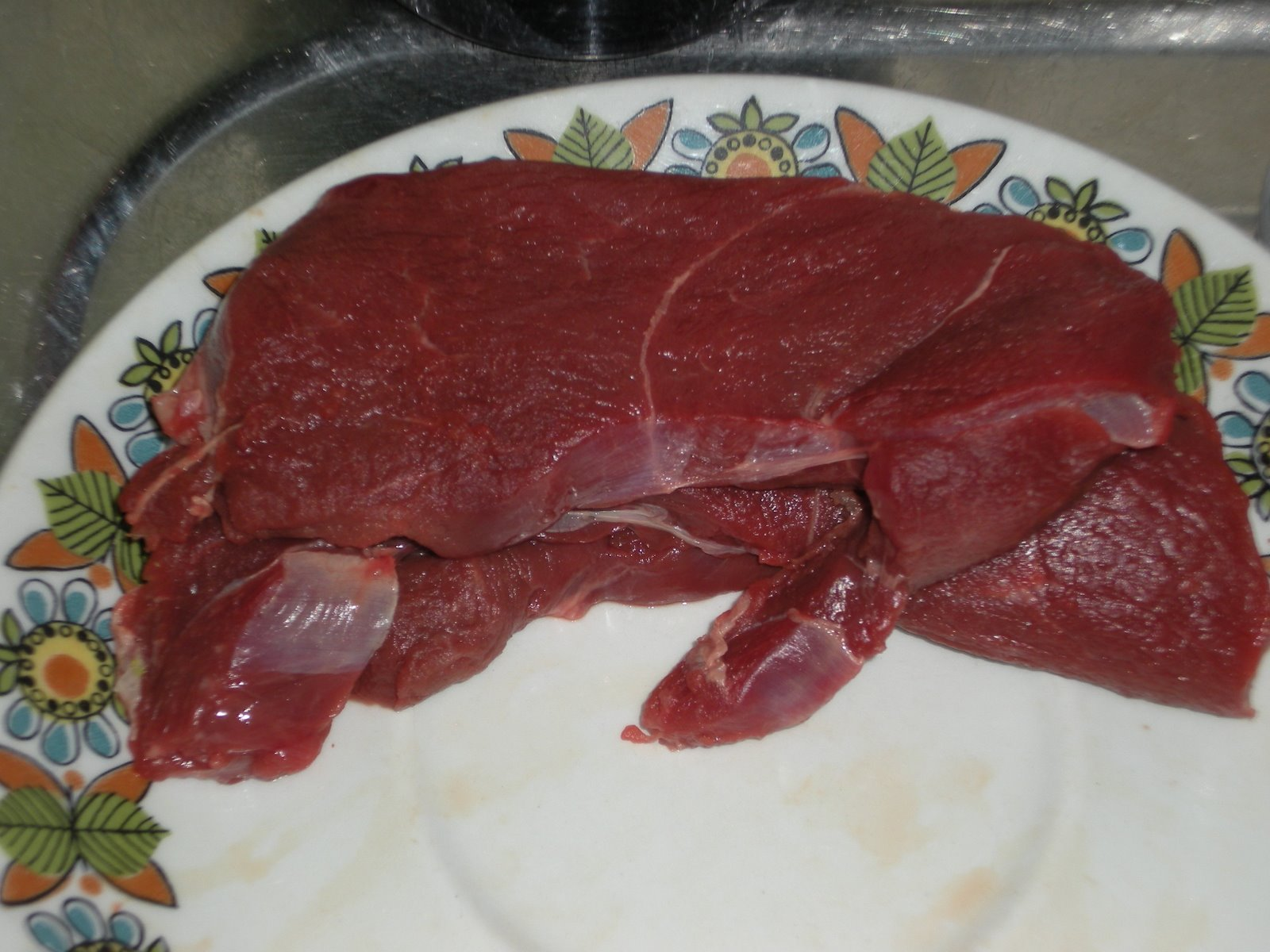
Raw venison escalope

The word derives from the Latin venari, meaning 'to hunt or pursue'. This term entered the English language through Norman French venaison in the 11th century, following the Norman Conquest of England and the establishment of Royal Forests.

== Definition ==
Venison originally described any meat obtained through the process of hunting a wild game animal. It was applied to any animal from the families Cervidae (true deer), Leporidae (rabbits and hares), Suidae (wild boar) and certain species of the genus Capra (goats and ibex).

In Southern Africa, the word venison refers to the meat of antelope, a Bovidae taxon, as there are no native Cervidae in Africa.

== Qualities ==
Venison may be eaten as steaks, tenderloin, roasts, sausages, jerky, and minced meat. It has a flavor reminiscent of beef. Cuts of venison tend to have a finer texture and be leaner than comparable cuts of beef. However, like beef, leaner cuts can be tougher as well. Venison burgers are typically so lean as to require the addition of fat in the form of bacon, beef, olive oil, or cheese to achieve parity with hamburger cooking time, texture, and taste. Organ meats (offal) of deer can also be eaten. Traditionally, they are called umbles (from the Middle English noumbles). This is supposedly the origin of the phrase "humble pie", meaning a pie made from the organs of a deer.

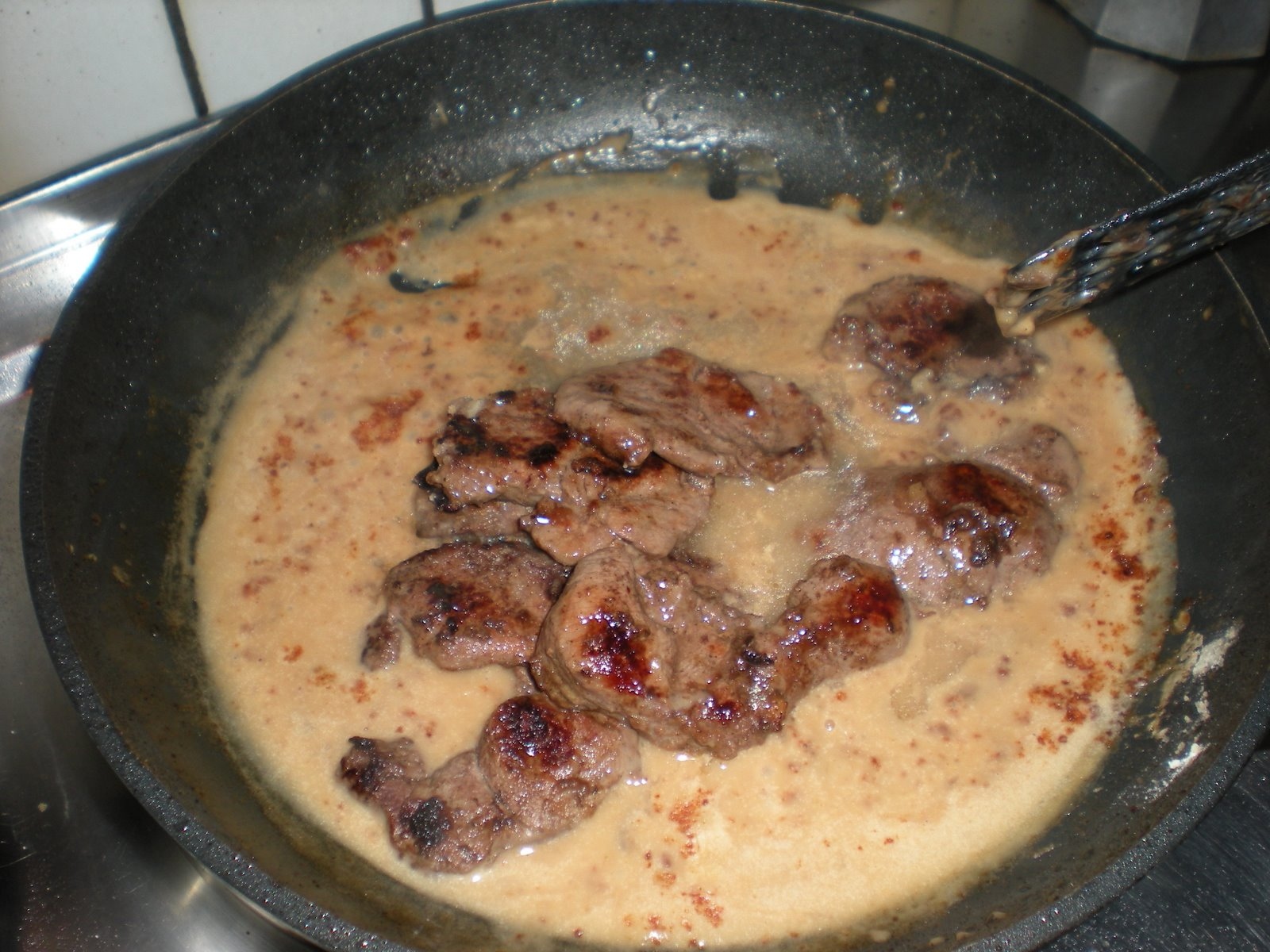
Venison escalope cooking in sauce

== Health benefits and concerns ==
When sourced correctly from a healthy deer, venison can be a very healthful meat for human consumption. Wild deer live on a natural diet of grass and wild plants without ever being confined to a cage or injected with any artificial hormones. This results in a muscle composition which accumulates a highly concentrated profile of vitamins, minerals, and complete protein. Venison is also higher in moisture and lower in calories, cholesterol, and fat than most cuts of grain-fed beef, pork, or lamb.

However, since it is unknown whether chronic wasting disease (CWD) – a transmissible spongiform encephalopathy among deer – can pass from deer to humans through the consumption of venison, there have been some fears of dangerous contamination of the food supply from wild deer carrying CWD. The disease has been found among farmed deer in the US and western Canada, but New Zealand has not identified the disease among its herd.

According to the Centers for Disease Control and Prevention (CDC), the Toxoplasma gondii parasite can also be transmitted through human consumption of undercooked or raw venison if it did not reach an internal temperature of 145 °F (63 °C) for whole pieces of meat, or 160 °F (74 °C) for ground venison. The CDC also says that freezing meat for several days in sub-zero (0 °F or −18 °C) temperatures can greatly reduce the chances of infection by toxoplasmosis.

Hunters should briefly observe the behavior of the living animal they intend to take and not shoot a deer that appears sick or is acting strangely. They are also advised to take general precautions in examining the meat from a deer they have killed.

== Availability ==
=== Czech Republic ===
Venison (as well as other game meats, mainly wild boar) is a part of the traditional cuisine of the country and is commonly eaten, not considered a specialty. Dishes such as deer goulash are often on restaurant menus. A variety of venison (roe, red and fallow deer, mouflon) and other game meat is widely available in butcher shops in fresh state, distributed by wholesalers, as well as in big retail chains, such as Tesco, at prices similar to beef or pork, around 200 CZK or 8 EUR per kilogram. Despite the popularity and low prices, in recent years the production of venison has surpassed demand, and is therefore often used in production of animal food.

=== New Zealand ===
New Zealand has large populations of wild and farmed deer, making venison a relatively common meat. It is widely available in supermarkets.

=== United Kingdom ===
In England, hunting rights were restricted in an effort to preserve property rights. As a result, the possession and sale of venison was tightly regulated under English law, although it is readily available commercially.

=== United States ===
In the United States, venison is less common at retail due to the requirement that the animal first be inspected by USDA inspectors. There are very few slaughterhouses which process deer in North America, and most of this venison is destined for restaurants. Where deer are considered an invasive species, some companies (Molokai Wildlife Management and Maui Nui Venison, which hunt axis deer in Hawaii) combine culling with USDA certification and retail sale. Most retail venison in the United States is farmed from New Zealand and Tasmania. It is available through some high-end specialty grocers and chains which focus on more "natural" meats. Non-retail venison is often obtained through hunting, and either self-processed or contracted to small meat processing facilities. Sale of the finished meat is usually illegal.
