= Bresaola =

Air-dried and salted beef

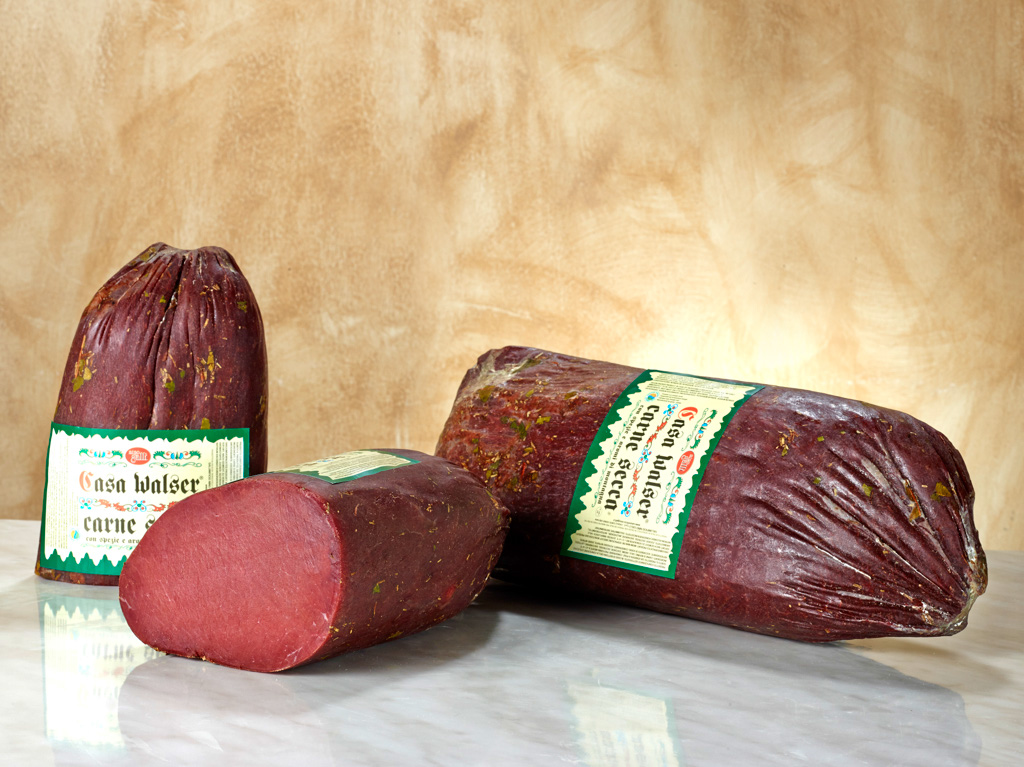
Bresaola della Valtellina

Bresaola (Note: /brɛˈzaʊlə/ breh-ZOW-lə, /brɪˈzoʊlə/ briz-OH-lə, UK also /brɛˈsaʊlə/ bress-OW-lə, US also /brɛˈsoʊlə/ bress-OH-lə, Italian: [breˈzaːola].) is air-dried, salted beef (but it can also be made of horse, venison, and pork) that has been aged two or three months until it becomes hard and turns a dark red, almost purple colour. It is made from top (inside) round, and it is lean and tender, with a sweet, musty smell. It originated in Valtellina, a valley in the Alps of northern Italy's Lombardy region.

The word comes from the diminutive of Lombard bresada ('braised').

== Serving ==
As an appetiser (antipasto), bresaola is usually sliced paper-thin and served at room temperature or slightly chilled.

== See also ==
- List of dried foods
- List of smoked foods
