= List of magazines in Greece =

The following is an incomplete list of current and defunct print (or online) magazines published in Greece. They may be published in Greek language or in other languages.

== A ==
- ΑΕΛΛΩ (published by Yacht Club of Greece)
- Αεροναυτική & Άμυνα
- Αεροπορική Ιστορία (Airplane History; defunct)
- Αέροπος
- αθηΝΕΑ (Athinea)
- Αθηνόραμα (Athinorama)
- Αμυνα και Διπλωματία
- Άμυνα και Τεχνολογία
- Αμυντικά Θέματα
- Αμυντική Βίβλος
- Αμυντικοί Φάκελοι
- Αντί (Anti; defunct)
- Ανεξήγητο (Anexigito; defunct)
- Artviews
- Avopolis
- Αρχαιολογία (Archeology)
- Athens Voice
- Look Mag (for women, By Athens Voice)
- Men Voice (for men, By Athens Voice)
- Home Voice (for home and design, By Athens Voice),
- Avaton
- Advertising
- Antivirus'
- A-Z Αρτοποιία – Ζαχαροπλαστική (A-Z Bakery - Confectionery)
- Ambrosia

== B ==
- Βαβέλ (Vavel; defunct)
- Βαβυλωνία (Babylonia)
- Big (defunct)
- Billboard Greece
- Biscotto
- Βλάβη
- Best 10
- Burda Style - Greece, Greek Edition

== C ==
- Close Up (defunct; published by Αγγελιοφόρος newspaper)
- Cockpit
- Cogito
- City Mag Thess
- Coffee+Brunch
- Cook Book (defunct; published by Ethnos newspaper)
- Cosmopolitan (defunct)
- Crash (defunct)
- Cityrider
- Σινεφιλία (Cinephilia)
- eCommerce News
- Connected Business World

== D ==
- Dairy News
- Dapper Dan
- Defence Net
- Δίαυλος (Diaulos; defunct)
- Διοτίμα (Diotima)
- Disabled.GR
- Δίφωνο (Difono; defunct)
- Δούρειος Ίππος
- Down Town
- Design Society
- Digital Life
- Δορυφορικά Νέα (Doriforika Nea)

== E ==
- Economistas
- Ελέκτορ
- Ελληνική Αγωγή (Elliniki Agogi)
- Ελληνικό Πανόραμα (Elliniko Panorama; defunct)
- Ελληνόραμα
- Ελλοπία
- Επιλογές (defunct; published by Makedonia newspaper)
- Επτά Ημέρες (Epta Imeres; published by Kathimerini newspaper)
- Esquire (defunct)
- Εφοπλιστής (Efoplistis)
- Εξώστης (Exostis)

== F ==
- Focus (defunct)

== G ==
- Γαστρονόμος (published by Kathimerini)
- Γευσιγνώστης (defunct; published by To Vima)
- Γεωτρόπιο (published by Eleftherotypia)
- Γλυκές Αλχημείες (Glykes Alximies)
- Glow
- Golden Dawn
- Greece Is (English edition, published by Kathimerini)
- GR Traveller
- Grill Magazine
- Γυναίκα (Gynaika Magazine)
- 4 Green
- GB Magazine

== H ==
- Ήχος Εικόνα (Sound and Picture; defunct)
- Χάρτης (Hartis)
- Hot Doc
- Hip Hop
- Greek Hotelier (published by the Hellenic Hoteliers Federation - HHF)

== I ==
- Ιστορία εικονογραφημένη (Illustrated History; defunct)
- Ιστορικά (published by Eleftherotypia)
- Ιστορικά Θέματα (History Subjects; defunct)
- Ιστορία (History)
- Iχώρ (Ιchor; defunct)

== J ==
- Journals (various Journals with digital format) by the National Documentation Centre (EKT)

== K ==
- Κ (published by Kathimerini newspaper)
- Klik

== L ==
- Λαβύρινθος (defunct)
- Η λέξη (I lexi)
- Lifo
- The Leisure Architecture Issue (published by LiFO)

== M ==
- Madame Figaro
- Μaκεδονικά (Makedonika)
- Mancode
- Μαστορέματα (Mastoremata)
- Mauve - life in art (defunct)
- Maxim (defunct)
- Μάχη & Επιβίωση
- MAXMAG
- Men (defunct)
- Men's Health (defunct)
- Meat Place
- Miky Maous
- Μονόκλ
- Modelling (defunct; Scale model magazine)
- Μοντελιστής (Montelistis; defunct; Scale model magazine)
- Μυστική Ελλάδα (Mistiki Ellada; defunct)
- 01 (zero one; defunct)
- Marketing Week
- Μετρονόμος (Metronomos)

== N ==
- Ναυτικά Χρονικά (Nautical Chronicles)
- National Geographic
- Νέα Εστία (Nea Estia)
- Νέμεciς (defunct)
- Νέος Επιστήμονας (New Scientist; defunct)
- Nitro
- Nomas Magazine

== O ==
- Οδός Πανός (Odos Panos)
- Οινοχόος (Oinoxoos; published by Kathimerini)
- Οικονομικός Ταχυδρόμος (Oikonomikos Taxidromos)
- Olive
- One Man
- Out (defunct; by Δάφνη Επικοινωνίες)

== P ==
- Parallaxi
- Playboy
- PCMag
- Πενταπόσταγμα
- Περίπολος
- Περισκόπιο της Επιστήμης (defunct)
- Φωτογράφος (Photographos)
- Πλανόδιον (Planodion)
- Πολάρ (Polar)
- Πόλεμος & Ιστορία
- Pop & Rock magazine
- Πόρφυρας (Porfiras)
- Πτήση (Flight; defunct)
- Πρακτορείο (Praktorio)
- Πτήση & Διάστημα (Ptisi & Diastima)
- Το Περιοδικό (The Magazine)
- Ψητό

== R ==
- Ραδιοτηλεόραση (Radiotileorasi)
- Rocking

== S ==
- Sorbet (defunct)
- Σινεμά (Cinema; defunct)
- Status (defunct)
- Strange (defunct)
- Στρατηγική
- Στρατιωτική Ισορροπία & Γεωπολιτική
- Στρατιωτική Ιστορία (Army History; defunct)
- Σύγχρονος Στρατός
- Snack & Coffee

== T ==
- Tar
- Thess Voice
- Τεχνική Εκλογή
- 4Τροχοί (4 trochoi)
- Τροχοί & ΤIR (Troxoi & Tir)
- Τρίτο Μάτι (Trito Mati; defunct)
- Τρόφιμα & Ποτά (Food & Beverage; published by Triaina Publishing SA)

== V ==
- ΒΗΜΑgazino (published by To Vima)
- Vogue Greece

== W ==
- White Paper
- Wine Plus Magazine

== See also ==
- List of newspapers in Greece
