= Arapian =

Market in Athens, Greece

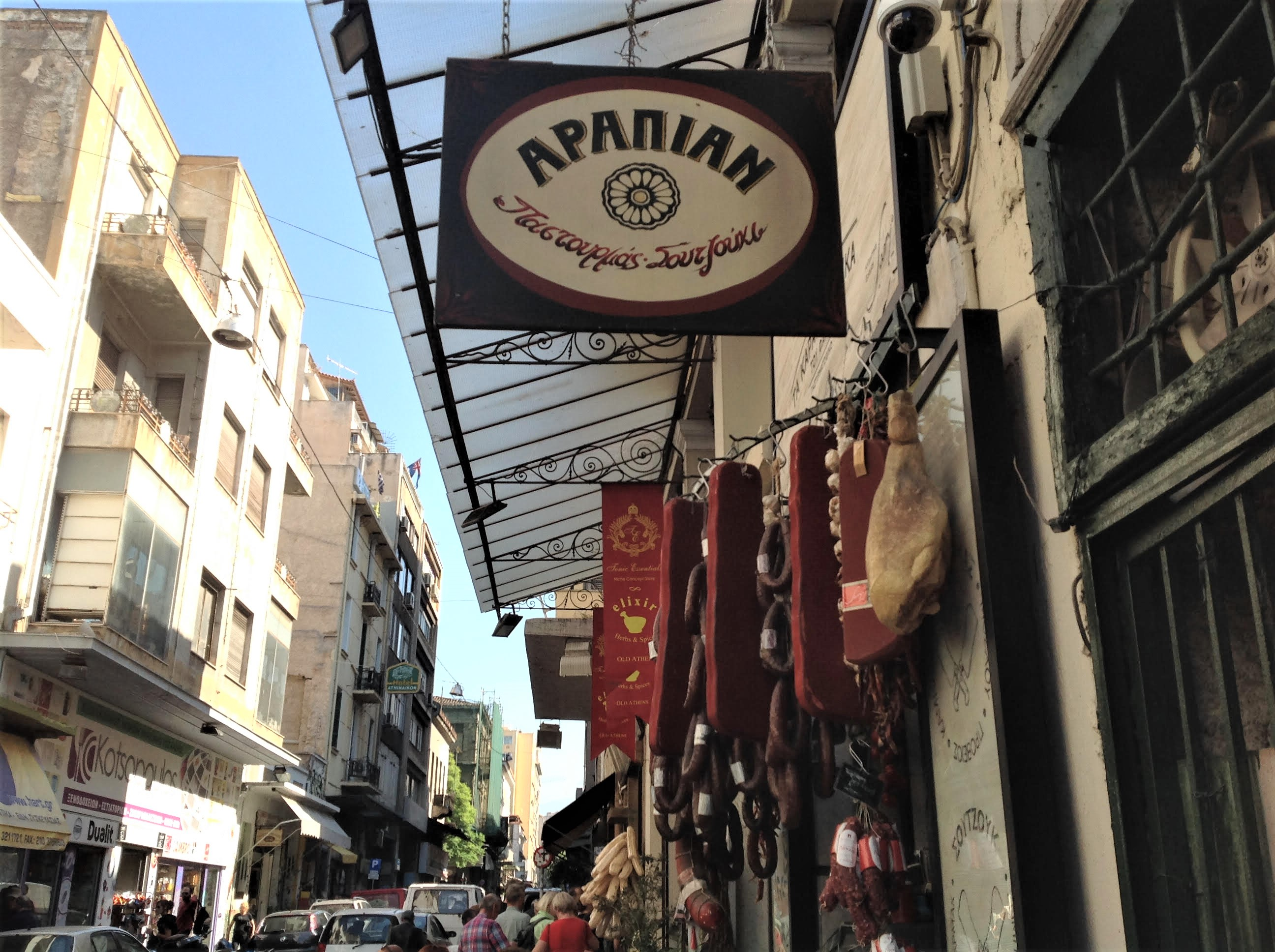
- Arapian in Athens
- Native name: Αραπιάν
- Founded: 1935
- Founder: Sarkis Arapian
- Headquarters: Athens, Greece
- Number of locations: 41 Evripidou Street
- Products: pastourma and soutzouki
- Owner: Fanis Theodoropoulos
- Website: www.arapian.gr

Arapian (Greek: Αραπιάν) is a famed pastourma and soutzouki charcuterie business and market in Athens, Greece. The market has been in operation since 1935. Arapian, as well as its neighbour Miran Pastourma, are considered two of the historical establishments of Athens.

== History ==
The company was founded in 1935 by Sarkis Arapian, an Armenian refugee who escaped his native Kayseri during the Asia Minor Catastrophe. He eventually managed to settle in Athens, Greece and opened a pastourma and soutzouki charcuterie on 41 Euripidou Street. In 1965, Sarkis Arapian appointed Dimitris Theodoropoulos as his business partner. The shop is currently in its third generation of management, as it remains in the hands of the Theodoropoulos family, which is now managed by Dimitris's son Fanis. The size of the shop is currently 15 m^{2}.

Under the management of Fanis Theodoropoulos, the company has moved its production facilities in Prosotsani, Drama beneath the Falakro mountains in order to be surrounded by a more natural environment.

In an interview with Kathimerini, Fanis Theodoropoulos mentions that he tries to design new products for the younger generation and also introduce them to the traditional products that their parents consumed.

== Reception ==
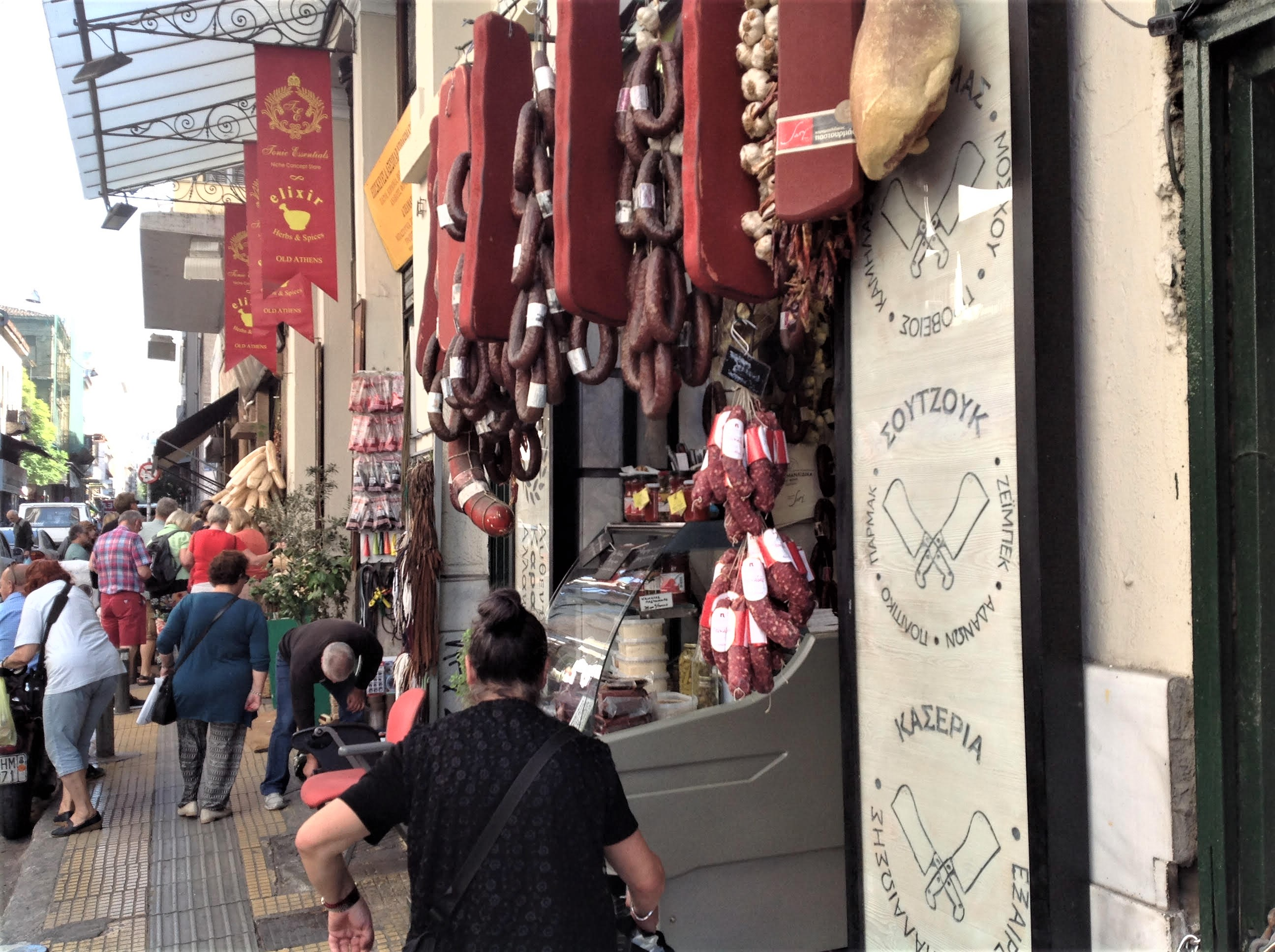
Arapian exterior detail

I Kathimerini praises Arapian for the quality products and good service. The paper describes the company's produce as excellent snacks for connoisseurs and also mentions that Arapian uses no preservatives for its products. A Christmas article from the paper titled "The ritual of pastourmas" mentions that Arapian's pastourma is a sine qua non for a Christmas table and that the annual "pilgrimage" to the store is on their agenda, remarking on Arapian's old-recipe pastourma, cut in thin, almost transparent slices with or without fat.

Lifo magazine praises the quality of the Arapian products and the care for selecting the ingredients and meat which come from various locations in Greece. The variety and flavour of the products is also praised as "reminiscent of another era" which are guaranteed to please the consumer. Lifo marks out both Arapian and Miran Pastourma as the market's best sources for such speciality meats. Lifo's Νiki Mitarea calls green-pea soup with Arapian's sausage and fried egg, served at restaurants in Athens, a "classic dish". Gastronomos online calls the same dish a "tasty dynamite for gourmets".

According to an article by Athens Voice, Arapian is famous for its Eastern delicacies. The article finds the aged cheese of Xanthi, sold at Arapian's, to be at the top of the taste scale and makes similar evaluations for the pastourma, goat sausage, soutzouki and kavourma. It is also mentioned that Fanis Theodoropoulos provides his customers with gourmet-related advice. Arapian's offers free tasting of food samples of their products. Athens Voice ranks Arapian's tasting service as the best in Athens and its readers are advised to "consume responsibly".

Arapian's louza or loutza, a kind of sausage made of pork sirloin found in the Cyclades and also Cyprus, and apaki smoked sausage made of pork marinated in vinegar and a traditional Cretan sausage, are on the list of recommended products by Kathimerini.

Internationally, Arapian's store is featured in Jamie Oliver's cookbook Jamie does... Spain, Italy, Sweden, Morocco, Greece, France where the Naked chef is seen, in a two-page spread, posing in front of the store.

== Products ==
Arapian currently serves the following products:

- Petalo (horseshoe) soutzouki
- Kaftero soutzouki (hot spicy)
- Boiled soutzouki.
- Rahi Pastourma
- Soutzouki Karamandlika
- Leg Pastourma
- Corfu noumboulo of Venetian origin made by the Corfiote charcuterie.
- Greek and foreign salami
- Louza from Tinos
- Bison meat
- Kavourmas
- Handmade cured meat from Drama, Greece
- Istanbul soutzouki cured in air
- Old caseri cheese from Xanthi
- Kayseri pastourma pie
- Kavourmas chasapaki (little butcher) from Serres
- Cheese in oil from Zakynthos
- Pastourmadela (a combination of pastourma and mortadella)
- Apaki smoked sausage marinated in vinegar

== Awards ==
- 2010-2011 Award of Distinction from Gourmet magazine

== See also ==
- Armenians in Greece
- Apikoğlu Brothers
- Miran Pastourma
