= Miran Pastourma =

Pastirma and sujuk market in Greece

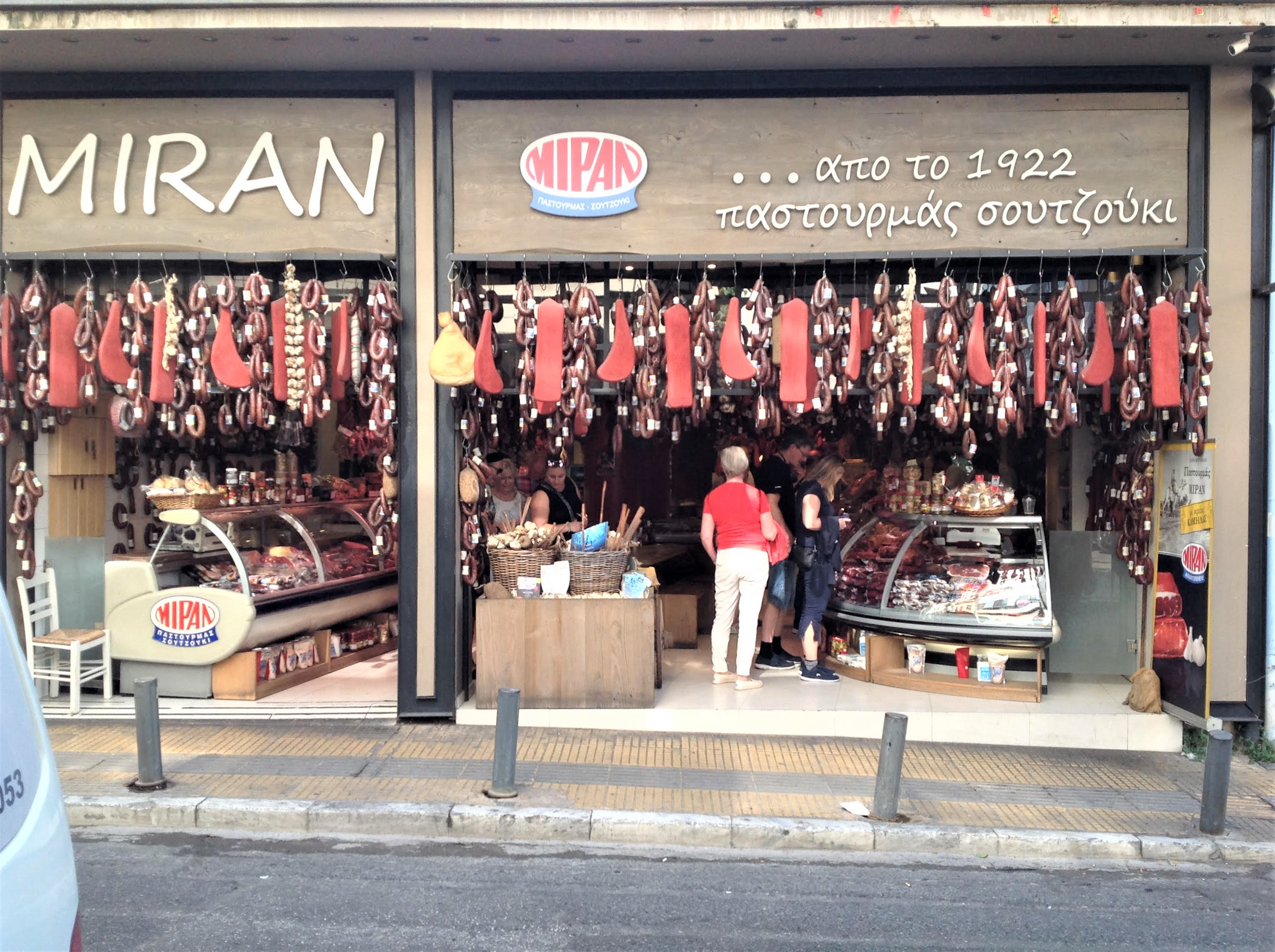
- The store in Athens
- Native name: Μιράν παστουρμάς
- Founded: 1922
- Founder: Miran Kourounlian
- Headquarters: Athens, Greece
- Number of locations: 45 Evripidou Street
- Products: pastourma and soutzouki
- Owner: Miran and Krikor Kourounlian
- Website: www.miran.gr

Miran Pastourma is a pastourma and sujuk charcuterie business and market in Athens, Greece. The market has been in operation since 1922. It is considered the charcuterie of the connoisseurs. Despite the Greek economic crisis, Miran is expanding its business and has doubled in size to accommodate increased demand. The founder of the shop, Miran Kourounlian, is thought to be the man who brought pastourma to Athens for the first time. Miran is considered the largest company of its kind in the European Union. The flavour of pastourma coming from the historical enterprise permeates Euripides Street in the centre of Athens. Miran and its neighbor Arapian Cold Cuts are considered two of the historical establishments of Athens. Miran has been in the same spot in Euripidou Street since its opening in 1922. Miran is the recipient of multiple gourmet prizes.

== History ==
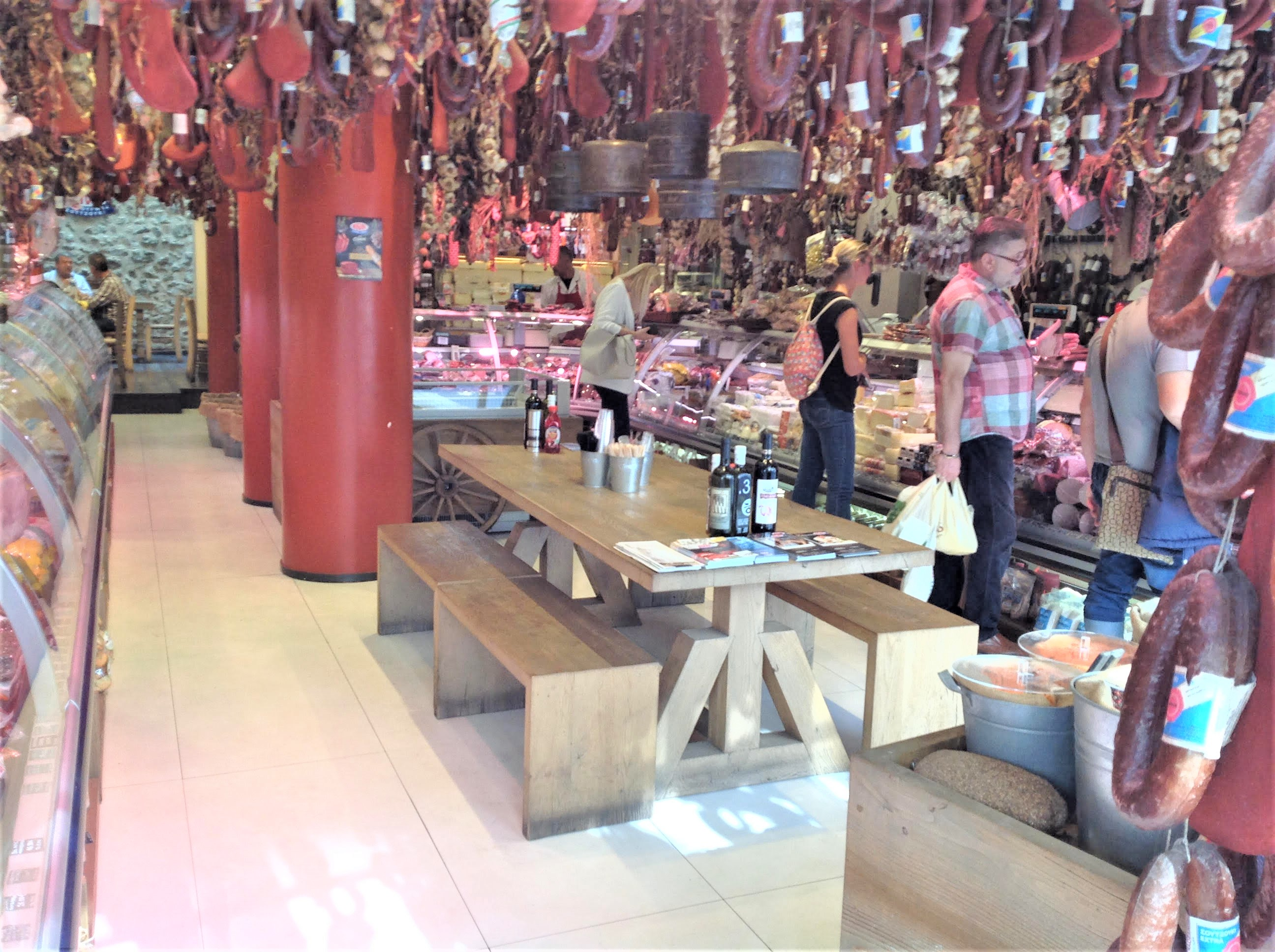
Miran interior

The Miran Pastourma market was founded in Athens in 1922 by Miran Kourounlian, a refugee of the Armenian genocide who managed to escape to Constantinople from his native Kayseri. He eventually settled in Athens, Greece via Chios and then Peiraias. At the time, Miran Kourounlian was already experienced in making pastirma and sujuk and decided to establish a self-named charcuterie business on 45 Evripidou Street near the Omonoia Square of Athens.

The market soon became popular throughout Athens, as it was one of the few pastourma and soutzouki sellers in the city. The company became even more popular when Miran Kourounlian's son Bedros took over management in 1960 and began distributing the products throughout Greece. The store originally occupied an area of 3 m^{2}. In 1983 Bedros expanded the Miran product factory to 1300 m^{2}. After the death of Bedros in the 1990s, the family business was passed to his heirs, brothers Miran and Krikor Kourounlian, who manage the business today.

== Today ==
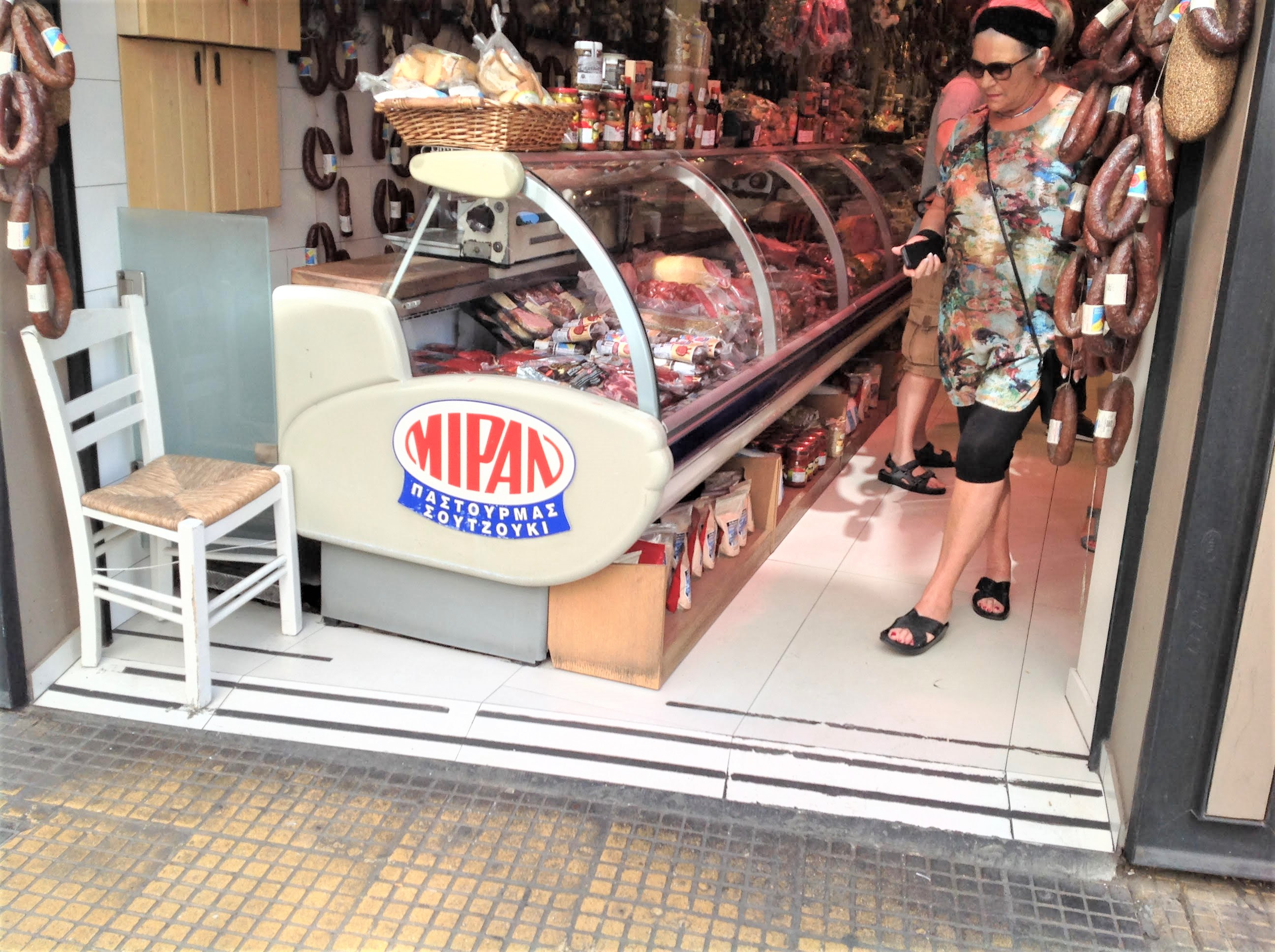
Miran pastourmas exterior detail

Miran Pastourma serves pastourma and soutzouki in its original location on 45 Evripidou Street. In 1994, the third generation of the Kourounlian pastourma makers has started a further expansion of the business both inside Greece and to the European Union. Under the management of Miran and Krikor Kourounlian, the company obtained a European Union export code in 1994. It is now distributing products throughout the European Union and other countries. Miran has taken control of the Athens store while his brother Krikor oversees the factory, which produces between seven and ten tons of processed meat products yearly.

According to current manager Miran Kourounlian, the company's success is due to its traditional preparation methods and the quality of the beef, which is superior overall to that found in Greece, since it is imported from Argentina. He believes that Greek meat lacks a "consistent quality". Miran Kourounlian has stated in an interview that some of the customers of his store have been patrons since the 1940s and 1950s.

Miran has continued to grow despite Greece's economic crisis, doubling in size. To celebrate the occasion, the grandson of Miran along with his brother Krikor and their father Bedros organised a party where they introduced their new product, pastourma made of camel meat.

Milan's products include imported and Greek processed meats, cheese and spices. The Kourounlians have also signed agreements with similar enterprises in Europe under which the foreign enterprises will tailor their recipes according to the Miran product specifications so that their products will appeal to Greek consumers. The company's products can now be found in major Greek supermarket chains. A postal-delivery system for their products has been established to reach the internal Greek market. The delivery is free inside Greece and the meat is packed in special polystyrene packaging with dry ice to preserve freshness.

== Reception ==
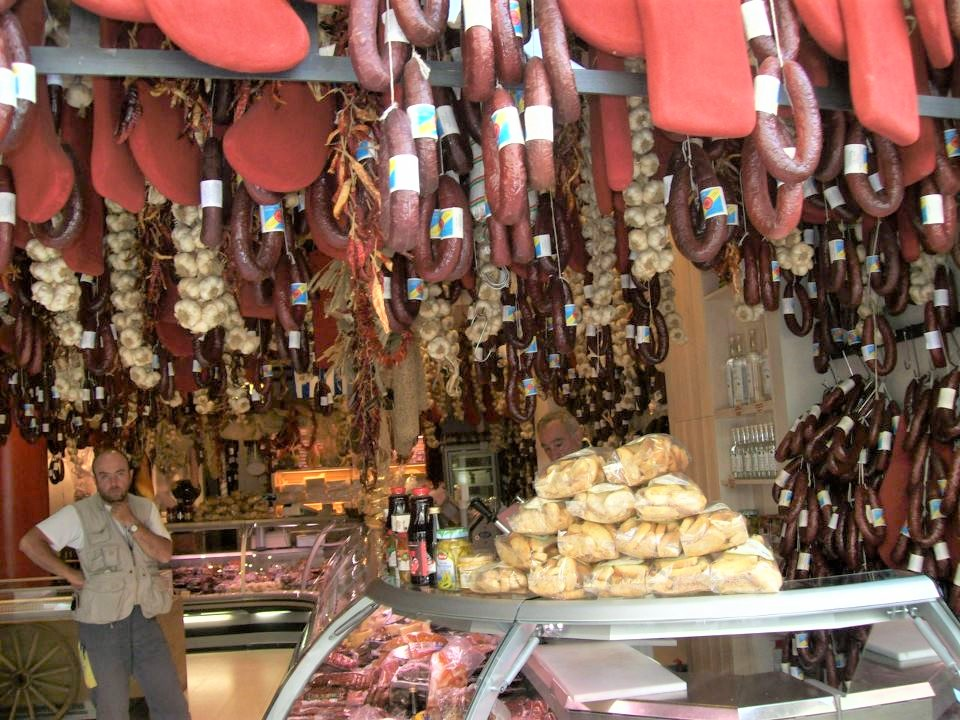
Miran Pastourma is also known for hanging pastourma and soutzouki from the ceiling

The Greek edition of Elle magazine includes Miran's charcuterie in its list of the best of its kind.

According to the Ethnos newspaper, Miran's meat for pastourma has been described as excellent. Ethnos and Elle praise Miran for cutting the pastourma by hand rather than with a cutting machine. Miran is also commended for aging the meat naturally and not in a warehouse.

Real Taste and Style magazine praises Miran Pastourmas as "the historical place for those seeking rare tastes" and "an art which started with Miran Kourounlian and which has been continued by his progeny". The same magazine mentions that the Miran store is found in the best tourist guidebooks for Athens.

Lifo magazine describes Miran as the "Mecca of soutzouki" and mentions that the Miran soutzouki is made from lamb as well as beef and has been mixed with all the "beautiful and hot spices of planet Earth".

== Prizes ==
- Gold medal for soutzouki.
- Gold medal for rural sausage of partial maturation.
- Silver medal for pastourmas.
- Eleftherotypia Gourmet Prize.

== Products ==
Miran products include:

- Soutzouki from Kayseri
- Soutzouki
- Braided Hungarian sausage
- Frozen and fresh pastourma pies
- Pastourmas without tsimeni
- Pastourmas made from turkey meat
- Κavourmas
- Smoked chicken filet
- Beef pastrami with pepper and coriander
- Smoked beef tongue
- Buffalo kavourmas
- Buffalo sausage
- Buffalo steak
- Smoked steak
- Pontic smoked cheese
- Smoked Beroia cheese
- Sifnos cheese

== See also ==
- Armenians in Greece
- Apikoğlu Brothers
- Arapian
