= David Nachmias =

Greek musician

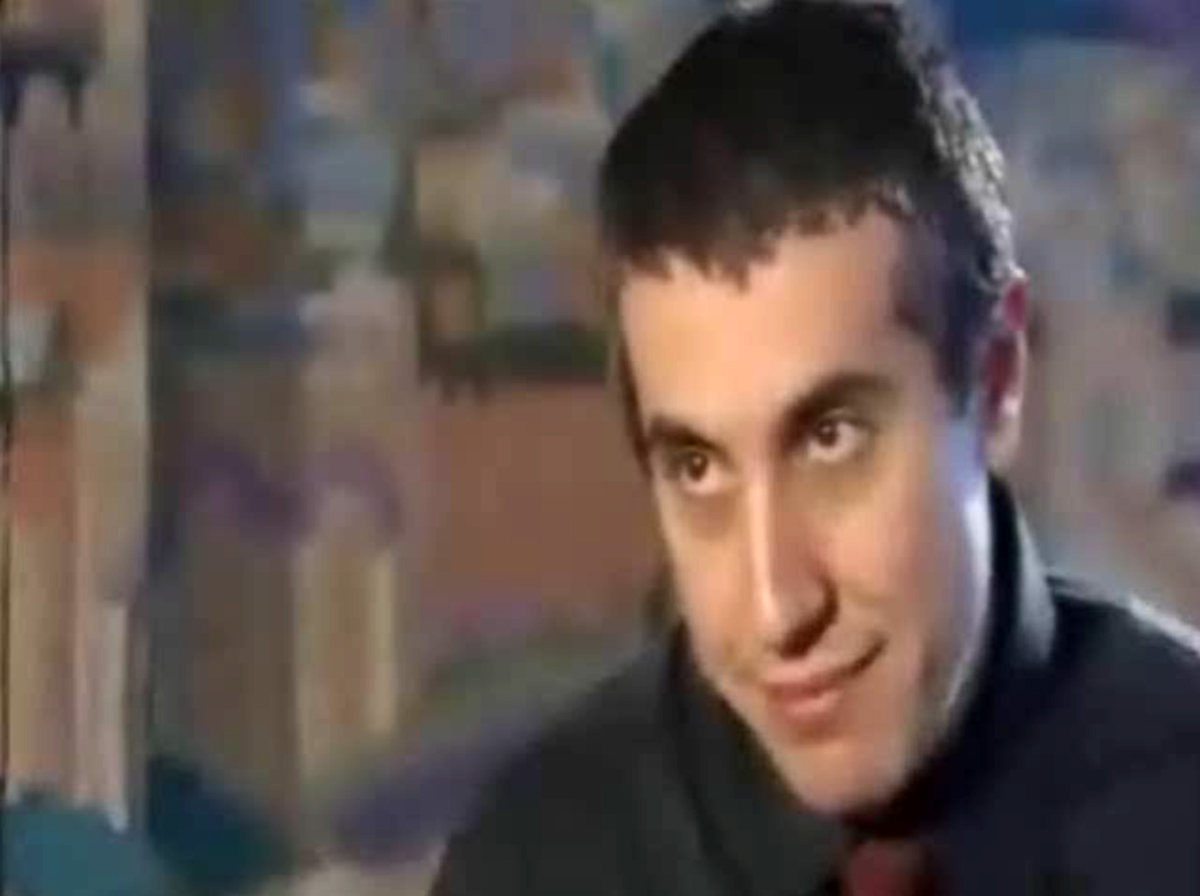
David Nachmias in 2007

David Nachmias (Δαυίδ Ναχμίας) is a Greek musician and cultural figure.

== Early life and education ==
David Nachmias was born on 19 March 1966 in Bombay, India, to a Greek family and was raised in Athens.

He attended the American Community School Athens for six years and later St. Lawrence College. He earned a bachelor's degree in psychology from the University of La Verne. Alongside his academic studies, he spent 15 years studying piano, music theory, and orchestration at the National Conservatory of Athens. On 19 December 2024, he was honored with the Prize for Letters and the Arts by the Academy of Athens.

== Career ==
=== On radio ===
Nachmias began his broadcasting career in 1988–1989 as a co-presenter with actress Mary Chronopoulou on TOP FM radio. From 2001 to 2002, he worked with Trito Programma, the Greek National classical music station.

Currently, he hosts a daily radio program dedicated to vintage Greek music on Trito Programma 90,9, part of the Hellenic Broadcasting Corporation.

=== On television ===
In 2001 he directed and presented two weekly TV shows entitled Ihnilates (tracers) and Timis Eneken (honoris causa) on the Greek National Television channel. He interviewed more than 200 Greek cultural figures including poet Antonis Fostieris, poet Manolis Pratikakis, poet Katerina Anghelaki-Rooke, actor Kostas Kazakos, Greek National Opera baritone Themis Sermie and shadow theatre artist Evgenios Spatharis.

He also directed and presented several documentaries on historic cultural personalities including singer and composer Nikos Gounaris, lyricist Pythagoras Papastamatiou, composer Michalis Souyioul, actress Sapfo Notara, movie director Orestis Laskos and military officer Mordehai Frizis.

=== Interwar songs ===
Since 2001, he has been involved in Greek nostalgic music, particularly songs from the early twentieth century. He has arranged songs from original sheet music for contemporary orchestras.

He has performed alongside singers such as Hrysoula Stefanaki, and Sia Koskina.

In September 2010 and 2011 Nachmias organized a vintage Greek music show at the Houston Grand Opera under the auspices of Hellenic Cultural Center of the Southwest, performing Hrysoula Stefanaki.

== Discography ==
=== 2007 Attik Tribute ===
Produced by Protasis Music, organized and orchestrated by David Nachmias, the CD includes 18 songs by the foremost Greek composer Attik (1885–1944) performed by Nena Venetsanou, Maria Kanelopoulou, Thanos Polydoras, Hrysoula Stefanaki, Gogo Vaghena, Pandelis Psyhas, Babis Tsertos and Themis Andreadis.

=== 2010 From Attik to Gounaris (Greek vintage songs compilation) ===
Greek vintage song selection covering the period 1901 to 1959. Singers Maria Kanelopoulou, Hrysoula Stefanaki, and Thanos Polydoras, perform famous songs of Nikos Gounaris, Danai, Hristos Hairopoulos, Alekos Sakellarios, Mihalis Sougioul, Kostas Giannidis, Cesare Andrea Bixio, Nikos Hatziapostolou, Leo Rapitis and Sofia Vembo. This CD is a live recording.
