= Sotirios =

Sotirios (Greek: Σωτήριος) or Sotiris (Σωτήρης) is a male given name of Greek origin, meaning "salvation" (σωτηρία, σωτήριος). Sotiria (Σωτηρία) is the female version of the name. It's equivalent of "Salvatore" in Italian and "Salvador" in Spanish. It may refer to:

== People ==
=== Politicians and statespersons ===
- Sotirios Hatzigakis (born 1944), Greek politician and former government minister
- Sotiris Kouvelas (born 1936), Greek politician and former government minister
- Sotirios Krokidas (1852–1924), former Prime Minister of Greece
- Sotirios Sotiropoulos (1831–1898), former Prime Minister of Greece

=== Writers and journalists ===
- Soterios Johnson Greek-American radio journalist, host of National Public Radio's Morning Addition for the New York City area on WNYC
- Sotiris Kakisis (born 1954), Greek poet, translator, journalist, lyricist and screenwriter
- Sotiris Trivizas (born 1960), Greek poet, essayist and translator

=== Musicians ===
- Sotiria Bellou (1921–1997), Greek singer and performer of the Greek rebetiko style of music
- Sotis Volanis Greek singer

=== Actors ===
- Sotiris Moustakas (1940–2007), Greek comic actor born in Cyprus

=== Sportspersons ===
- Sotiris Balafas (born 1986), Greek footballer
- Sotiris Kaiafas (born 1949), retired Cypriot footballer
- Sotirios Kyrgiakos (born 1979), Greek footballer
- Sotiris Leontiou (born 1984), Greek footballer
- Sotiris Liberopoulos, Greek footballer
- Sotirios Moutsanas (born 1958), retired Greek middle distance runner
- Sotiris Nikolaidis, retired Greek basketball player
- Sotiris Ninis (born 1990), Greek footballer
- Sotirios Versis (1879–1918), Greek weightlifter and Olympic athlete
- Sotiris Ieremiadis (born 1988), Greek race driver

=== Other people ===
- Sotiris Bletsas, Greek architect and Aromanian language activist
- Sotria Kritsonis, (born 1949) American public advocator
- Sotiris Kovos (born 1965), Greek automobile designer
- Sotirios Panopoulos (1934–2017), inventor of the Hawaiian pizza
- Sotiris Xantheas, Laboratory Fellow in the Advanced Computing, Mathematics and Data Division at Pacific Northwest National Laboratory

== Other uses ==
- Sotirios, a ship originally named Empire Piper
