= Trivizas =

Trivizas is a Greek surname. Notable people with the surname include:

- Eugene Trivizas (born 1946), Greek sociologist and children's author
- Sotiris Trivizas (born 1960), Greek poet, essayist and translator
