= Historia de un Amor (song) =

Song written and composed by Carlos Eleta Almarán

"Historia de un Amor" (Spanish for "Love Story") is a song about a man's old love written by Panamanian songwriter Carlos Eleta Almarán. It was written after the death of his brother's wife. It is also part of the soundtrack of a 1956 Mexican film of the same name starring Libertad Lamarque. The song tells of a man's suffering after his love has disappeared. It holds the world record as the most popular song to be translated and sung across the world in various languages by various singers from the Americas, Europe, Asia, and Africa.

== Cover versions ==
"Historia de un Amor"

Single
- Released: 2015
- Recorded: 2015
- Studio: h
- Genre: Bolero
- Label: Sony, Syco, Columbia
- Songwriter: Carlos Eleta Almarán
- Producer: Julio Reyes Copello

The song was first recorded in Argentina as a tango by Héctor Varela and his orchestra along with singer Rodolfo Lesica.

This song has been sung or played by many artists, including Guadalupe Pineda, Daniela Anahí Bessia, Dalida, Irvys Juarez, Mietta, Julio Angel, Viguen, Eydie Gormé & Trio Los Panchos, Los Paraguayos, Nicola Di Bari, Abbe Lane, Lola Flores, Julio Iglesias, Angélica María, Nana Mouskouri, George Dalaras, Hrysoula Stefanaki, Perez Prado, Pilita Corrales, Cheb Hasni, Laura Fygi, Iva Zanicchi, Lisa Ono, Mietta, Dizzy Reece, Pedro Infante, Lucho Gatica, La Mafia, Ana Gabriel, Luis Miguel, Florin Salam, Bruna Marlia a.k.a. Manola Ruiz, Luz Casal, Yasar, Cesária Évora, Lili Boniche, Los Tres Ases, Dany Brillant, Eartha Kitt, Krystyna Janda, Stanisława Celińska, Sargis Maghakyan Sr., Zaz (singer), Il Volo, Felipe Pirela, Miri Mesika, Diego El Cigala, Margarita Suvorova, Bruna Marlia a.k.a. Manola Ruiz, Il Divo, French Latino, Faramarz Aslani, Lola Novaković, Tony Glausi, Richard Galliano, Stjepan Hauser and Manuel Malou.

The song was performed several times on China Central Television by the singer Daniela Anahí Bessia under the musical production of Andy Santana Bass in Spanish and Chinese called 我的心里只有你没有他.

It was featured in the Colombian telenovela La Hija del Mariachi, lip-synched by the actress Carolina Ramirez, and performed by the singers Adriana Bottina and Patricia del Valle. In the film "Visage" by Tsai Ming-liang, Lebanese singer Mohammed Jamal recorded the song in the 1980s in Arabic under the title "You and Dancing and Me" (إنت والرقص وأنا). A Turkish cover called "Bütün Dualarım Seninle' ("All My Prayers with You") was performed by Berkant in 1972.

It has also been covered in Chinese, with the lyrics written by Chen Die-Yi 陳蝶衣. The song title in Chinese is 我的心裡没有他 (literally: He Is Not in My Heart).

In the Philippines, it was recorded by Victor Wood as "Hikalimtan Mo Na Ba" with Visayan lyrics. There was also another song entitled "Pasumpa-sumpa", written and performed by Filipino singer, composer and record producer Bert Dominic. It was later adapted into a novelty version of the song released by local singer Emil Loseñada (also known as Milyo Naryo), titled "Pasumpa Sumpa Ka Pa". The song pokes fun at promises which were not meant to happen.

It has also been covered in Romanian by Florin Salam in 2014 with the title "Fericire, fericire, azi te-am găsit" (literally: Oh, happiness, I have found you). Florin Salam used Luis Miguel's version from Segundo Romance for his cover of "Historia de un Amor".

Il Divo, along with Colombian producer Julio Reyes Copello, recorded the song for the album Amor & Pasión from Il Divo (2015).

A version of this song is played on the Native American flute by Tim Romero (Gabrieleno/Pueblo).

The Pakistani version of this song "Woh Jo Sapno Jaisa Hai" was sung by The Benjamin Sisters (a trio of Pakistani sisters) in collaboration with pop star Alamgir (popularly known as Pakistan's Elvis Presley).

The Khmer (Cambodian) version of this song, titled "រឿងស្នេហ៍នៃយើង", was sung by Sinn Sisamouth and released on the Monorom 7009 vinyl record (Side A).

== See also ==
- Bolero
