= Diotima =

Diotima may refer to:

== People ==
- Diotima of Mantinea, an ancient female philosopher and tutor of Socrates
- Pen-name of Esme Wynn-Tyson, British author.
- Pseudonym of Susette Borkenstein Gontard in poetry by Friedrich Hölderlin
- Pseudonym of Ermelinda Tuzzi, a protagonist in Robert Musil's novel The Man Without Qualities

== Other ==
- 423 Diotima, an asteroid
- Diotima (album), a 2011 album by experimental black metal band Krallice
- Diotima (magazine), a Greek cultural and social magazine
- Diotíma (website), a website on women and gender in the ancient world
- Diotima (typeface), a typeface designed in 1954 by Gudrun Zapf von Hesse
