= Nikos Dimou =

Greek writer and columnist

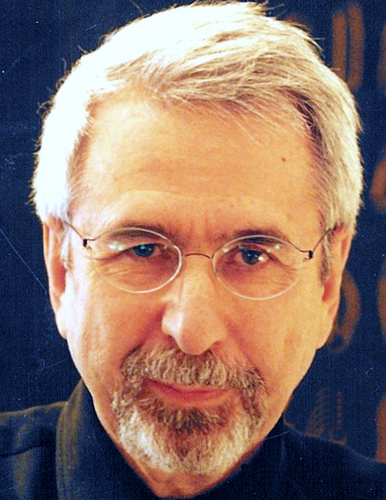
- Born: 1935 (age 90–91); Athens, Greece
- Education: Ludwig-Maximilians-Universität München
- Occupation: Writer

Nikos Dimou (Greek: Νίκος Δήμου; born 1935 in Athens, Greece) is a Greek writer, columnist and copywriter.

== Biography ==
He graduated from Athens College and studied French literature in Athens. From 1954 to 1960, he studied philosophy at the Ludwig-Maximilians-Universität München in Germany. He published his first book in 1953.

In 1962, he started working in advertising as a copywriter. In 1965, he founded his own company. Other than trading commercials, the company created goodwill ads and public initiatives (e.g. I don't forget for Cyprus). In 1983, he withdrew from all business ventures in order to work full-time as a writer. In 1979, Dimou started writing columns for magazines, including Epikaira (Current Issues), 4 Trochoi (4 Wheels), Tetarto (Quarter) and Photographos (Photographer) and newspapers including To Vima, Kathimerini, and the Sunday editions of Eleftherotypia and Ethnos.

Dimou hosted his first talk show on Greek television in 1979, Μία Ταινία – Μία Συζήτηση (A Movie – A Discussion), and returned in 1987 with a show called Διάλογοι (Dialogues). He also ran Περιπέτειες Ιδεών (Adventures of Ideas) in 1991, and Μεγάλες Παρεξηγήσεις (Big Misunderstandings) in 1999. As for radio, he was part of the team that founded Athens 98.4 FM. Later, he had a show on the Third Programme of the ERA state radio. He has won two journalism awards (Abdi İpekçi Award and Botsis Award). In 1997, he became an honorary citizen of Ermoupoli, his mother's hometown. Dimou was awarded the Dimitris Mitropoulos award in 2000.

Dimou has published over 60 books, mostly light non-fiction, including On the Unhappiness of being Greek (Η δυστυχία του να είσαι Έλληνας), The New Greeks (Οι Νέοι Έλληνες), The Lost Social Class (Η Χαμένη Τάξη), Apology of an Anti-Hellene (Απολογία ενός Ανθέλληνα). He has done some hobby photographic work, published two photo albums and has had three photo exhibitions. For seven years he was a columnist in the Greek free press magazine LIFO and lately published in the site "Protagon.gr".

His book "On the Unhappiness of being Greek" has been reprinted 40 times and has been translated into at least 10 languages. Poems of his have been translated in Italian (Book of Cats as "La Gatta di Corfu"), Portuguese and Spanish. 2014 he also published a new book in Germany "The Germans are to blame for everything". ("Die Deutschen sind an allem Schuld").

In politics, he failed to get elected in the European Parliament election in 2009 for the Greek party Drasi.

In March 2014 he became a member of the new Greek party "The River" ("Το Ποτάμι" To Potámi). He resigned one month later because of a difference of opinions on state-church relations.

== Books ==
- Par' ola Afta (Παρ' όλα αυτά, Nevertheless),
- Mikra Vimata (Μικρά Βήματα, Short Steps),
- Imerologio tou Kafsona (Ημερολόγιο του καύσωνα, Diary of the Heat Wave)
- Tolmires Istories (Τολμηρές Ιστορίες, Bold Stories).

Popular philosophy:

- To Apolyto kai to Tavli (Το απόλυτο και το τάβλι, Backgammon and the Absolute)
- Triptyque: Communication, Love, Freedom (Τρίπτυχο: επικοινωνία, αγάπη, ελευθερία, Triptycho: Epikoinonia, Agapi, Eleftheria).

Poetic books:

- To Vivlio ton Gaton (Το βιβλίο των γάτων, The Book of Cats),
- Poiimata 1950–1990 (Ποιήματα 1950–1990, Poems 1950–1990)
- Listes (Λίστες, Lists).

His works also include light essays and aphorisms:

- I Dystihia tou na Eisai Ellinas (Η δυστυχία του να είσαι Έλληνας, The Unhappiness of being Greek)
- Apologia enos Anthellina (Απολογία ενός Ανθέλληνα = Apology of an Anti-Greek)
- Prosengiseis (Προσεγγίσεις, Approaches)
- Dokimia I: Odysseas Elytis (Δοκίμια Ι: Οδυσσέας Ελύτης = Essays I: Odysseus Elytis)
- Dokimia II: Ta Prosopa tis Poiesis (Δοκίμια ΙΙ: Τα πρόσωπα της Ποίησης, Essays II: The Faces of Poetry)
- I Teleia Diadromi (Η τέλεια διαδρομή, The Perfect Drive / Route)
- Psifiaki Zoi (Ψηφιακή Ζωή, Digital Life)

Autobiographies:

- Apo tin Michail Voda stin Syrou (Από την Μιχαήλ Βόδα στην Σύρου, From Michail Voda [Street] to Syros [Street])
- Apo tin Odo Rinou stin Hess Strasse (Από την οδό Ρήνου στην Ες Στράσε, From Rhine Street to Hess Strasse)
- Odos Galinis (Οδός Γαλήνης, Calm Street)
- Oi dromoi mou (Οι δρόμοι μου, My streets)

Nikos Dimou translated poems from English, German and Latin and also translated The Voices of Marrakesh by Elias Canetti.
