= Gad Barzilai =

Israeli professor of law (1958–2023)

- גד ברזילי
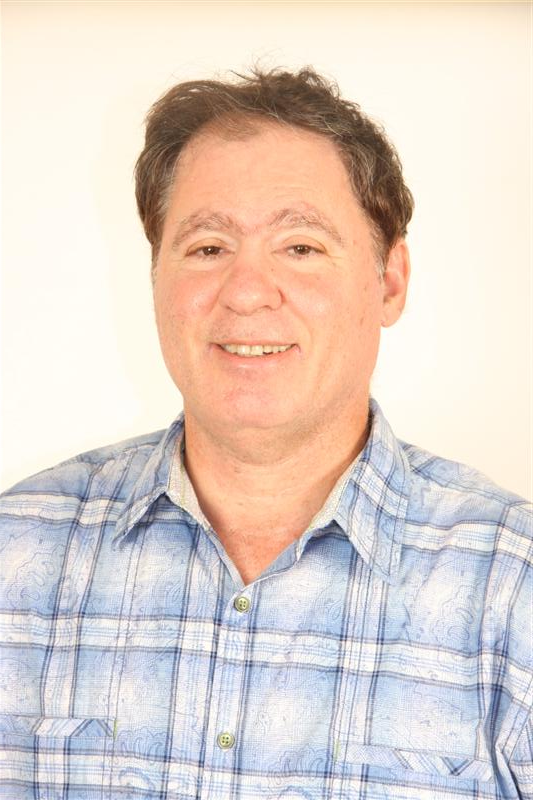
- Barzilai in 2012
- Born: January 11, 1958; Tel Aviv, Israel
- Died: April 10, 2023 (aged 65)
- Occupations: Professor of Law; Vice Provost Emeritus; Dean Emeritus

Academic background
- Education: Bar Ilan University (BA, MA); Tel Aviv University (LLB); Hebrew University of Jerusalem (Ph.D); Yale University (Postdoc); Michigan University

Academic work
- Discipline: Political Science
- Sub-discipline: Law
- Institutions: University of Haifa; University of Washington

Gad Barzilai (Hebrew: גד ברזילי; 11 January 1958 – 10 April 2023) was an Israeli professor of law, political science and international studies, famous for his work on the politics of law, comparative law and politics, human rights, and communities. Barzilai published 18 books and 173 articles in major academic refereed journals and publishing houses. He had been a full professor of law, societies and justice, and international studies at the University of Washington and the University of Haifa Faculty of Law. Gad Barzilai had served as the dean of the Faculty of Law at University of Haifa (2012–2017) and was the vice provost of University of Haifa from 2016 until 2019.

Barzilai was a professor of political science and law at Tel Aviv University where he co-founded and served (1996–2004) as co-director of the Law, Society and Politics Graduate Program.

== Biography ==
Barzilai was born on 11 January 1958 in Tel Aviv to parents who had survived the Holocaust. He studied History, Judaism, and Political Science at Bar-Ilan University, Law at Tel Aviv University, and in 1987 he received his PhD from the Hebrew University in Jerusalem, which awarded him several prestigious prizes as well as a Fulbright grant. After completing his PhD and LLB [JD] he studied quantitative research methods at University of Michigan, Ann Arbor, and completed a post doctorate at Yale University. Later, he continued to teach at Yale University before deciding to return to Israel.

Barzilai served as a professor at Tel Aviv University in the political science department and the law school. Barzilai was the first founding director (1999–2002) of the newly-established international Dan David Prize, which is among the three large-prize foundations in the world, bestowing international prizes and scholarships for academic and scientific international excellence. In 2004, he moved to the University of Washington where he had been a professor in the Law, Societies, and Justice Program, Comparative Law and Society Studies Center, and in the Jackson School of International Studies. In 2012 he was elected and served as the dean of the Faculty of Law at University of Haifa.

Barzilai was the co-founder and co-chair of the Israeli Association of Law and Society. He was a board member of the Law and Society Association (class of 2006), American Journal of Political Science (1998–2003), Association of Israel Studies (1993–1996, 2007–2023), Israel Studies Forum (2004–2023), and the Journal of Comparative Studies (2006–2023). He was active in international, Israeli and Israeli-Palestinian human rights organizations and has advised senior politicians and NGOs on issues of law and politics. Barzilai was elected in 2011 as the president of the Association for Israel Studies and served until 2013.

Gad Barzilai is best known for his critical analysis of law as a dimension in political power, which should be understood through using combined methodologies of socio-political-legal studies. His work emphasizes the importance of legal pluralism, political elite, critical communitarianism, cultural relativism, and political power in local, state and global sites. Barzilai had published numerous books and articles on these issues.

Barzilai died on 10 April 2023, at age 65.

== Selected Books ==
- Gad Barzilai, 1996, Wars, Internal Conflicts and Political Order: A Jewish Democracy in the Middle East, Albany: State University of New York Press
- Gad Barzilai and David Nachmias, 1998, Governmental Lawyering in the Political Sphere: Advocating the Leviathan, Israel Studies 3 (2): 30-46
- Gad Barzilai, 2003, Communities and Law: Politics and Cultures of Legal Identities, Ann Arbor: University of Michigan Press
- Gad Barzilai, 2007 Law and Religion, Aldershot: Ashgate Publishing LtD.
- Gad Barzilai, 2008 Beyond Relativism: Where is Political Power in Legal Pluralism, Theoretical Inquiries in Law 9 (2)
- Gad Barzilai, 2010 The Attorney General and the State Prosecutor: Is Institutional Separation Warranted?, Jerusalem: The Israel Democracy Institute

== Selected Articles ==
- Law is Politics
- The Case of Azmi Bishara: Political Immunity and Freedom in Israel
- Fantasies of Liberalism and Liberal Jurisprudence: State Law, Politics, and the Israeli-Arab-Palestinian Community
- Courts as Hegemonic Institutions: The Israeli Supreme Court in a Comparative Perspective
- War, Democracy, and Internal Conflict: Israel in a Comparative Perspective
- Israel and Future Borders: A Multidimensional Approach to the Assessment of a Dynamic Process
- Social Protest and the Absence of Legalistic Discourse: In the Quest for New Language of Protest
- The Ambivalence of Litigation: A Criticism of Power
- Cultured Technology: Internet and Religious Fundamentalism
- Culture of Patriarchy in Law: Violence from Antiquity to Modernity
- The Redemptive Principle of Particularistic Obligations: A Legal Political Inquiry
- National Security in Courts and Law: A Theoretical and Comparative Analysis
