= Manolis Pratikakis =

Greek poet (born 1943)

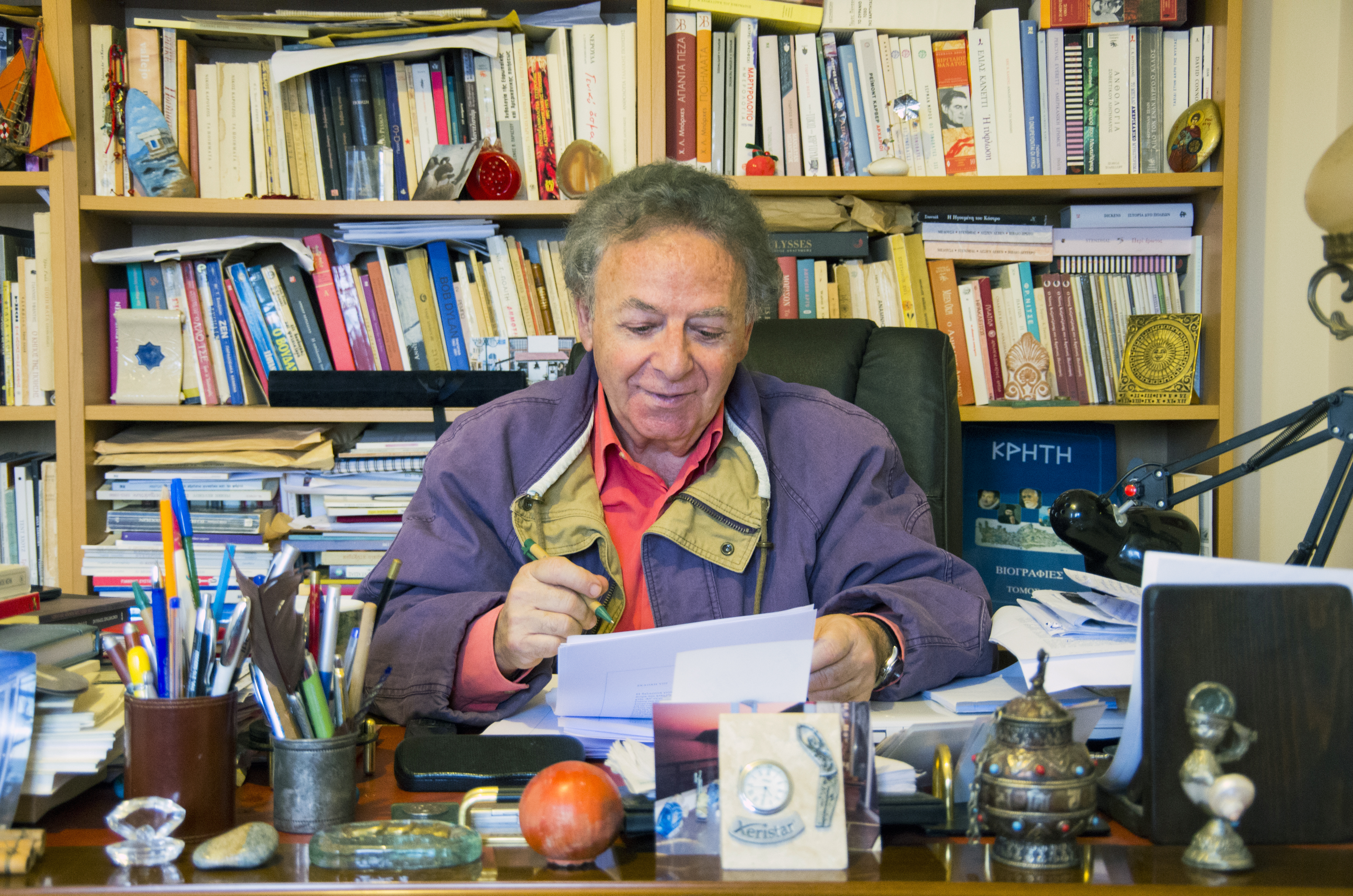
- Manolis Pratikakis
- Born: 1943 (age 82–83); Myrtos, Ierapetra, Greece
- Occupation: poet
- Writing career
- Period: 1974–present

Manolis Pratikakis (Greek: Μανόλης Πρατικάκης; born 1943) is a Greek poet. He read Medicine at the University of Athens and he is a practicing neurologist and psychiatrist. His first collection of poems was published in 1974; he belongs to the so-called Genia tou 70, which is a literary term referring to Greek authors who began publishing their work during the 1970s, especially towards the end of the Greek military junta of 1967-1974 and at the first years of the Metapolitefsi. For his collection of poems Το νερό, in 2003, he received the Greek National Book Award.

== Selected poetry ==
- Ποίηση 1971-1974 (Poetry 1971–1974), 1974
- Οι παραχαράκτες (The Counterfeiters), 1976
- Λιβιδώ (Libido), 1978
- Η παραλοϊσμένη (The Demented), 1980
- Γενεαλογία (Genealogy), 1984
- Το νερό (The Water), 2002
- Ποιήματα 1984-2000 (Poems 1984–2000), 2003
