= Antonis Fostieris =

Greek poet (born 1953)

Andonis Fostieris
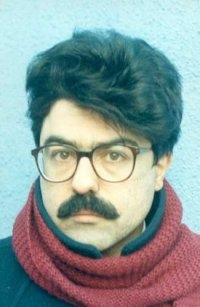
- Born: 1953 (age 72–73); Athens, Greece
- Occupation: poet
- Writing career
- Period: 1971–present

Andonis Fostieris (Greek: Αντώνης Φωστιέρης; born 1953) is a Greek poet. He studied Law at the University of Athens and History of Law at Sorbonne, Paris. Since 1981, he is co-editor and director of the literary periodical Η λέξη.

Fostieris is one of the eminent poets of the so-called Generation of the Seventies Genia tou 70, which is a literary term referring to Greek authors who began publishing their work during the 1970s, especially towards the end of the Greek military junta of 1967–1974 and at the first years of the Metapolitefsi. Fostieris has been widely translated; that includes translation into English by Kimon Friar (1984), the acclaimed translator and scholar for his Modern Greek literature translations. A dual language (Greek-English) Anthology of his poetry under the title Ars Poetica – Poetry within Poetry and Other Poems has recently been published by Colenso Books in London (June 2023).

== His poetry ==
Fostieris' poetic quest is realised in a language marked for its clarity and intimacy. Through a dense poetic language, refined to the degree of perfection, Fostieris seeks to outline a view of life: “The problem of poetic expression has been shifted from the agonising quest for the avant-garde and the old axiom ‘it does not matter what you say, but how you say it’. Without ignoring the manner, the essence, the view of life that the work represents counts more and more.” Fostieris builds his structures within each poem and across the collection as a whole. His poetry is multilayered and rich in intertextual references, like in the following excerpt from 'Poetry is Not Made of Ideas':

In any case / Mallarmé excluded it: / Poetry is not made of ideas. / (Good idea. Can it become a poem? Difficult). / Consequently / You are left with the feeling. / You are left with the feeling / Of affliction / Of the eternal triumph / Of feelings.

== Selected poetry ==
- Το Μεγάλο Ταξίδι (The Big Trip), 1971
- Εσωτερικοί Χώροι ή Τα Είκοσι (Interiors or The Twenty), 1973
- Ποίηση μέσα στην ποίηση (Poetry within poetry), 1977
- Σκοτεινός έρωτας (Dark Eros), 1977
- Ο διάβολος τραγούδησε σωστά (The Devil Sang in Tune), 1981
- Το θα και το να του θανάτου (The D and the A of Death), 1987
- Η σκέψη ανήκει στο πένθος (Thought Belongs to Mourning), 1996
- Πολύτιμη Λήθη (Precious Oblivion), 2003
- Ποίηση 1970–2005 (Poetry 1970–2005), 2008
- Τοπία του Τίποτα (Landscapes of Nothing), 2013

== Translations of his work ==
- Dark Eros – The Devil Sang in Tune, transl. Kimon Friar, California: Realities Library, 1984, 1986.
- Mørk Eros, transl.. W. G. Pedersen, Arhus: Husets Forlag, Denmark, 1998.
- Djævelen Sang Rent, transl.. W. G. Pedersen, Arhus: Husets Forlag, Denmark, 1998.
- La Pensée Appartient au Deuil, transl.. M. Volkovitch, Paris: Desmos/Cahiers grecs, 1998.
- La Reflexion Pertenece al Luto, transl.. N. Anghelidis – C. Spinedi, Buenos Aires: Edit. Metáfora, 1998.
- Nostalgia del Presente, transl. N. Crocetti, Milano: Crocetti Editore, 2000, 2001.
- Segnali Morse, transl.. M. De Rosa, Milano: En Plein Officina, 2002.
- Prezioso Oblio, transl.. N. Crocetti, Milano: Poesia/195, 2005.
- Mиcao Припада Жалости, transl.. M. Radic, Serbia: Gradinarnik/NKC. Nis, 2008.
- Kамење Драгоценогзаборава, transl.. M. Radic, Serbia: Gradinarnik/NKC. Nis, 2008.
- Precious Oblivion, transl.. T. Nairn – D. Zervanou, Edinburgh: Dionysia Press, 2008.
- Oubli Précieux, transl. C. Mavroeidakos-Muller, Paris: Desmos/Poésie, 2008.
- Sehnsucht nach Gegenwart, transl. Hans and Niki Eideneier, Köln: Romiosini/Poesie griechisch-deutsch, 2013.
- Dichtung in der Dichtung, transl. Hans and Niki Eideneier, Köln: Romiosini/Poesie griechisch-deutsch, 2013.
- Poesia nella Poesia, transl. Nicola Crocetti, Milano: Crocetti Editore, 2013.
- Paesaggi del Nulla, transl. Nicola Crocetti, Milano: Poesia/292, 2014.
- Në sallonin tuaj fëshfërin pylli, transl. Niko Kacalidha, Tirana: Neraida, 2014.
- Ars Poetica: Poetry within Poetry and Other Poems, transl. Irene Loulakaki-Moore, ed. Anthony Hirst, London: Colenso Books, 2023.
