= Yiannis Patilis =

Greek poet (born 1947)

Yiannis Patilis (Greek: Γιάννης Πατίλης) (born 21 February 1947 in Colonus, Athens) is a Greek poet.

== Biography ==
He spent his childhood in Colonus and later in Patisia. He has been living in Nea Smyrni since 2005. He studied law and modern Greek philology at the University of Athens and worked as a professor of philology in secondary education from 1980 to 2010.

He was the co-founder of the literary journals To Dentro (1978), Nisos – Music and Poetry (1983) and Critique and Texts (1984). Since 1986 he has published the literary journal Planodion, while in April 2010 he created and has since run a website for short stories called Bonsai Stories.

In 1995 he edited, with the collaboration of Elissavet Liaropoulou, the philological edition in two volumes of Angelos Simiriotis' poems (1870–1944). Simirioti was a poet from Smyrna in Asia Minor.

In 1996, he was a guest at the Hellenic Studies Program of the University of Princeton and in 2000 a guest poet at the 31st International Poetry Festival in Rotterdam, the Netherlands. His poems have been translated into many languages and have been included in many anthologies and magazines in Greece and abroad. In 1997, the literary magazine Emvolimon prepared and circulated a special issue dedicated to his poetry.

== Poetry ==
He belongs to the so-called Genia tou 70 (‘Generation of the ‘70s), which is a literary term referring to Greek authors who began publishing their work during the 1970s, especially towards the end of the Greek military junta of 1967-1974 and in the first years of the Metapolitefsi. According to the Dutch Hellenist and translator of his poems into Dutch, Hero Hokwerda, "the poets of this generation fiercely oppose the rise of the modern technological, capitalistic consumer society, which they see as a mortal threat to the individual. Patilis, despite his sarcasm, is often more humorous and ironic in tone than his contemporaries. His poetry is truly a poetry of the city, of the daily microcosm of urban life, reflecting the changing times. If he still uses names from ancient Greek history and mythology, it is not in pursuit of nationalistic goals or in search of a Greek national identity; his poetry remains strictly personal and is about the place of the individual in modern society."

=== Poetry collections ===
- Ο μικρός και το θηρίο (The Little Guy and the Beast), 1970
- Αλλά τώρα, προσέχτε! (But Now Be Careful!), 1973
- Υπερ των καρπών (In Favor of Fruition), 1977
- Κέρματα (Tokens), 1980
- Μη καπνιστής σε χώρα καπνιζόντων (Poems 1970–1980) (Non-Smoker in the Land of Smokers; poems, 1970–80), 1982
- Ζεστό μεσημέρι (Warm Midday), 1984
- Γραφέως κάτοπτρον (The Scribe's Mirror), 1989
- Ταξίδια στην ίδια πόλη (Poems 1970–1990) (Trips in the Same City, poems, 1970–90), 1993
- Ακτή Καλλιμασιώτη (Kallimasioti Coast), 2009
- Αποδρομή του Αλκοόλ και άλλα ποιήματα (Alcohol in Remission and other poems), 2012

A selection of his poetry is available in English: Camel of Darkness. Selected Poems (1970–1990)', translated from the Greek by Stathis Gourgouris, Quarterly Review of Literature, Poetry Books Series, Volume XXXVI, Princeton 1997.
