= Sotiris Trivizas =

Greek poet, essayist and translator (born 1960)

- Born: 1960 (age 65–66); Corfu, Greece
- Occupations: poet, essayist, translator
- Writing career
- Period: 1982–

Sotiris Trivizas (Greek: Σωτήρης Τριβιζάς) (b. Corfu 1960) is a Greek poet, essayist and translator. He read Philology and journalism in Thessaloniki. He is a member of the Porfiras literary magazine editorial board.

== Works ==
=== Poetry ===
- Το κέλυφος (The Shell), 1982
- Κίβδηλο φεγγάρι (False Moon), 1984
- Βίος Ασωμάτων και άλλα ποιήματα (Life of the bodiless and other poems), 1991

=== Essays ===
- Το σουρρεαλιστικό σκάνδαλο. Χρονικό της υποδοχής του υπερρεαλιστικού κινήματος στην Ελλάδα (The Surrealist Scandal. Chronicle of the reception of the surrealist movement in Greece), 1996
- Το πνεύμα του λόγου (The spirit of reason), 2000

=== Selected translations ===
- Pirandello, Luigi, Χάος (Chaos) 1996
- Pavese, Cesare, O θάνατος θα 'ρθει και θα 'χει τα μάτια σου (Verrà la morte ed avrà i tuoi occhi), 1997
- Ungaretti, Giuseppe, Σπουδή θανάτου, 1998

=== Anthologies ===
- Ποιητές του Μεσοπολέμου (Interwar Poets), 1997
- Nαπολέων Λαπαθιώτης. Μια παρουσίαση (Napoleon Lapathiotis: a presentation), 2000
