= Nikos Gounaris =

Greek singer

Nikos Gounaris

Nikos Gounaris (Greek: Νίκος Γούναρης; 1915 – 5 May 1965) was a Greek tenor who was enormously popular as a light music singer in the 1950s.

== Biography ==
Gounaris was born in 1915 in Zagora. He began playing the mandolin at the age of four. He attended the Athens Conservatoire.

Gounaris was a Greek elafró/light music singer and among the foremost Greek composers and musicians of the 1950s and 1960s. He was especially popular in the Greek community in America. A great deal of his entertainment was at two Greek resorts in the Catskills in upstate NY, the Sunset and the Monte Carlo. He mainly sang about the sad side of love and betrayed lovers.

Hit songs included "Ena vradi pou 'vrehe," "Glikia mou matia agapimena," and "Omorfi Athina".

He composed about 400 songs and played with the Trio Bel Canto during the 1960s.

He died in 1965 in Athens of cancer.

== Famous songs ==
- Αγάπη μου όμορφη - My beautiful love
- Από τότε, την Άνοιξη - Since then, in Springtime
- Αυτός ο άλλος - That other man
- Γλυκά μου μάτια αγαπημένα - My sweet, beloved eyes
- Είναι αργά πια τώρα να χωρίσουμε - It's too late for us to split up
- Εκεί ψηλά στον Άη-Λια - On top of St Elias' hill
- Ένα βράδυ που 'βρεχε - On a rainy night
- Θυμήσου - Remember!
- Κάϊρο - Cairo
- Ο Βεδουίνος - The Bedouin
- Ο κόσμος άλλαξε αλλάξαν οι καιροί - People changed, times changed
- Όμορφη μου Αθήνα - Beautiful Athens
- Που 'ν' αυτά τα μάτια; - Where are those eyes?
- Σκαλί θα κατεβώ - I'll descend the steps
- Σε είδα να κλαδεύεις - I saw you trimming the tree
- Πέντε χρόνια περάσανε - Five years have passed
- Τώρα που σε γνώρισα - Now that I met you

== Discography ==
- Ihografisis Stis Ipa 1958–1960
- Asteria Tou Ellinikou Tragoudiou - Gounaris
- Axehasti Epohi - Nikos Gounaris
- Ta Petalakia
- Ta Oreotera Mou Tragoudia No2
- Ta Oreotera Mou Tragoudia
- I Ellada Tou Gounari
- Back cover of LP - "Nikos Gounaris and the Trio Belcanto" (Hampshire records)

== Sources ==
- Biography - Nikos Gounaris (Greek)
- Trio Bel Canto - History
- Nikos Gounaris biography on Wiki Phantis
