= I lexi =

I lexi (Greek: Η λέξη) is a Greek literary periodical published by Antonis Fostieris and Thanassis Niarchos in Athens since 1981.
