= Hrysoula Stefanaki =

Greek singer and musician

- Born: 11 September 1974 (age 51)
- Origin: Heraklion, Crete, Greece
- Genres: Greek folk music; International Retro/Jazz songs
- Occupations: Musician, singer
- Instruments: Vocals; piano; guitar
- Years active: 1996–present

Hrysoula Stefanaki (Χρυσούλα Στεφανάκη) is a Greek singer and musician, born in Heraklion, Crete, Greece, best known for her performances with David Nachmias on Greek retro (interwar era) songs such as "Tango Notturno", "Blue Haven", "The Last Waltz" etc.

== Early years ==
Stefanaki started playing piano very early in her childhood at the age of five. Her parents cultivated her natural musical talent by enrolling her for piano lessons at the age of six, along with guitar, theory and harmony at the "Apollo Conservatory of Music" at Heraklion, Crete. This journey lasted 12 years. Later, she continued her music education with voice lessons at the "Olympic Athens Conservatory".

She started ballet lessons as well at the age of six for five continuous years.

The dream to become an actress pushed her to participate in several school plays throughout her school years.

She learned traditional Cretan dances in the dance school of Lazarus Hnaris. Her love for Cretan music, drove her to follow her father (a Cretan folk dancer), to traditional festivals of Crete, where she refined her dancing competence.

While in high school, Stefanaki participated in "Korae" choir as well as in the choir of St. Menas church under the direction of Mrs Xylouris.

During a festival at her senior year of high school, where she played guitar and sang, she were offered to sing professionally at a known piano restaurant at Heraklion. This milestone signaled her professional journey as a singer.

== Collaborations ==
In 1996, Manolis Lidakis proposed a collaboration and they worked together during summer concerts. That first summer was followed by several collaborations with Greek singers such as:

- 1997, with George Hatzinasios and Stefanos Korkolis.
- 1999 to 2002, with Vicky Moscholiou.
- 2001, with Yannis Spanos.
- 2004, with Mimis Plessas and Dimitris Mitropanos.
- 2005, with Costas Macedonas, Dimitris Basis and Glykeria.
- 2007, with Christos Nikolopoulos.
- 2008, with Manolis Mitsias.

Stefanaki participated in numerous concerts in Greece and abroad with most of the artists mentioned above. Since 2005, Stefanaki has performed with pianist David Nachmias on a show entitled From Attik to Gounares, featuring Greek retro/Jazz songs written between 1910 and 1950.

== Discography ==
- 1997: Participation in the CD titled Damned 70's (Καταραμένο’70) with remakes of old folk songs produced by Mirror.
- 2002: Vocalist on the soundtrack entitled As long as there is love (Όσο υπάρχει αγάπη) with music by Marios Strofalis, produced by Heaven.
- 2010: For a woman (Για μια Γυναίκα), a personal collection of mid-war era Greek songs arranged by David Nachmias.
- 2010–2011: Worked with Dimitris Basis and Yannis Kotsiras, in Thessaloniki and Athens
