= Athens Voice =

Greek media company

- Current logo
- Type: Newspaper
- Format: Alternative weekly
- Publisher: Fotis Georgeles
- Editor-in-chief: Aggeliki Birbili
- Founded: 2003
- Headquarters: Charilaou Trikoupi 22, Athens, Greece
- Circulation: app. 150,000 (readership) per week
- Website: www.athensvoice.gr

Athens Voice is a Greek media company that includes the printed Athens Voice paper, the website (athensvoice.gr) of Athens Voice paper/magazine, the radio station Athens Voice Radio 102.5 and Athens Voice Books publishing house.

== Overview ==
Established in 2003, the Athens Voice paper is a free press weekly edition released every Thursday with a distribution network that includes Athens, Thessaloniki, and 20 more cities in Greece. The cover page of the newspaper consists of submissions from local and international artists. This has led to the establishment of one of the major art events in the city, "Art on the Front Page," with an exhibition of the original artworks at the Benaki Museum in Athens.

Athens Voice and athensvoice.gr contain original material, articles, and comments on current socio-political affairs and stories on arts, books, fashion, urban culture, travel, events, nightlife, and culinary trends. The online version, with over 2.5 million unique visitors monthly, combines the articles published in the print version with new material.

Athens Voice Radio 102.5 FM began broadcasting in November 2017.

In 2019 the Athens Voice courted controversy with a joke about a nurse from Armenia, who ended her life to avoid deportation. The newspaper's offices were subject to attacks, which were determined to be from anarchist group Rouvikonas.

The Athens Voice has expanded through extra editions (Look Mag for women, Men Voice for men, Home Voice for home and design, the Thessaloniki-based monthly magazine Soul for young lifestyle, the Summer and Winter Guides), the organizing of cultural events (the cover exhibition at the Benakis Museum, First Sound live music) and its participation in others (Fashion Week, European Music Day).

Its annual travel guides (City & Islands Summer Guide) are published in English. The English online version of combine the articles published in the print version with additional travel material.

Aside from the typical rotating cast of journalists, the Athens Voice has featured columns by the likes of prime minister Kyriakos Mitsotakis, and Orchestral Manoeuvres in the Dark singer Andy McCluskey.

== See also ==
- List of magazines in Greece
