= Sotria Kritsonis =

American advocator (born 1949)

- Born: Sotria Linda Kritsonis; April 29, 1949 (age 77); Bellevue, Washington, U. S.
- Other name: Linda Kritsonis
- Education: Franklin High School
- Occupations: Advocator; Human rights activist
- Years active: 2018 – present
- Children: 2

Sotria Linda Kritsonis (born April 29, 1949) is an American public advocate for trauma survivors. She is best known as a high-profile survivor of the American serial killer Ted Bundy. Kritsonis remained private about her 1972 encounter for forty-six years before coming forward in 2018 to challenge media portrayals that romanticize serial predators.

== Early life and education ==
Kritsonis was born in Bellevue, Washington, and raised in the Seattle area. She attended Franklin High School, where she was a member of the Class of 1967.

== 1972 encounter with Ted Bundy ==
In early 1972, at the age of 22, Kritsonis was a college student living in Seattle. On a cold, snowy morning, she was waiting for a city bus at the intersection of Rainier Avenue South and South Orcas Street. After waiting for over an hour, she was approached by a man driving a tan/pale yellow Volkswagen Beetle.

=== The abduction ===
The driver, whom she later identified as Ted Bundy, offered her a ride, stating that he had seen no buses coming for miles. Kritsonis accepted the ride to escape the cold. Shortly after entering the vehicle, she realized the driver was heading south on I-5 toward Tukwila, the opposite direction of her school in Renton.

Kritsonis reported that the driver's demeanor shifted from "charming" to aggressive. When she attempted to exit the moving vehicle, she discovered the interior passenger door handle had been removed. She recalled the driver reaching under his seat for a heavy metallic object—consistent with the tire iron Bundy used in later attacks—while yelling, "You're never going to make it to school".

=== The "Lucky" escape ===
During the ordeal, the driver ordered Kritsonis to remove her wool hat. A week prior, Kritsonis had cut her long, dark brown hair into a shoulder-length bob. Upon seeing her hair, the driver reportedly appeared shocked and asked, "Why did you cut your hair?".

Criminal profilers and Kritsonis herself suggest that because she no longer matched Bundy's specific "ideal" victim profile (traditionally women with long hair parted in the middle), his predatory ritual was disrupted. After driving aimlessly for approximately an hour, the man dropped her off in front of her college, pushed her to the ground, and told her she was "lucky".

=== Identification and later life ===
Kritsonis did not report the incident to the police at the time, citing feelings of embarrassment and the fact that she had not been physically harmed. She identified her abductor eighteen months later while watching a television news report following Bundy's arrest in Utah.

== Personal life ==
Kritsonis is married and has two children. She remains private regarding her family's specific details and she lives in the Seattle area. She is also known as Linda Kritsonis.

== Advocacy ==
In 2018, Kritsonis broke her silence in an exclusive interview with KIRO 7 News reporter Dave Wagner. Her primary motivation for speaking out was to de-romanticize Bundy as she expressed disgust with media portrayals that characterize Bundy as "brilliant" or "charming," describing him instead as a "monster". She advocates for centering the voices of victims and survivors in true crime narratives rather than the perpetrators. She uses her story to support other survivors in their long-term healing journeys.

== See also ==
- Ted Bundy
