= Ptisi & Diastima =

Monthly magazine published in Greece

- Jan 2008 cover
- Categories: Aerospace and defense
- Frequency: Monthly
- Circulation: 44,000
- Founded: 1979
- Company: Technikes Ekdoseis Publishing House
- Country: Greece
- Language: Greek
- Website: Ptisi & Diastima

Ptisi & Diastima (Greek: Πτήση & Διάστημα, meaning Flight & Space) was a monthly magazine published in Greece. The first issue was published in November 1979, thus making it the oldest aviation and defence magazine in Greece.

It was founded by Costas Cavvathas and published by his company Technical Press until 2006. After 2006, the magazine continued without its founder, since Technical Press was sold to Liberis Publications, which later sold the publication's title to Faithon Karaiossifidis.

The magazine had a monthly readership of 36,000 in 2006, while reaching 44,000 in 2007.

In June 2020, the current publisher of Ptisi & Diastima, Faithon Karaiossifidis, changed the publication's name to Ptisi, making the May 2020 issue, the last of Ptisi & Diastima.
