= Apikoğlu =

Turkish meat packing organization

- Industry: Meat packing
- Founded: 1910; 116 years ago
- Founder: Krikor Apikoğlu
- Headquarters: Istanbul, Turkey
- Number of locations: Tuzla
- Area served: International
- Products: Pastirma and sujuk
- Owner: Kartallıoğlu and Ağca Families
- Website: apikoglu.com.tr

Apikoğlu Brothers is a family owned and operated meat packing organization founded in Turkey. The company is renowned for its production of sujuk and pastirma. Apikoğlu is the first company to mass-produce meat products in Turkey and serve the demand of its entire national market.

== Early years ==
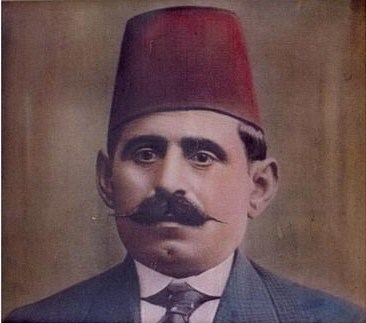
Krikor Apikoğlu, the founder of the Apikoğlu Company (circa 1923)

Apikoğlu was founded in Kayseri in 1910 by ethnic Armenian Krikor Apikoğlu (1878–1945). Apikoğlu moved its base of operations to Istanbul in 1920, opening its production facility in a neighborhood of the Maltepe suburb called İdealtepe. The company's headquarters occupied the lower level of the family's home, limiting their domicile to the upper levels.

== The brothers take charge ==
As business expanded, the company eventually outgrew the Maltepe facility, subsequently moving its manufacturing operations to Alibeyköy. The factory in Alibeyköy was managed by brothers, Agop and Hayk Apikoğlu. This is when the company began doing business as (dba) Apikoğlu Brothers. Apikoğlu Brothers was soon selling its products throughout Turkey.

=== Innovations ===
Efforts to meet the increasing national demand spawned an innovation, Apikoğlu Brothers was able to incorporate from the 1960s. Their patented system made it possible to produce marketable halal meats directly from the slaughterhouse. The technique had the cow dangling upside down so that when the cow was slaughtered, the blood could easily flow out of its body. The technique had never been practiced in the manufacturing of foodstuffs and the precedent quickly became standard practice throughout Turkey, and eventually the entire meat packing industry. In order to supply the increasing needs of national demand, Apikoğlu Brothers increased its workforce to 200 people in 1987. They also purchased a 45,000 square metres (480,000 sq ft) modern facility in Tuzla. As of 2013, Apikoğlu Brothers are continuing their manufacturing operations from the Tuzla facilities, with no indications that Tuzla operations will discontinue at any time in the near future.

== Legacy ==
In the 2009 book: Markaların Öyküsü, (English translation: The History of Brands) Apikoğlu is described as one of "the 304 most famous brands in the world". This designation preceded the Apikoğlu Brothers celebration of 100 continuous years in operation on its 2010 anniversary.

The Apikoğlu Brothers were mentioned in Nobel Prize winning author Orhan Pamuk's book Istanbul: Memories of a City.

== Awards ==
Apikoğlu Brothers received the Altın Marka Award for two consecutive years (2005–06).
