= Porfiras =

Literary periodical published in Corfu

Porfiras (Greek: Πόρφυρας) is a literary periodical published in Corfu since June 1980. The title of the periodical is a dialect word for "shark" taken from a poem of the same title by Dionysios Solomos. It is published on a quarterly basis.
