= LiFO =

Greek magazine

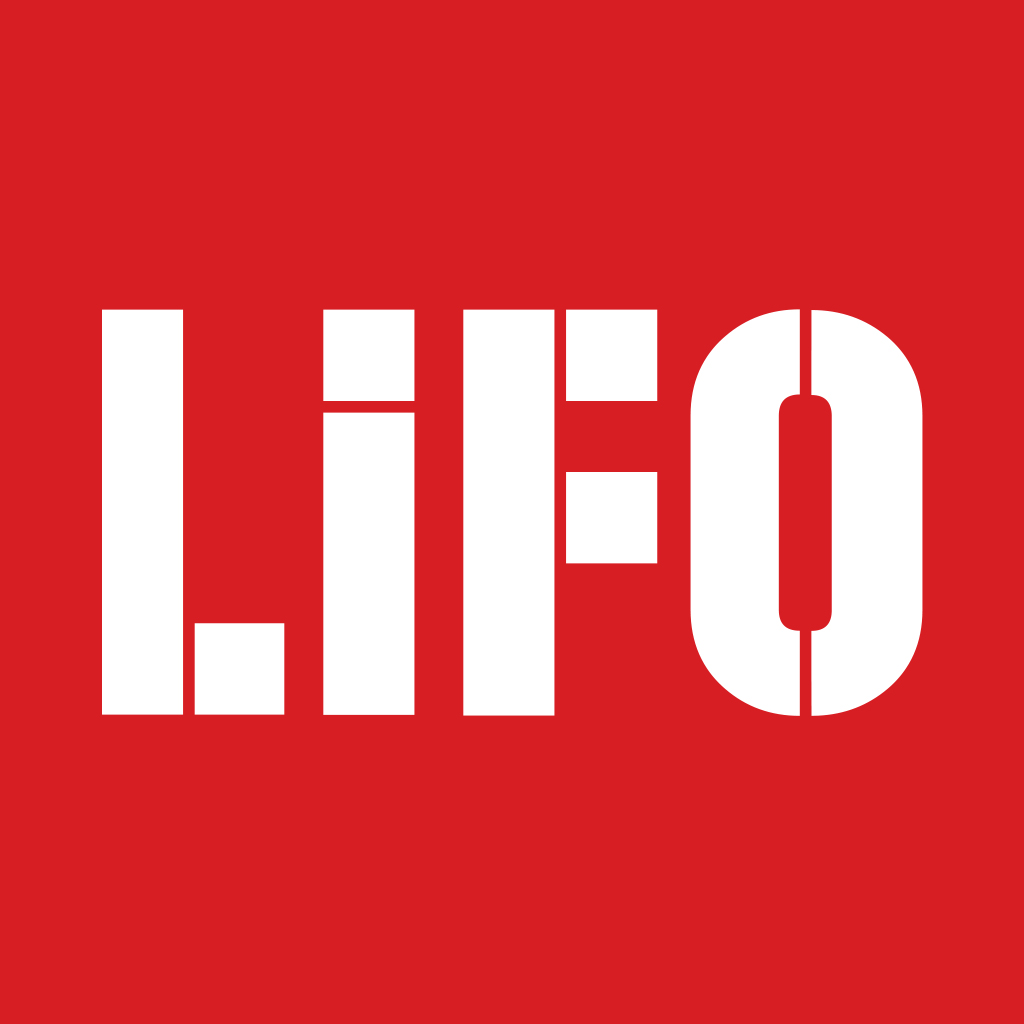
- Current logo
- Editor-in-chief: Michalis Michael
- Categories: Free newspaper (free press)
- Frequency: Alternative weekly
- Publisher: Stathis Tsangarousianos
- Founder: Stathis Tsangarousianos
- Founded: 2005
- Company: DYO DEKA
- Country: Greece
- Based in: Athens
- Language: Greek
- Website: www.lifo.gr

LiFO is a Greek free weekly city guide published by DYO DEKA and distributed in selected spots in Athens and Thessaloniki.

It was created by journalist Stathis Tsangarousianos in 2005, and its first issue was published in December of that year.

The website LiFO (lifo.gr) initially featured the contents of the magazine but has become a portal that includes news, features on current affairs, culture, a city guide, local news, and videos.

== History ==
The first issue was published in Athens and Thessaloniki on December 1, 2005. The word ATHINA was included in the logo for the first few issues.

Being a free city guide, it featured anything of value happening in the Greek capital and included opinions and interviews.

In 2007, the website LiFO.gr was created, and apart from the contents of the print LiFO, it was updated daily with web-only content from its writers. Its original concept included a community of bloggers who could create their own blogs on the platform. In 2010, the site was upgraded, and only selected bloggers could publish their material.

LiFO is known for its alternative approach to cultural happenings, its progressive and tolerant view on social issues, and the presentation of Athenian life. One of its longest-running and most popular columns is "The Athenians", where every week, one well-known person tells the story of their life.

Pluralism and tolerance in diverse opinions are the main characteristics of the site's contents, as well as its anti-racist, anti-clerical and socially progressive stance.

== See also ==
- List of magazines in Greece
- List of newspapers in Greece
