= Photographos =

Greek photography and imaging magazine

- Editors: Takis Tzimas, Panayiotis Kaldis
- Categories: Photography
- Frequency: Monthly
- First issue: December 5, 1989
- Company: Press Photo Publications
- Country: Greece
- Based in: Athens
- Language: Greek
- Website: www.photo.gr
- ISSN: 1105-3941
- OCLC: 723814324

Photographos (Greek: Φωτογράφος, meaning photographer) is a Greek photography and imaging magazine, published monthly by Press Photo Publications and distributed with the Greek newspaper, Kathimerini and autonomously, the penultimate Saturday of each month (October 24 this month).

The magazine provides articles on equipment reviews, photographic and editing techniques, photographic history and profiles of professional photographers.

== About the magazine ==
Photographos is the longest running and most established photo magazine in Greece. Its first issue was published on December 5, 1989. From 1989 to 1994, the magazine was published semimonthly and in October 2003 the cooperation with Kathimerini began. The magazine is a member of the Technical Image Press Association (TIPA), the European Federation of Magazine Publishers (FAEP) and the International Federation of the Periodical Press (FIPP). Panayiotis Kaldis is the editor of this magazine that offers subscription services in Greece as well as other countries.

The activities of the magazine include the edition of books on photography and the organization of seminars for amateur and professional photographers. The Press Photo Publications company organizes every two years (since 1995), PHOTOVISION, the largest trade fair for the photographic and imaging industries in Greece.
