= Diotima (magazine) =

Greek cultural and social magazine

Diotima - first cover

Diotima (Greek: Διοτίμα) is a Greek cultural and social magazine ( ISSN 1790-4552) published in Tripoli of Arcadia, Greece. It is named after the ancient priestess Diotima, coming from Mantineia of Arcadia and mentioned by Plato in his Symposium as being the tutor of the young Socrates in the 'art of love'. It deals with historical, art, scientific and philosophical matters.

Diotima is published by Αρκαδικές Εκδόσεις (Arcadian Editions) and the magazine is edited by Michael Mergupis and Dimitris Georgopoulos. The first issue was Spring 2005 since when four issues have been produced.

The magazine is available to universities and various scientific institutions. It should not be confused with a homonym Greek magazine of previous decades.
