= Sujuk =

Sausage of Balkan to Central Asian origin

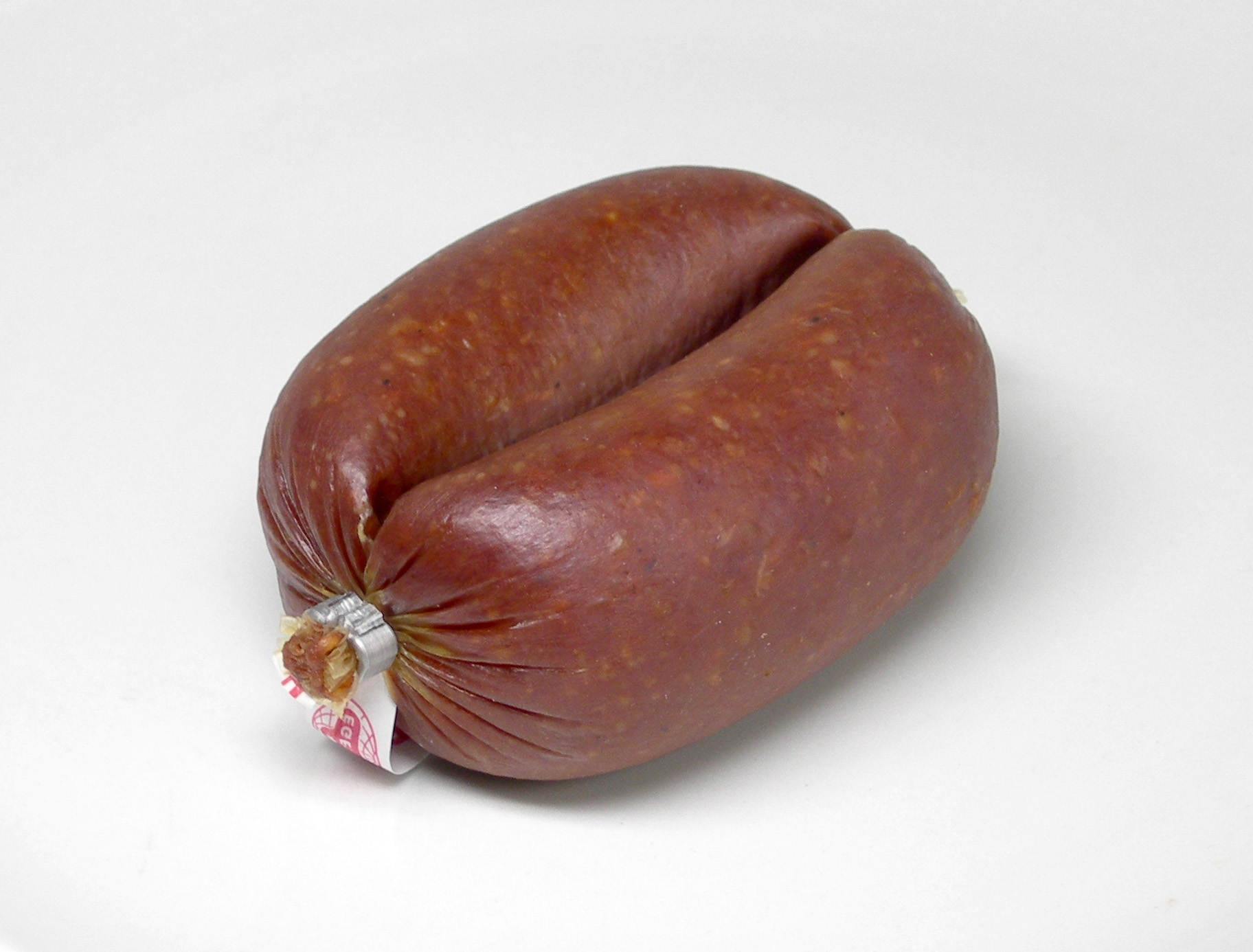
- Parmak sucuk
- Alternative names: Sucuk, suxhuk, sudjuk, sudžuk, sudžuka, sudzhuk, sugiuc, sodjouk, soudjuk
- Type: Sausage
- Region or state: Central Asia
- Main ingredients: Ground meat (usually beef, lamb), cumin, garlic, salt, red pepper

Sujuk, sugou or sucuk (/suːˈd͡ʒʊk/) is a Turkish dry, spicy and fermented sausage which is consumed in several Anatolian, Balkan, Middle Eastern and Central Asian cuisines. Sujuk mainly consists of ground meat and animal fat usually obtained from beef or lamb, but beef is mainly used in Turkey, Egypt, Sudan, Armenia, Azerbaijan, Bosnia and Herzegovina, Albania, Georgia, Bulgaria, Kazakhstan, and Kyrgyzstan.

== Etymology ==
The Turkish word sucuk is derived from Old Turkic suğut or sugut, a term attested in medieval Turkic sources. Later forms, such as Persian zijak, represent borrowings rather than the source of the Turkish term.

Sucuk was first mentioned in the 11th century by Mahmud al-Kashgari in his Dīwān Lughāt al-Turk as suɣut (as a sausage made by stuffing spiced rice and meat into intestine casing). Another mention was made by Abu Hayyan al-Gharnati in his early 14th century work titled Kitab al-'idrak li-lisan al-'atrak (كتاب الإدراك للسان الأتراك). The word "suɣut" itself means "sujuk, or dried thing" and derived from Turkic root -suɣur meaning to dry or to drain off and the suffix "-çïk/-çuk" is Turkic diminutive suffix (Suɣutçuk => Sucuk). Cognate names are also present in other Turkic languages, e.g. Kazakh: шұжық, shujyq; Kyrgyz: чучук, chuchuk. Franciscus a Mesgnien Meninski in his Thesaurus recorded the word sucuk (سجوق) in Ottoman Turkish in late 17th century.

The Turkish name has been adopted largely unmodified by other languages in the region, including: Gagauz: sucuk; Albanian: suxhuk; Arabic: سُجُق, romanized: sujuq; Armenian: սուջուխ, romanized: suǰux; Bosnian: sudžuk or sudžuka; Bulgarian: суджук, romanized: sudzhuk; Greek: σουτζούκι, romanized: sutzúki; Macedonian: суџук, romanized: sudzhuk; Azerbaijani: sucuq; Romanian: sugiuc or ghiuden; Russian: суджук, romanized: sudzhuk; Serbo-Croatian: sudžuk / cyџyк; Kurdish: benî, sicûq.

== Origin ==
Sujuk is associated with Turkic meat-preservation traditions. It is now produced and consumed in Turkey, the Balkans, the Middle East, Central Asia, and the Caucasus under a variety of related names.

== Production ==
In Turkey, beef is the main raw material for sucuk production. At the beginning of the process the meat is preground in 14–16-millimetre (0.55–0.63 in) plates and tested for its fat content. Afterwards the meat is mixed with curing salt, which contains 0.5% sodium nitrite, and stored for 8–16 hours in 8–12 °C (46–54 °F) for further processing. Later the preground meat is mixed with frozen and ground tail fat, beef tallow, suet and additives like spices, ascorbate, dextrose and starter culture. The mixture is ground again in 1.6–5-millimetre (0.063–0.197 in) plates, which forms the mosaic structure of sucuk. Thenceforth the product is filled in casings made of collagen or fiber and these casings are twisted or tied to portion sucuk.

Sucuk is then prepared for ripening process, which consists of fermentation and post-fermentation stages. In the first day of fermentation stage the product is left in a high relative humidity (RH) environment around 22–23 °C (72–73 °F). After that the RH and the temperature is gradually dropped each day, resulting to 18 °C (64 °F) and 88% RH in the last and third day of fermentation. At the end of the stage pH of the product must be dropped to 4.9–5.0. In the post-fermentation stage sucuk is matured and dried until the moisture content of the sausage is under 40%.

Regional varieties of sujuk

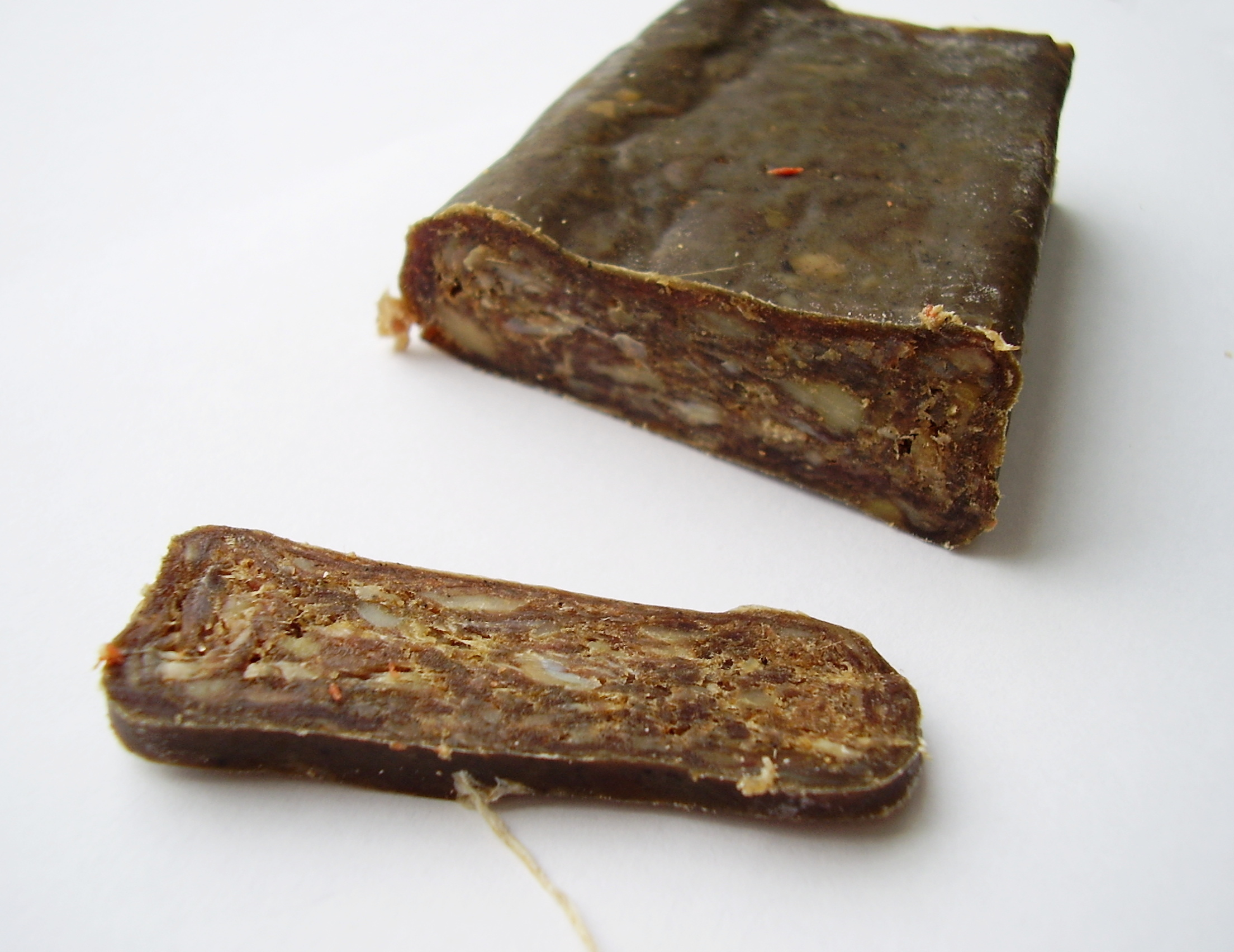
Suǰux from Armenia

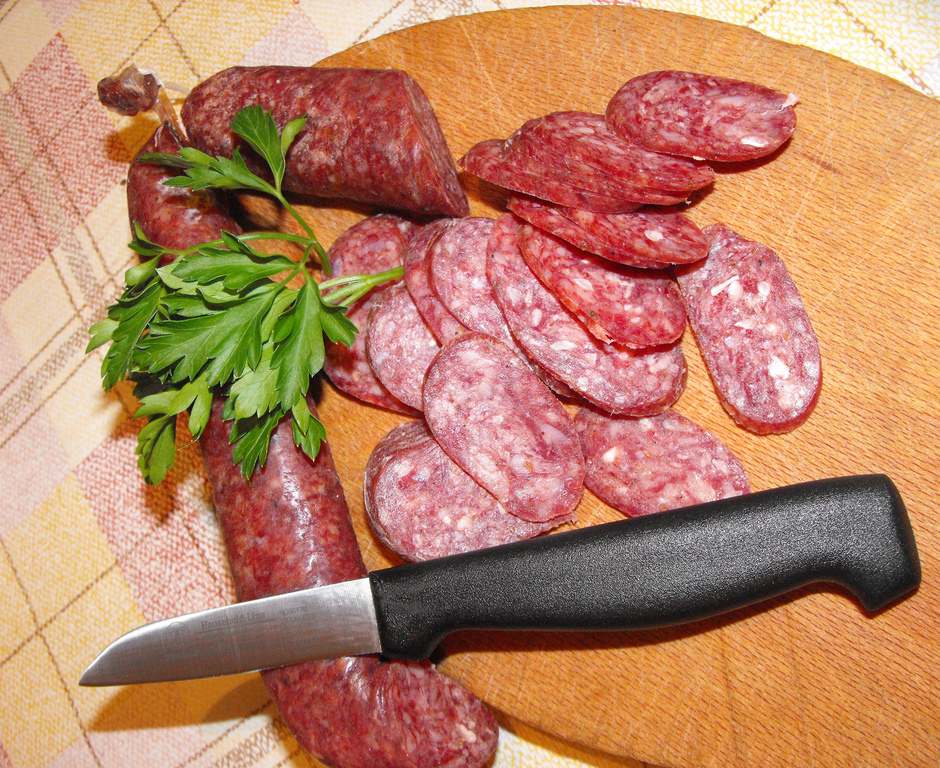
Sudzhuk from Bulgaria

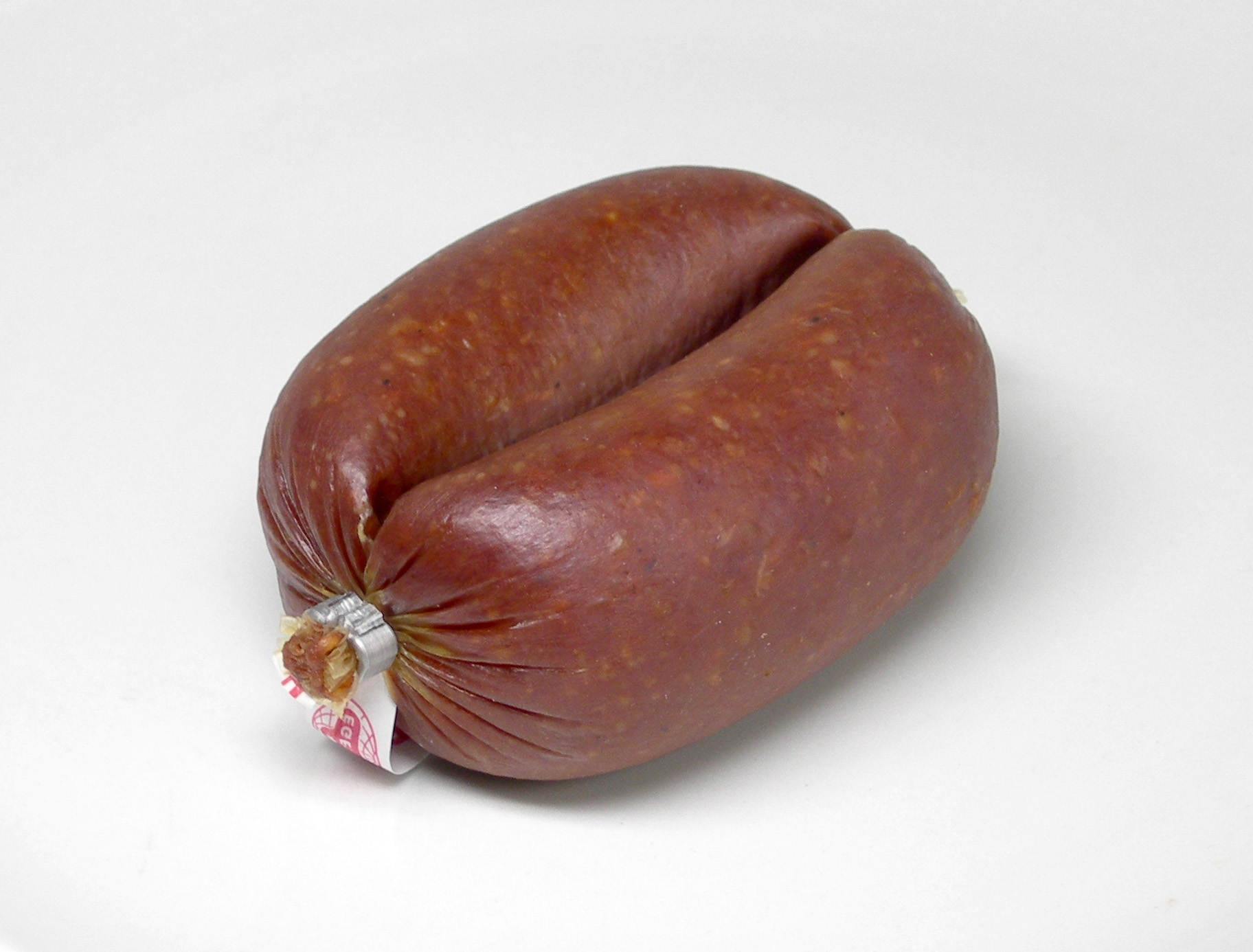
Sucuk from Turkey

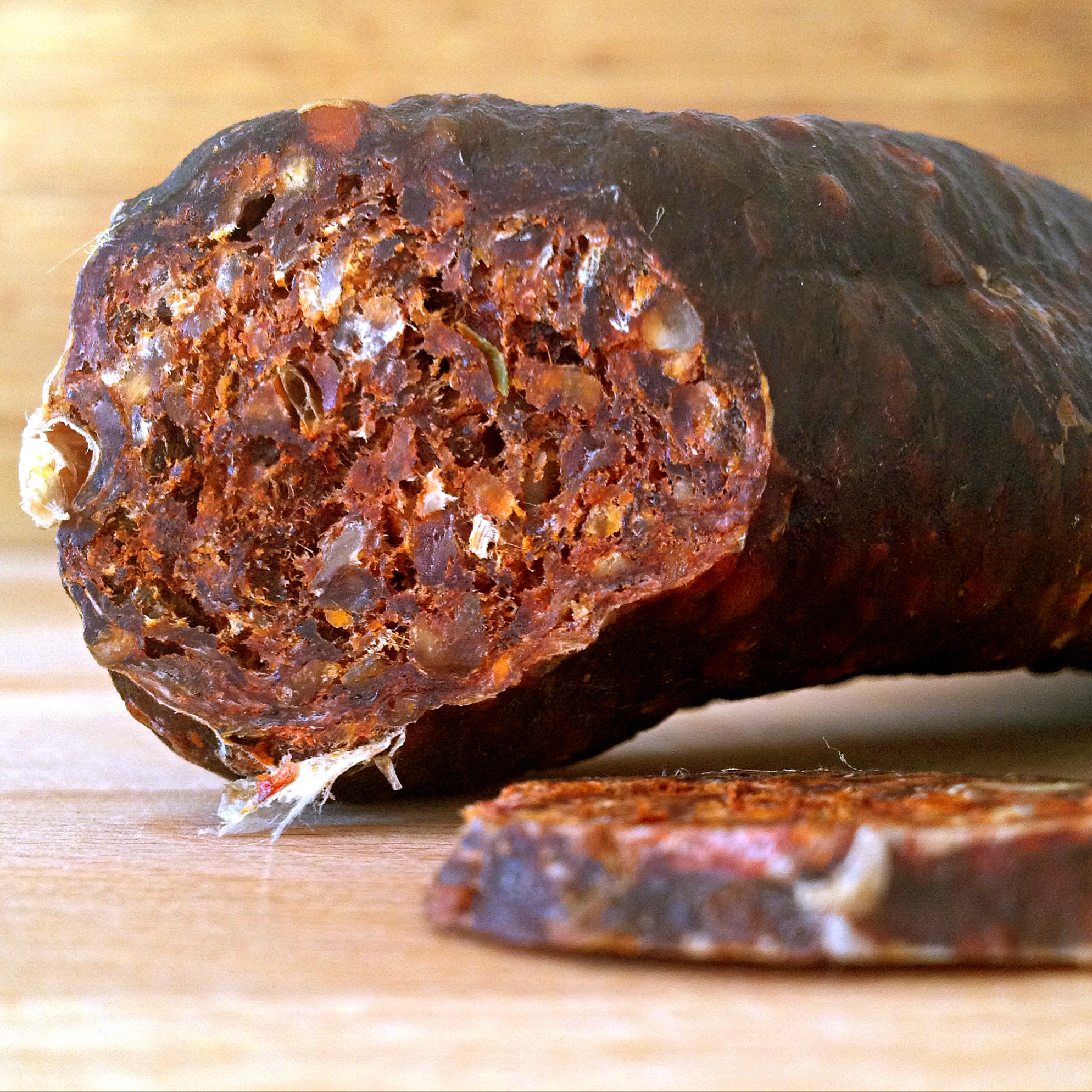
Home-made suxhuk from Kosovo

== Nutrition ==
It was reported that sucuk from Turkey on average contained 24.5% protein, 31.5% fat, 35.65% moisture and 3.80% salt. Fat content of sucuk is highly variable; some sucuk brands tested contained only 23% fat, meanwhile others exceeded 42%.

== Dishes prepared with sujuk ==
While sujuk can be eaten raw, it is typically cooked before consumption. Thin slices of sujuk can be pan-fried in a bit of butter, while larger pieces may be grilled. Sucuklu yumurta, which literally means "eggs with sujuk", is commonly served as a Turkish breakfast dish. Sucuklu yumurta is a simple dish of fried eggs cooked together with sujuk, but sujuk may also be added to other egg dishes like menemen (which is similar to shakshouka but with scrambled eggs instead of poached).

Sujuk can be added to many dishes including bean stew (kuru fasulye), filled phyllo dough pastries (burek) and as a topping for pizza or pide.

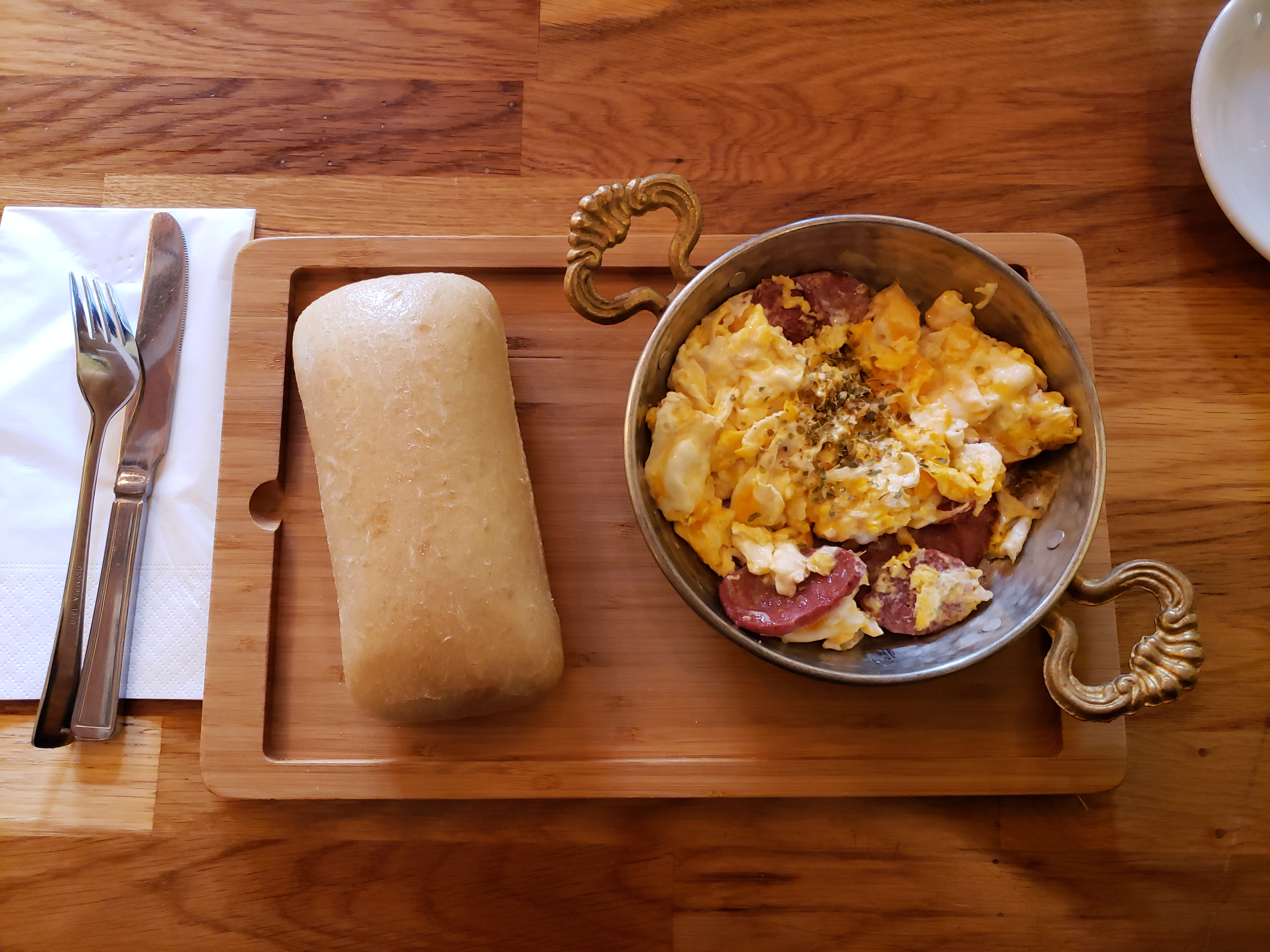
Eggs with sujuk

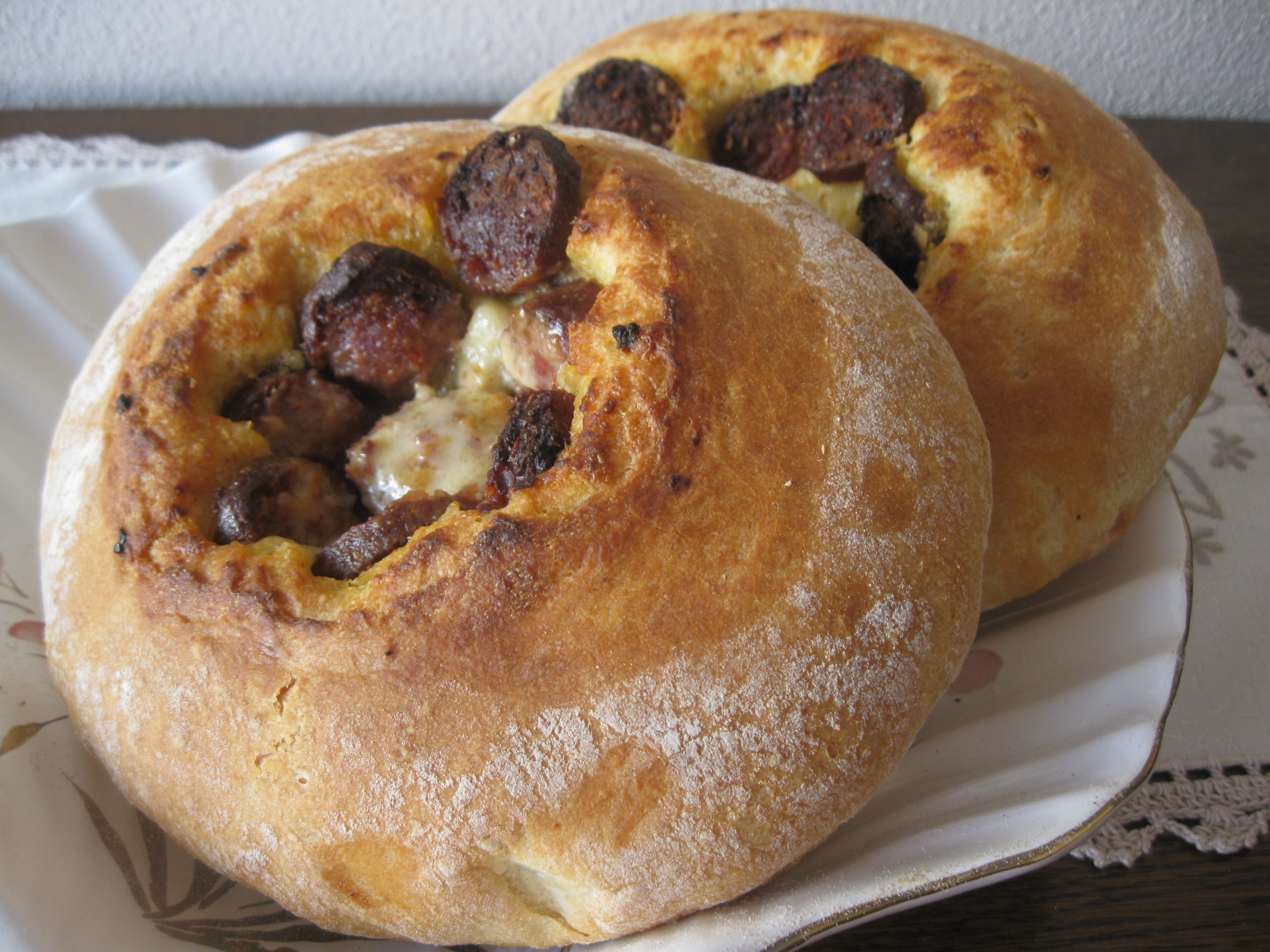
Bread with sujuk

== Geographical indication ==
In 2025, Armenia applied for geographical indication (GI) registration for Armenian sujukh.

== See also ==
- Bresaola
- Lukanka
- Makhan, a horsemeat sausage
- Qazı
- Salami
- Soutzoukakia, spicy meatballs in sauce whose name means literally "little sucuk"
